= Coaches of the Great Western Railway =

British rolling stock, 1838–1947

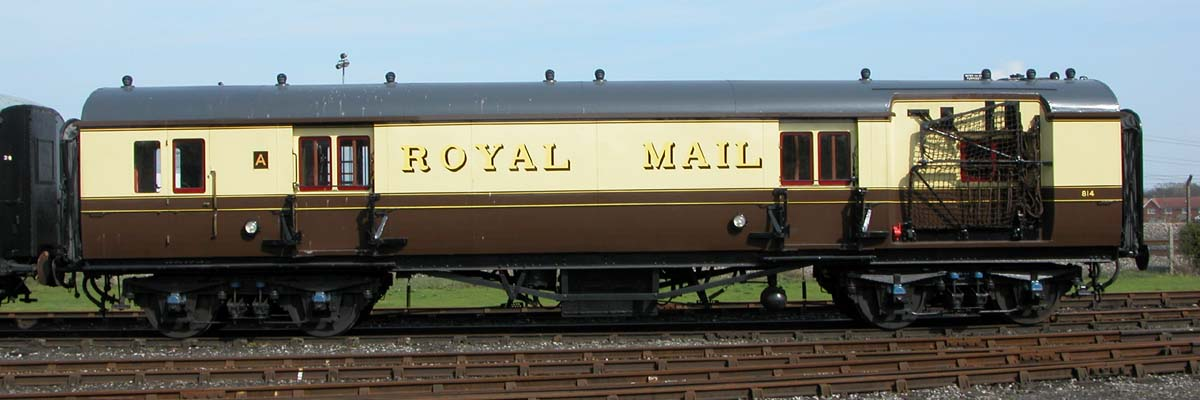
A Travelling Post Office coach

The passenger coaches of the Great Western Railway (GWR) were many and varied, ranging from four and six-wheeled vehicles for the original broad gauge line of 1838, through to bogie coaches up to 70 feet (21 m) long which were in service through to 1947. Vacuum brakes, bogies and through-corridors all came into use during the nineteenth century, and in 1900 the first electrically lit coaches were put into service. The 1920s saw some vehicles fitted with automatic couplings and steel bodies.

Early vehicles were built by a number of independent companies, but in 1844 the railway started to build carriages at Swindon Works, which eventually provided most of the railway's stock. Special vehicles included sleeping cars, restaurant cars and slip coaches. Passengers were also carried in railmotors, autotrains, and diesel railcars. Passenger-rated vans carried parcels, horses, and milk and at express speeds.

Most coaches were painted in a chocolate brown and cream livery, although this did change over the years, however they were plain brown or red until 1864 and from 1908 to 1922. Parcels vans and similar vehicles were seldom painted in the two-colour livery, being plain brown or red instead, which caused them to be known as "brown vehicles".

== History ==
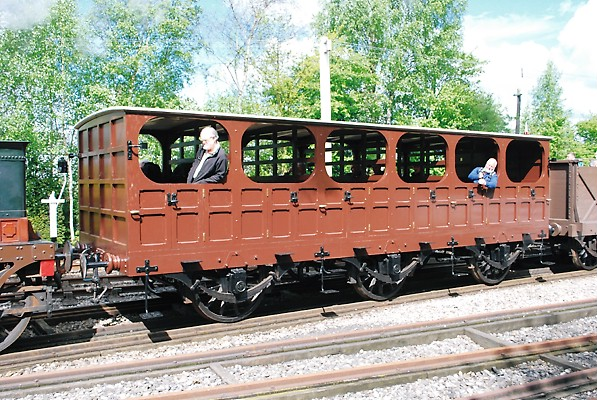
Replica of a GWR Gooch Second Class broad gauge coach

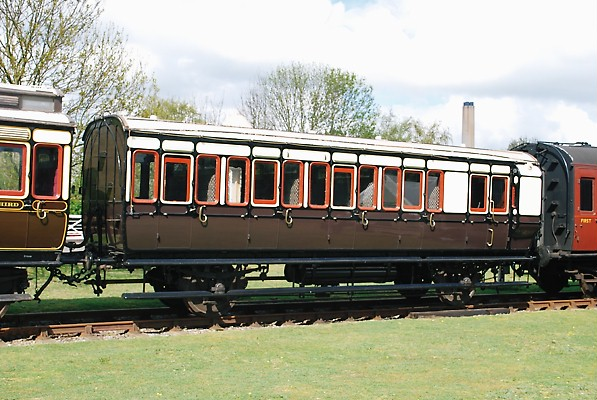
GWR Dean 31 Brake Third No.416 of 1891, as preserved at the Didcot Railway Centre

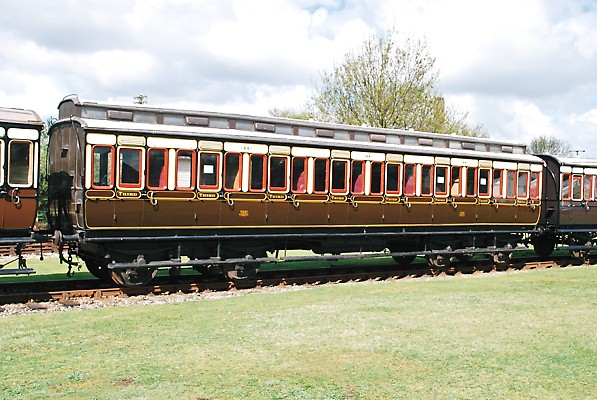
GWR Dean Third No.1941 of 1901 with clerestory roof, as preserved at the Didcot Railway Centre

=== Pre 1900s ===
Early GWR carriages, in common with other railways at the time, were typically wooden vehicles based on stagecoach practice and built on short, rigid six-wheel (or sometimes four-wheel) underframes, although the 7 ft (2,134 mm) broad gauge allowed wider bodies with more people seated in each compartment. Three classes were provided, although third class carriages were not conveyed in every train and, for the first few years, were little more than open trucks with rudimentary seats. Some rigid eight-wheeled carriages were produced but vacuum brakes and bogies made an appearance before the end of the broad gauge in 1892.

The first train in the United Kingdom with corridor connections between all carriages entered service on 7 March 1892 on the Paddington to Birkenhead route, and further corridor trains were introduced on all the main routes over the next few years. In 1900, a new Milford Boat Train set introduced electric lights and the communication cord was moved inside the train; until now a passenger needing to stop the train in an emergency had to lean out of the window and pull a cord above the door. At this time carriages generally had a clerestory roof but elliptical roofs were fitted to the GWR steam rail motors in 1903.

=== 1903–1930 ===
The GWR always had an in-built loading gauge advantage over the other British railways, in that some of its infrastructure was originally designed for (7 ft ¼ in) broad gauge dimensions. After switching to 1,435 mm (4 ft 8 1/2 in), the GWR had extra space in which it could design and deploy larger-scale rolling stock on former broad gauge lines such as from London to Plymouth and Penzance.

The first carriage stock to take advantage of both advantages were the 1904 Dreadnought stock, with:

- Length of 70 feet (21 m), when standard loading gauge carriages that were able to traverse the entire railway in Great Britain were a maximum of 57 feet (17 m)
- Width of 9 feet 6 inches (2.90 m), when standard loading gauge was a maximum of 9 feet (2.7 m). To keep within GWR loading gauge restrictions, the end doors were inset to the vestibules

The "Dreadnought" was also the first GWR carriage with internal compartment doors, but as these did not go down well with the travelling public, the next design reverted to external compartment doors. The Concertina design of 1906/7 reverted to 9 feet (2.7 m) width but retained the 70 feet (21 m) length. The doors were recessed into the body side rather than flush with the outer panels, and as each carriage was placed in a fixed-set, the company had fitted bellows-like material connections between carriages to smooth the airflow.

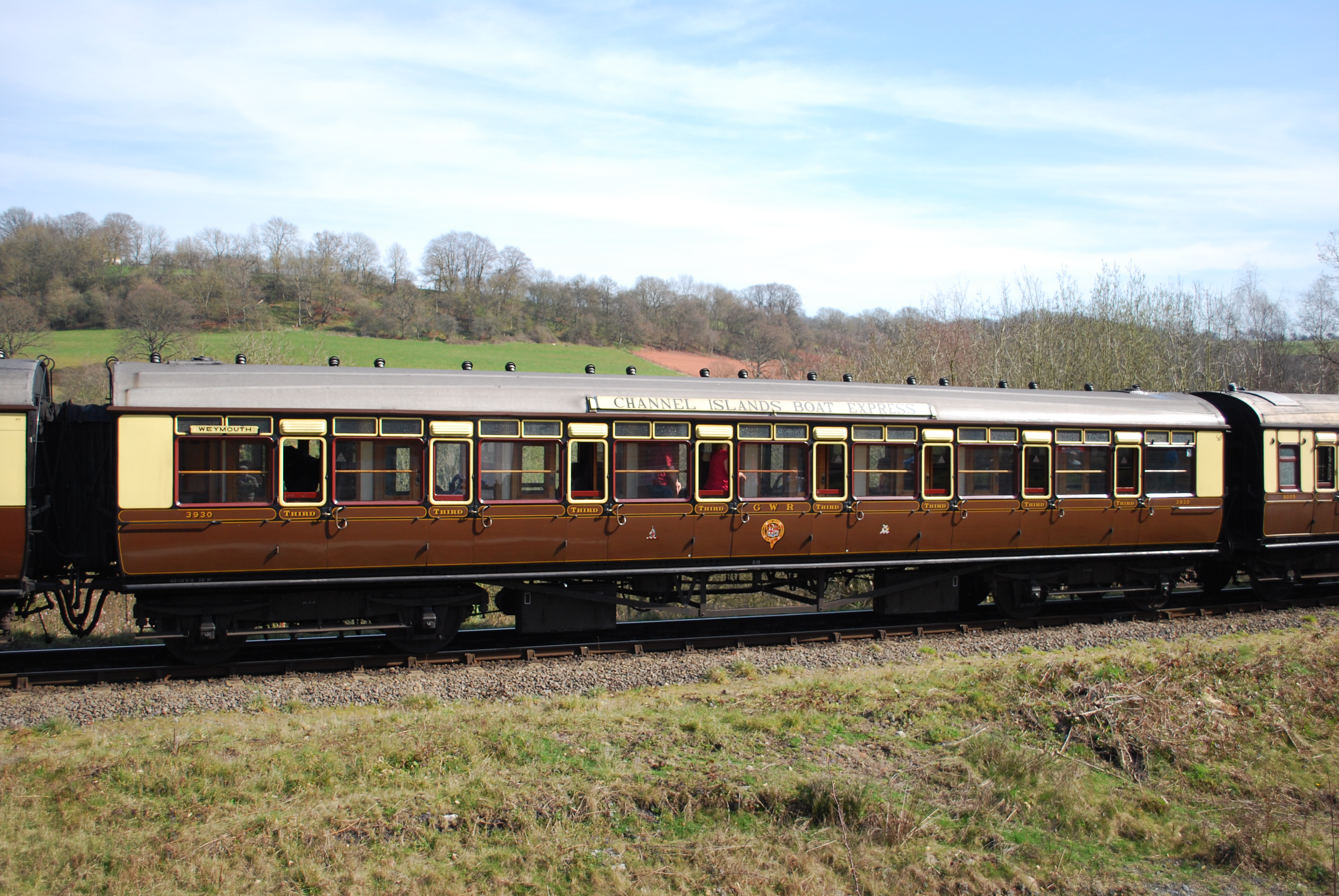
GWR Churchward 57 "Toplight" Corridor Third No.3930, as preserved at the Severn Valley Railway

The GWR most successful and iconic design was the Toplight stock of 1907, which gained its name through the small "lights" or windows above the main windows. The "Toplight" reverted to a standard loading gauge pattern with lengths of up to 57 feet (17 m) but always 9 feet (2.7 m) wide. Coaches panelled in steel rather than wood first appeared in 1912.

The next significant change came in 1922 when bow-ended stock was introduced in both 57 ft and 70 ft lengths. Hitherto coaches had featured flat ends but bow ends were easier to fit with Buckeye couplings that were then finding favour with passenger trains in the United Kingdom. These coaches were generally more plain than earlier vehicles as they had flush sides without beaded panels.

Unlike other railways which were highly dependent on commuters, the GWR had not introduced any high-capacity articulated sets until 1925, which due to their lack of flexibility in use were seen by Swindon as a failure. From 1929 coaches had windows flush with the body panels, the first such sets being for the Cornish Riviera Express but general service coaches followed the following year, including the "B Sets", two-coach trains mainly used on branch lines.

=== 1930s ===
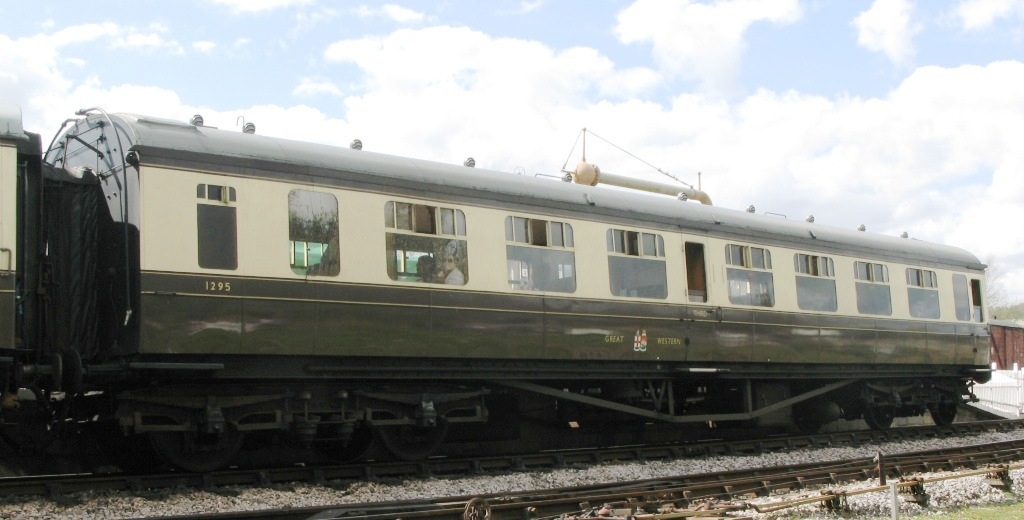
A third class open coach built for excursion trains in 1937

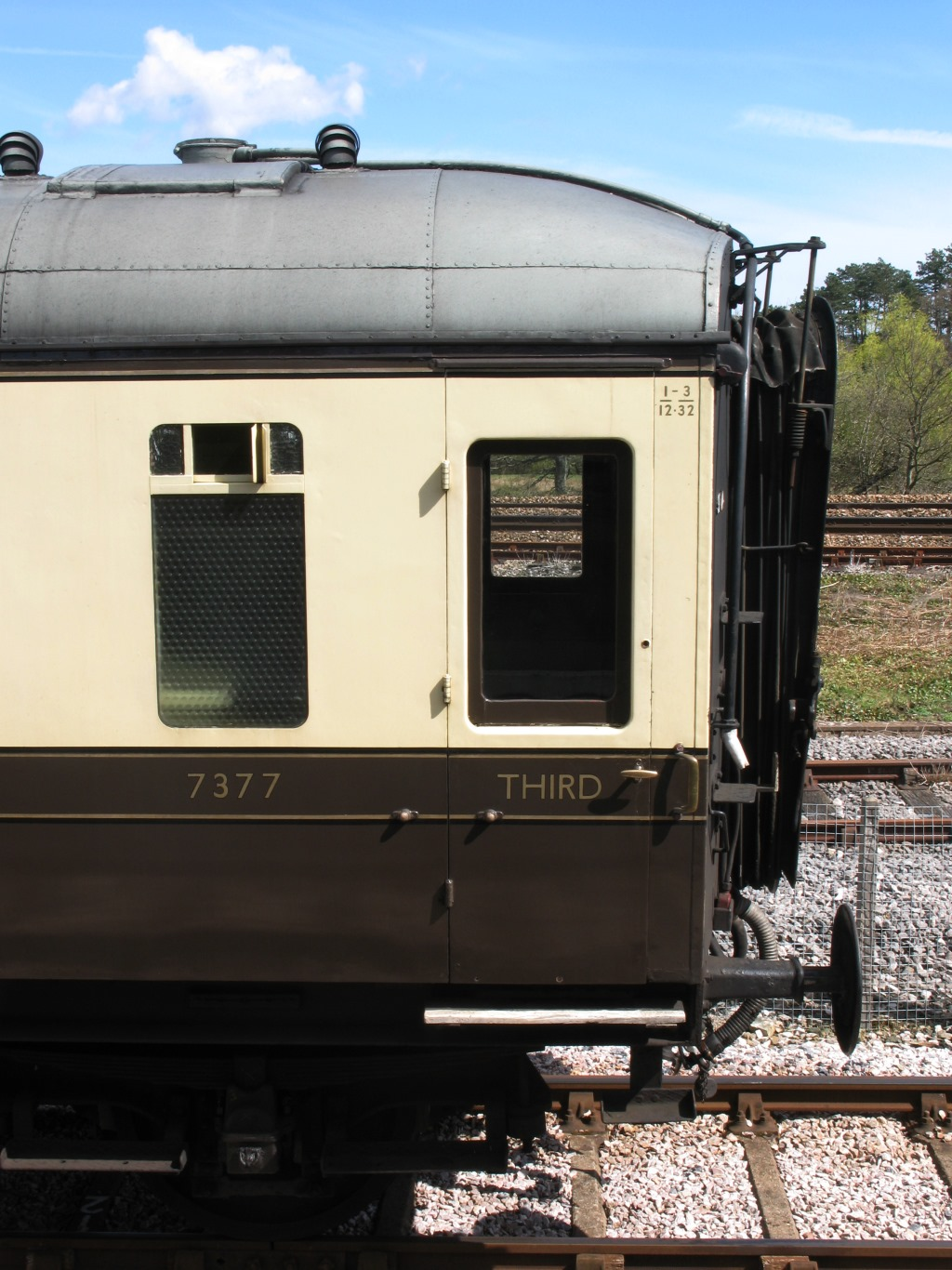
The distinctive roof profile of a Hawksworth-designed coach

With costs rising and revenues falling, General Manager Sir Felix Pole had told Chief Mechanical Engineer Charles Collett to develop more powerful economic designs, which lead to his adaption of his predecessor George Jackson Churchward's design, as opposed to the taking on board of new steam technology such as Sir William Stanier did at the London, Midland and Scottish Railway. Collett followed the same philosophy in his carriage design, improving or adapting as opposed to innovating.

In 1929, the GWR board approved the lease from Pullman Company of new Pullman Carriages for the "Ocean" special boat trains serving the passenger liners berthing at Plymouth. However, in 1929 the GWR Board approved Collett's proposed development of a larger and more accommodating carriage, as had been tried with the earlier "Dreadnoughts". In 1931 the first of the eight "Super Saloons" were built, also known as "Ocean Saloons".

In 1935, excursion stock with open saloons instead of compartments was introduced, followed by the 26 "Super-Saloon"-scale Centenary stock for the Cornish Riviera Express. From 1936 onwards, all new GWR main line stock had large windows to each compartment and entry-exit via the corridor and end vestibules, but it had taken Collett six years to do what the LMS and LNER had been doing since 1930.

A distinctive new profile appeared in 1944, when new CME Frederick Hawksworth introduced corridor coaches with domed roof-ends, although non-corridor coaches and auto trailers retained a more conventional roof. Fluorescent lights were tried in new coaches built in 1946.

== Special carriages ==
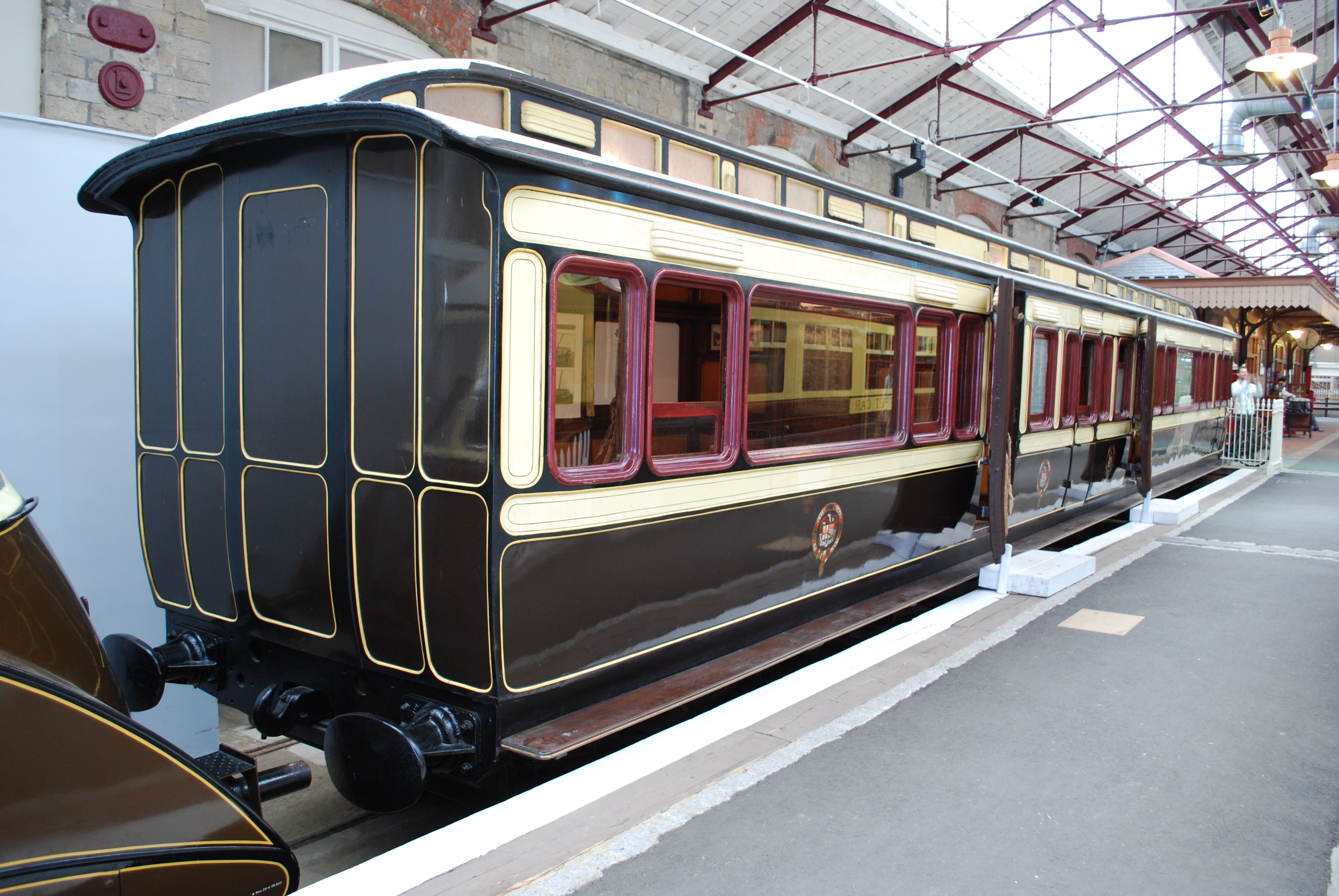
GWR Royal Saloon No.233, designed by Dean in 1897 for Queen Victoria's Diamond Jubilee

A few sleeping cars were operated on the broad gauge and such carriages became familiar on overnight trains. Restaurant cars became practical following the introduction of corridor trains; the first cars in 1896 were for first class passengers only but a second class buffet car appeared on the Milford Boat Train in 1900. Slip coaches were operated on many routes that could be uncoupled from the rear of a moving train and serve intermediate stations that the train did not call at. During World War II some "Special Saloons" were built for the use of VIPs and for the Royal Train.

== Livery ==
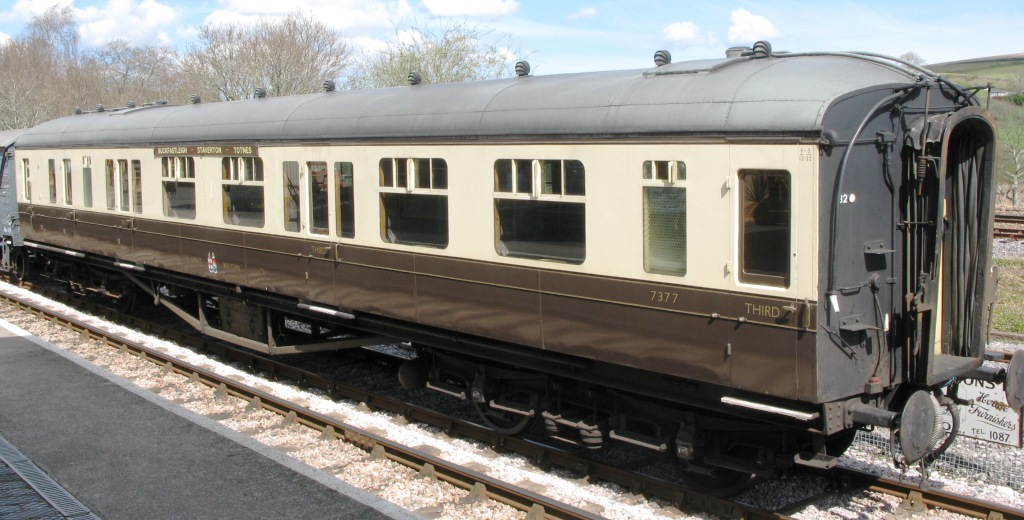
Hawksworth brake composite preserved on the South Devon Railway shows the familiar "chocolate and cream" livery used for coaching stock from 1922

The livery of early carriages was a dark chocolate brown but from 1864 the upper panels were painted white which became a pale cream after being varnished and exposed to the weather. These panels were later painted in cream to give a similar effect. From 1908 carriages were painted chocolate brown all over but this changed to a red lake colour in 1912. A two-colour livery reappeared in 1922, now with a richer shade of cream on the upper panels and chocolate brown below. Certain vehicles such as parcels vans and horse boxes, which were allowed to run in passenger trains, were often painted in just chocolate brown when the passenger carrying coaches were in chocolate and cream, and so this non-passenger carrying coaching stock came to be known as "brown vehicles".

== Numbering ==
Each class of carriage was initially numbered in its own series, starting at 1. This entailed renumbering any vehicles that were reclassified, for instance first class carriages downgraded to second class. To bring them all into one series in 1907 third class carriages were left with their original numbers; second class had 5000 added to their numbers; composites had 6000 added; first class had 8000 added; sleepers and saloons were renumbered in the 9000–9399 series; and catering cars were renumbered in the 9500 series.

== Diagram codes ==
Diagram codes were introduced by George Jackson Churchward for easy reference to different carriage types. Each type could then be identified with a diagram that combined a letter (which represented a general type) and a number (which represented a distinctive design of that type ), for instance C3 or H16.

- A – Bogie first class
- B – Bogie second class
- C – Bogie third class
- D – Bogie brake third
- E – Bogie composite
- F – Slip
- G – Saloon
- H – Catering vehicle
- J – Sleeping car
- K – Brake van
- L – Mail van
- M – Bogie parcels van, etc.
- N – Horse box
- O – Milk van
- P – Carriage truck
- Q – Inspection saloon
- R – First class
- S – Third class (ex-second)
- T – Brake third (ex second)
- U – Composite
- V – Brake van
- W – Parcels van

== Telegraphic codes ==
The GWR pioneered telegraphic communication in 1839, and a number of code words came to be used to represent various carriage types. The codes changed over the years as needs changed. Many of the codes could have an extra letter to identify variations, such as Scorpion C (a 45 ft (14 m) carriage truck), or Scorpion D (a 21 ft (6.4 m) carriage truck). In 1939 the following codes were in use:

- Beetle – special cattle truck
- Bloater – covered fish truck
- Catox – cattle box
- Chafer – invalid carriage
- Chintz – family carriage
- Chub – third saloon
- Cricket – composite carriage
- Emmett – brake third carriage
- First – first class carriage
- Gnat – slip coach
- Hydra – well truck for road vehicles
- Melon – brake third carriage
- Mex – cattle wagon
- Monster – scenery truck
- Paco – horse box
- Python – covered carriage truck
- Scorpion – carriage truck
- Siphon – milk van
- Snake – passenger brake van
- Termite – third class carriage
