= The Cornishman =

The Cornishman may refer to:

- The Cornishman (newspaper), a weekly newspaper based in Penzance, Cornwall
- The Cornishman (train), a British express passenger train
- Cornishman
