= Withdrawn British Rail stock =

Decommissioned railway vehicles

Withdrawn British Rail stock is British railway coaches, wagons and locomotives that have been removed from service.

== Withdrawn locomotives ==
=== Steam locomotives ===
British Railways (BR) inherited more than 20,000 locomotives from the constituent Big Four companies, the vast majority of which were steam locomotives. BR built 2,537 steam locomotives in from 1948 to 1960: 1,538 were to pre-nationalisation designs, and 999 to its own standard designs. These locomotives were destined to lead short lives, some as little as five years against a design life of over 30 years, because of the end of steam traction on 11 August 1968. The exceptions were locomotives No. 98007-98009 which continued to work the Vale of Rheidol Railway for BR until it was sold in 1989. They remain in operation on the privately owned heritage railway.

=== Diesel locomotives ===
When BR was created, diesel traction was in its infancy in the United Kingdom (though more progress had been made in other countries, whose experience could arguably have been used to a greater degree in informing developments in the UK). Only two main-line diesel (LMS prototype) locomotives was inherited in 1948 (though more were on order) and a handful of diesel shunters of various types.

Initially, BR persisted with the small scale experimentation with diesel traction while continuing to build hundreds of steam locomotives to old and new designs. Even some steam shunters were being built through to the mid-1950s, when standard diesel shunters were already in large-scale production. It was not until the 1955 Modernisation Plan that more substantial developments in main-line diesel locomotive technology were planned.

The Plan envisaged small numbers of prototype locomotives of varying power types being ordered from a variety of manufacturers. These could be tested and compared against each other before large-scale orders were placed. However, even before many of the prototypes had been delivered, a combination of the political need to maintain employment in the British locomotive-building industry and over-optimistic assessments of the possibilities offered by new diesel locomotives meant that large-scale orders were placed for a wide variety of untested and incompatible designs, many of which proved to be very poor.

By the end of 1968, all steam locomotives had been withdrawn - but, from 1967 to 1971, so were a large number of virtually new diesel locomotives and shunters (some only three years old) as many designs had proved unsuccessful, non-standard, and unnecessary with changed requirements on the railways, e.g. widespread line closures and the decline of wagonload freight traffic. However, some of the diesel shunters withdrawn during this period found further use on industrial railway systems.

After the production of some 5,000 diesel locomotives from 1956 to 1968, the British locomotive-building industry virtually collapsed. BR needed very few new diesel locomotives from then on; only 285 heavy-duty Class 56, Class 58 and Class 60 freight locomotives, and 199 Class 43 power cars were purchased from then until privatisation began in 1994. No diesel locomotives have been built in Britain for the mainline system since 1991; the most recent new types have been imported from Canada and Spain.

=== Electric locomotives ===
Electric traction was more advanced than diesel traction at nationalisation, with a number of isolated electrified networks across the country using a variety of power supplies, though 1500 V dc overhead supply had been accepted as the national standard in the 1930s. Most of these networks used electric multiple units to provide the passenger service, with steam locomotives operating freight trains. Thus, BR inherited only 13 ex London & North Eastern Railway and three ex Southern Railway electric locomotives, plus two departmental electric shunters, also ex-Southern Railway.

In the early years of BR, a number of locomotives were built to operate on the newly refurbished and electrified Woodhead line using the 1500 V dc overhead system. However, by the time that the next major electrification project, the West Coast Main Line (WCML), was underway, the decision had been taken to adopt 25 kV ac overhead as the standard supply system.

BR decided to test a variety of new 25 kV ac types for the WCML electrification; 100 locomotives of five classes were built by different manufacturers. Having learned the lessons from these types, a further 100 examples, of standard Class 86, were ordered. This class was introduced in 1966, and some are still in service today. The earlier prototypes, mostly pretty successful, succumbed in the 1980s and early 1990s as non-standard following the arrival of new electric locomotives.

Although the purchase of new electric types was carried out in a more successful way than the comparable process for diesel locomotives, the 200-odd electric locomotive fleet used to operate the WCML from the mid-1960s was still far smaller than that originally envisaged; more than 500 were thought necessary when the initial plans were developed. It was fortunate that changes in the railway's operation had already occurred before mass orders were placed for electric traction.

However, BR had intended to move away from loco-hauled electric trains on the main line as early as the 1970s. The Advanced Passenger Train (APT) was an electric multiple unit design intended to reduce journey times on the WCML by running at speeds of up to 150 mph (240 km/h). The APT used a sophisticated tilting mechanism to allow the coaches to lean into curves, and featured a hydrokinetic braking system to allow the train to stop within the existing fixed block signalling system. The project was plagued with technical problems and a lack of political will to overcome them resulted in the project being cancelled in the mid-1980s. In the end, the APT enjoyed something of an "afterlife" in the 2000s when its tilting technology re-appeared on the Italian designed Class 390 Pendolinos introduced for the WCML modernisation, finally replacing most of the electric locomotive fleet.

== Coaches ==
BR inherited the rolling stock of the Big Four railway companies and also continued to build coaches to their designs. In 1951, BR began its own programme of coach construction using standard designs, and included significant improvements in comfort and safety over previous designs. The first BR design was the Mark 1, with the final design being the Mark 4.

- British Carriage and Wagon Numbering and Classification
- Coaches of the London, Midland and Scottish Railway
- Coaches of the Great Western Railway
- Coaches of the Southern Railway
- Coaches of the London and North Eastern Railway
- British Railways Mark 1
- British Rail Mark 2
- British Rail Mark 3
- British Rail Mark 4

== Freight wagons ==
- Mineral wagons
- Parcel vans and mail wagons
- Industrial and oil tankers
- Flat wagons and car-transporters
- Gravel hoppers
