= Cornish Riviera Express =

British express passenger train

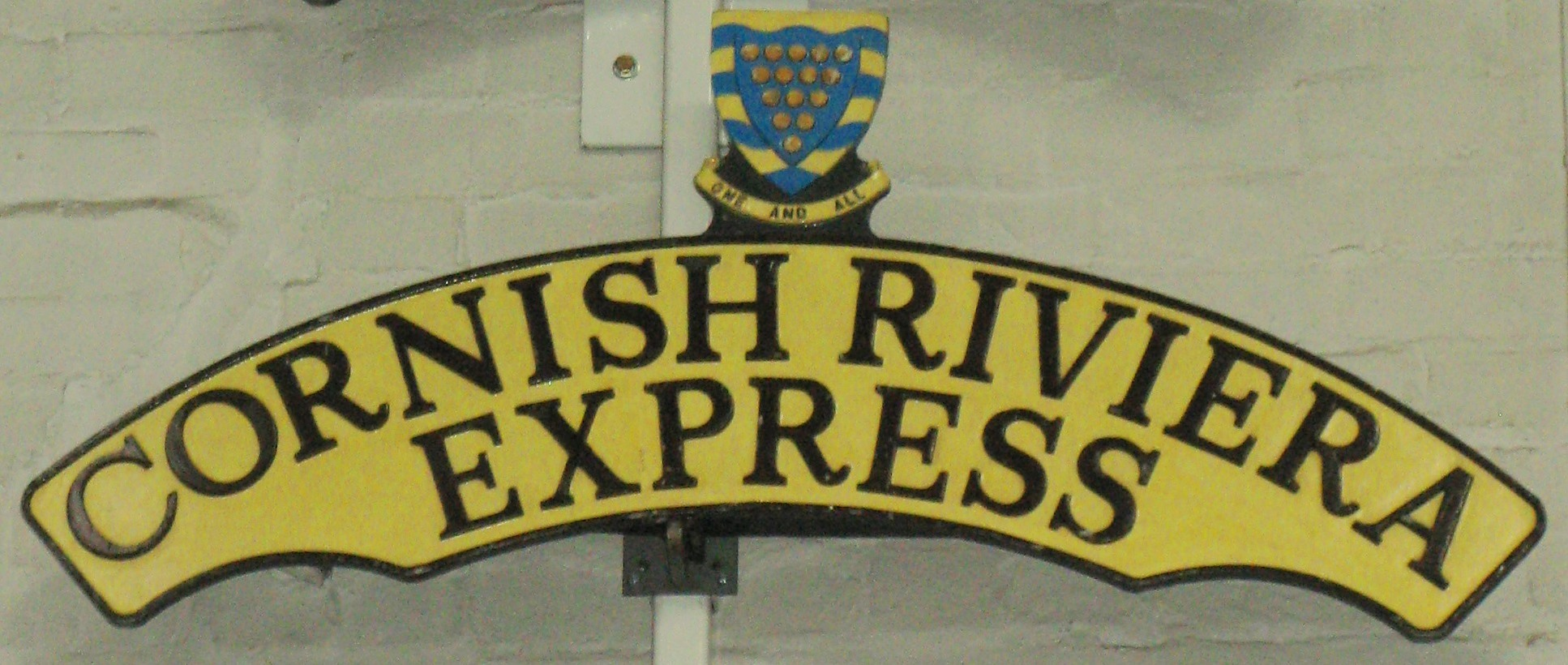

Overview
- Service type: Passenger train
- First service: 1 July 1904
- Current operator: Great Western Railway
- Former operators: InterCity Great Western; British Rail; Great Western Railway

Route
- Termini: London Paddington; Penzance
- Average journey time: 5 hours 30 minutes
- Service frequency: Daily
- Train numbers: 1C77 (westbound); 1A81 (eastbound)
- Lines used: Great Western; Reading to Taunton; Taunton to Exeter; Exeter to Plymouth; Cornish

Technical
- Rolling stock: Class 802/1
- Operating speed: 125 mph

The Cornish Riviera Express is a English express passenger train that has run between London Paddington and Penzance in Cornwall since 1904. Introduced by the Great Western Railway, the name Cornish Riviera Express has been applied to the late morning express train from London to Penzance continuously through nationalisation under British Rail and privatisation under First Great Western, only ceasing briefly during the two World Wars. The name is also applied to the late morning express train running in the opposite direction from Penzance to London. Through performance and publicity the Cornish Riviera Express has become one of the most famous named trains in the United Kingdom and is particularly renowned for the publicity employed by the Great Western Railway in the 1930s which elevated it to iconic status. Today it is operated by the Great Western Railway train operating company.

== History ==
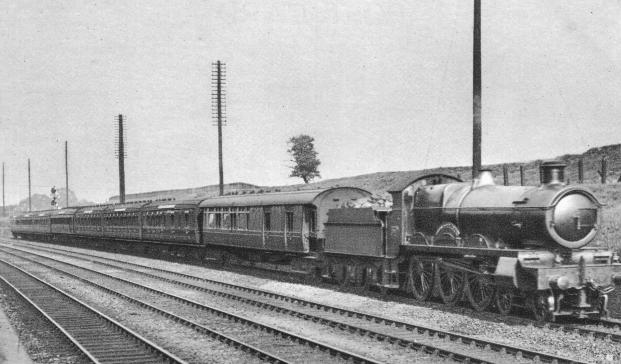
4038 Queen Berengaria near Acton with a London bound Cornish Riviera Express

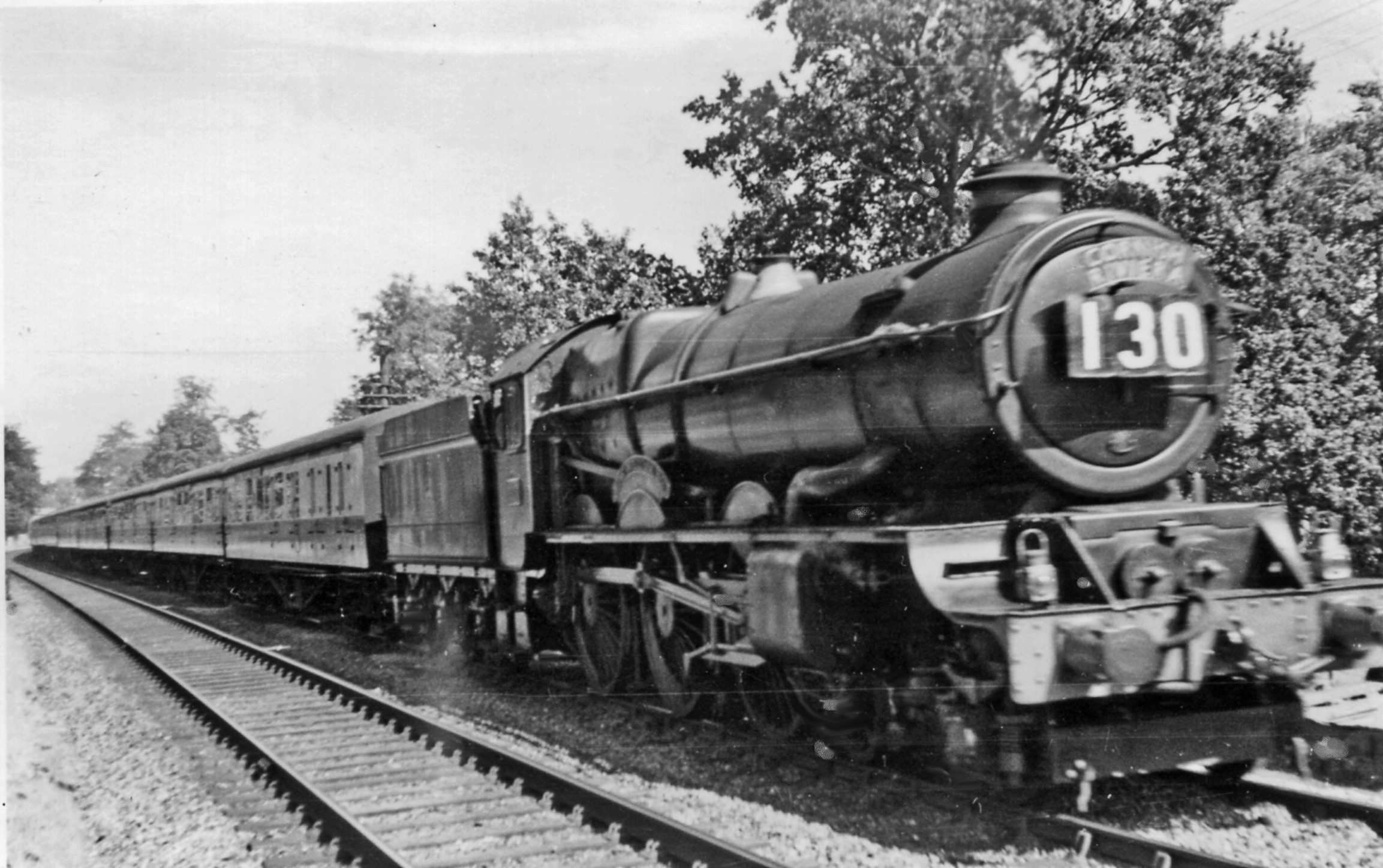
6007 King William III on Wellington Bank with a westbound Cornish Riviera in August 1954

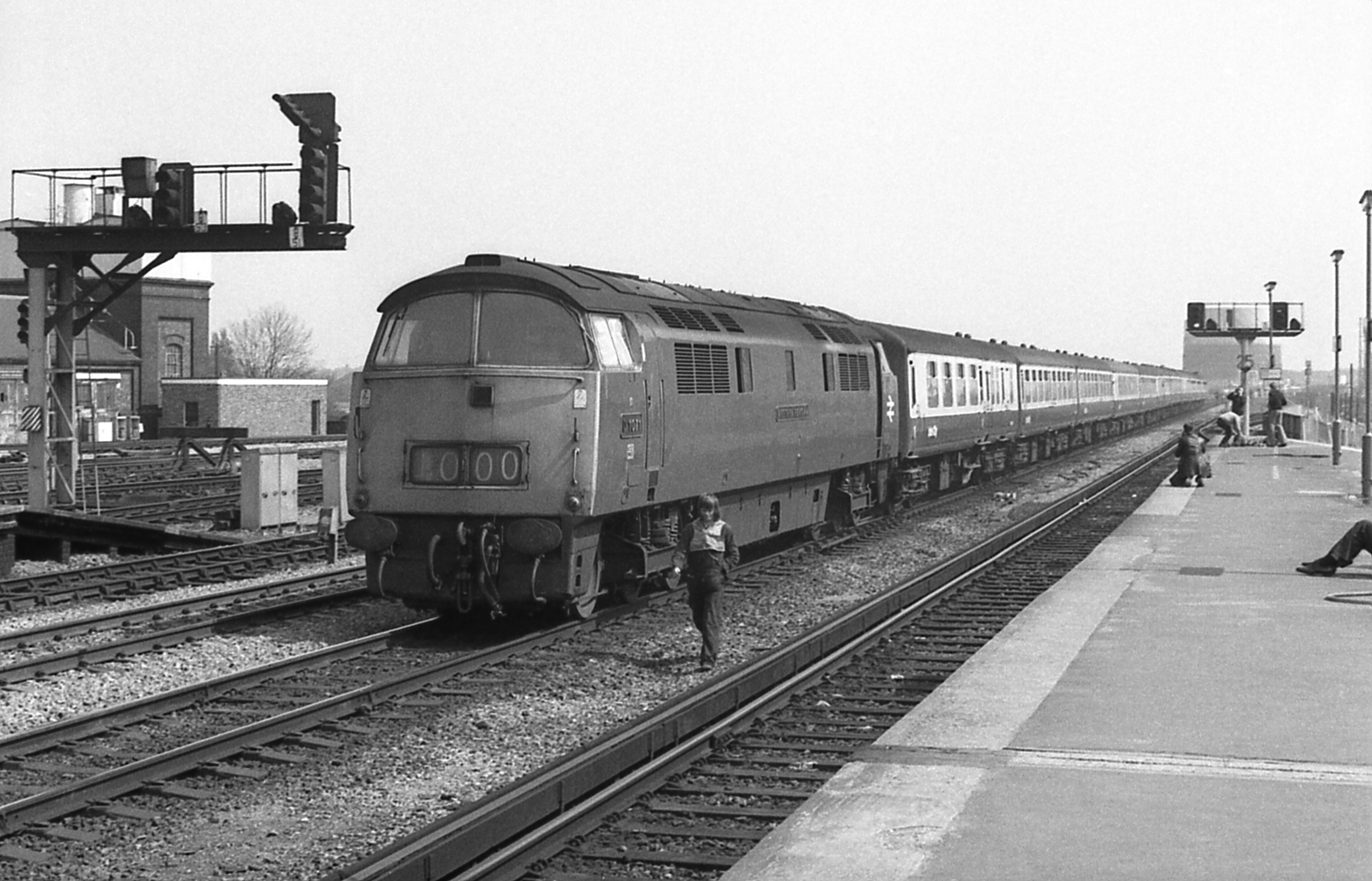
1071 Western Renown at Reading with a westbound Cornish Riviera in April 1976

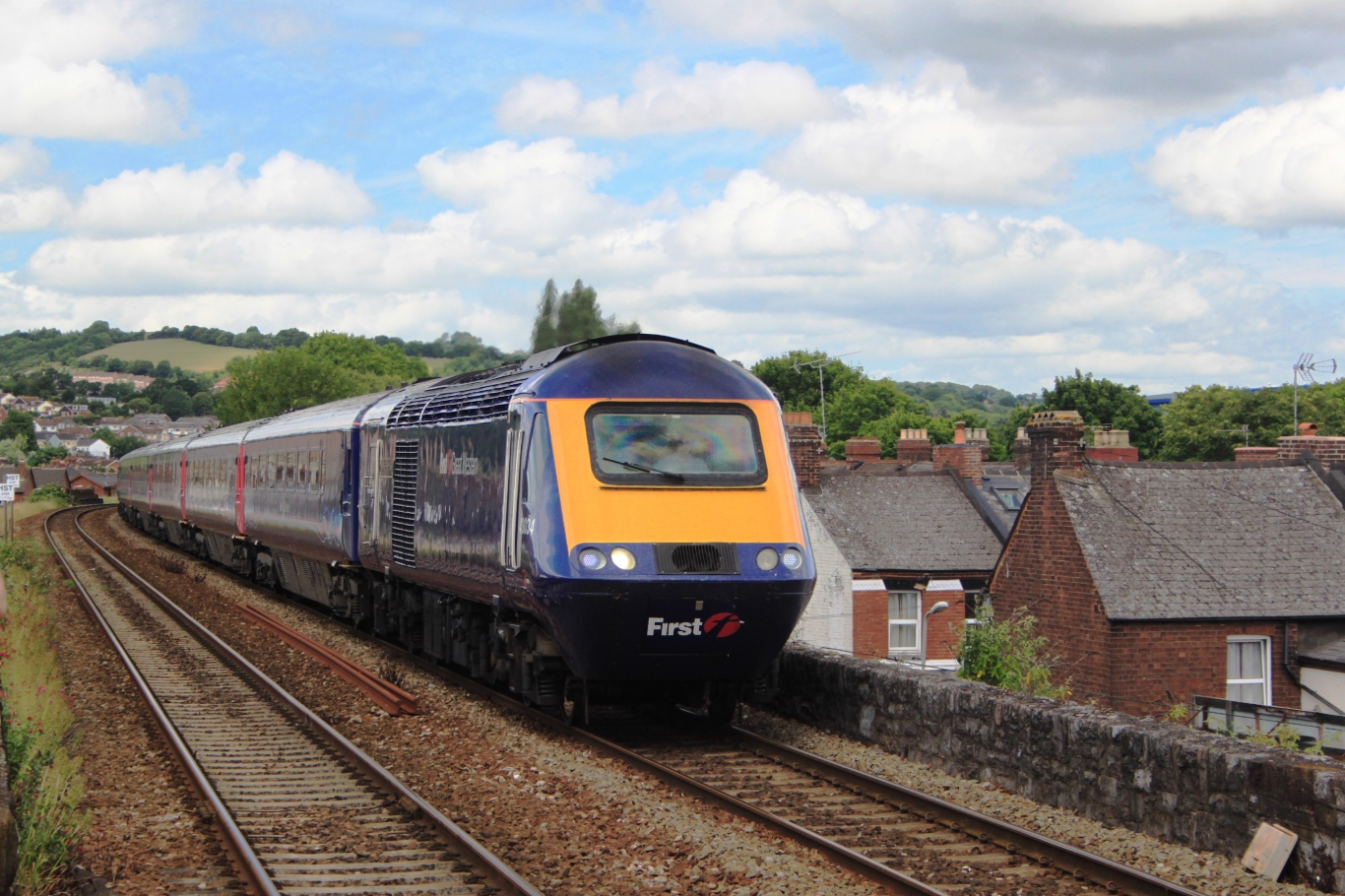
First Great Western High Speed Train with a westbound Cornish Riviera at Exeter St Thomas in July 2015

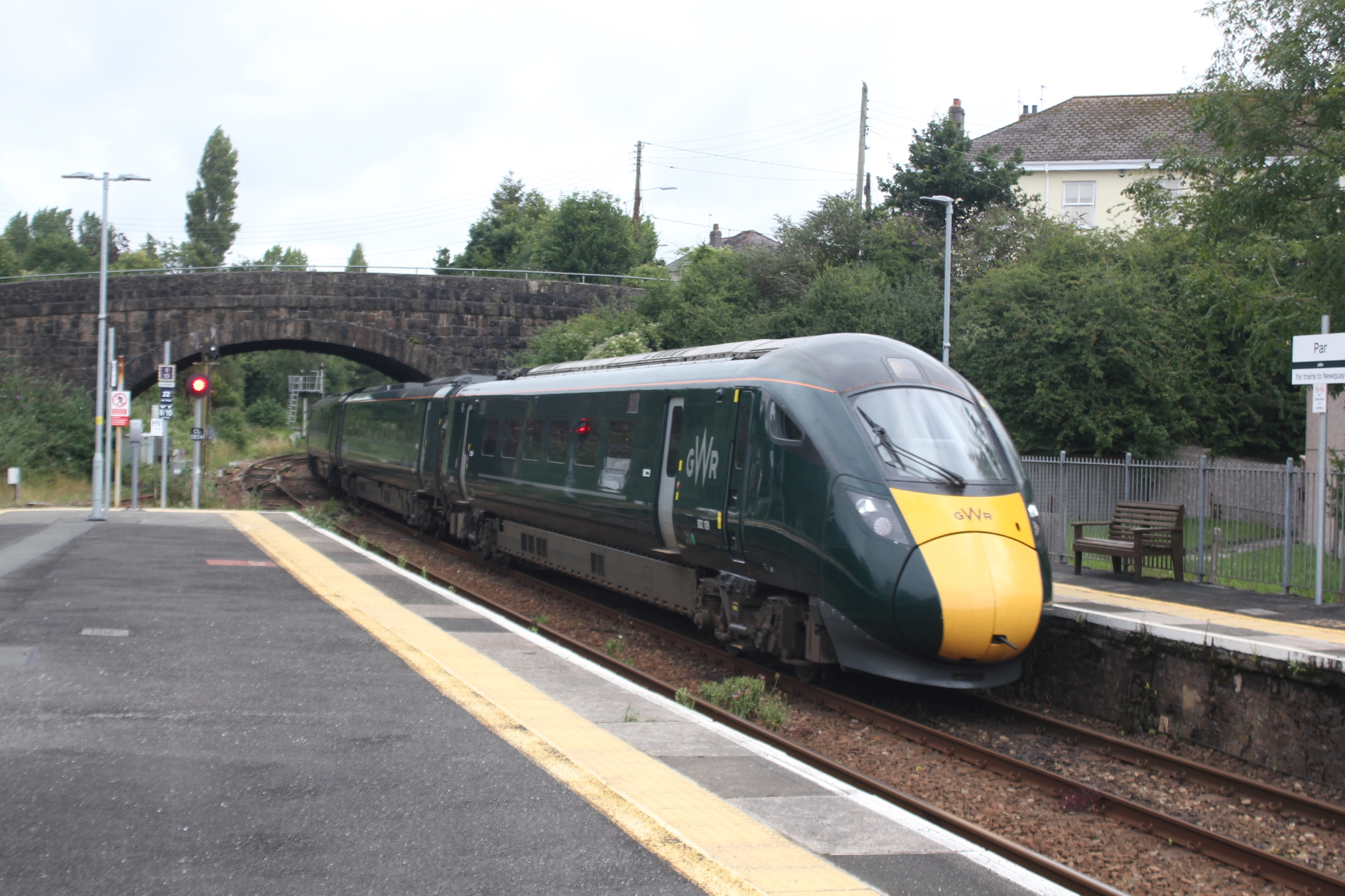
Great Western Railway Class 802 IET with a westbound Cornish Riviera at Par in August 2024

... there [is] surely no train ... to which the word romance could be more aptly applied than to the Limited

— O. S. Nock, The Limited

Through trains from London Paddington to Penzance began running on 1 March 1867 and included fast services such as the 10:15 Cornishman and 11:45 Flying Dutchman, but these still took nine hours or more for the journey. In the early years of the 20th century there was keen competition between the Great Western Railway (GWR) and the London and South Western Railway (LSWR) for the rail traffic between London and Plymouth. The LSWR route via Salisbury was 15 miles shorter than the GWR via Bristol, but to counter this the GWR started running non-stop to Exeter, and this provided the basis of a plan for a fast train to Plymouth and Penzance.

A new express service with limited stops was promoted by the GWR, commencing on 1 July 1904. It left London at 10:10 and was timed to reach Penzance at 17:10 running to Plymouth in 4 hours 25 minutes, a cut of 28 minutes on the previous fastest service. It conveyed six carriages to Penzance, including a dining car, and one more carriage for Falmouth that was detached at Truro then added to a branch train to complete its journey. Other stops were made at Plymouth North Road, Gwinear Road (for the Helston branch), and St Erth (for the St Ives branch). The return train from Penzance started at 10:00 and called additionally at Devonport.

A public competition was announced in the August 1904 edition of The Railway Magazine to choose the name, the prize being three guineas (£3.15). Among the 1,286 entries were two suggestions, The Cornish Riviera Limited and The Riviera Express, which were combined as The Cornish Riviera Express, although railwaymen tended to call it The Limited.

For the first two years, the new train ran only during the summer, but from the third year became a year-round feature of the timetable. With the opening of a 20 1/4 mile shorter route along the Langport and Castle Cary Railway in 1906, it was possible to start the train twenty minutes later from Paddington and still arrive in Penzance at the same time. New 68 ft (21 m) Concertina carriages were scheduled for the train at the same time. Additional slip coaches were added to be dropped from the train on the move at various stations to serve holiday destinations such as Weymouth, Minehead, Ilfracombe, and Newquay, and the train began to run non-stop to Newton Abbot where a pilot engine was added for the climb over the Dainton and Rattery banks, the southern outliers of Dartmoor. By the middle of World War I the train had grown to 14 coaches, even running in two portions on summer Saturdays, but the train was suspended in January 1917 as a wartime economy measure.

Running of The Limited resumed in summer 1919 although a 60 mph blanket speed limit was still in force, and it was not until autumn 1921 that pre-war timings were reinstated. In 1923 new steel-panelled coaches and, more importantly the introduction of the Castle Class locomotives, billed as the "most powerful locomotive in Britain". This allowed the train to travel to Plymouth without the need to stop to attach a pilot locomotive, use of slip coaches keeping the load below the 310 ton limit for the Castle Class. However the pre-eminence of the Castle class did not last long as the Southern Railway Lord Nelson class of 1926 topped them for tractive effort, and so the King class was developed, particularly with the heavy West-country holiday trains in mind. Their introduction from 1927 allowed arrival in Plymouth to reach the 4 hour mark, although the increased weight of these locos prevented their use in Cornwall. The King class were also permitted an increased maximum load of 360 tons between Newton Abbot and Plymouth; above this a stop was required to attach a pilot locomotive.

In 1935, new coaches in the shape of the 9 ft 7 in (2.9 m) wide Centenary carriages, but there were few other significant changes until World War II. At the outbreak of war all trains to the West Country were to travel via Bristol, and departure of the Cornish Riviera was moved to 14:35, although this change only lasted until October when the departure time returned to 10:30 with Exeter as the first stop.

By summer 1941 it seemed that everyone was taking their (brief) summer holidays in the West Country, and the Cornish Riviera ran in five sections for Penzance, St Ives, Paignton, Kingswear and Newton Abbot respectively. Ironically the Limited ran throughout the war, but was cancelled in the winter of 1946/47 due to a coal shortage, not being restored until the following summer. Nonetheless, in the summer 1952 timetable, the non-stop run had been extended to Truro, 279 miles from Paddington, although the working timetable showed a 4-minute stop at Newton Abbot to attach a pilot locomotive to assist over the South Devon Banks and a similar stop at Devonport to change locomotives as the King class locomotives were not permitted over the Royal Albert Bridge. The pre-WW2 schedules were not regained until autumn 1955 by which time the railways had been nationalised and the 1955 Modernisation Plan had been published. On 11 June 1956, chocolate and cream carriages were reintroduced on the service.

The service was dieselised in the late 1950s. D1000 Western diesel-hydraulics introduced in 1964 could keep the four-hour schedule to Plymouth even with a 500-ton train and an additional stop at Taunton. Further cuts in time saw Plymouth being scheduled in 3 hours 35 minutes before the Westerns were withdrawn in 1977 to be replaced by Class 50 Diesel-electrics hauling Mark 2d/e/f air-conditioned coaches. These were, in turn, replaced in autumn 1981 by HSTs.

Since privatisation, the service has been operated by Great Western Railway, still using HSTs. As at September 2016, the Cornish Riviera name is carried on the 10:06 from London Paddington and 08:44 departure from Penzance. It now follows the basic calling pattern of other London to Penzance services calling at most stations in Cornwall.

== Motive power ==
The first trains were worked by City Class 4-4-0 steam locomotives, including 3433 City of Bath which worked the special demonstration train on 30 June 1904 that took the coaches down ready for the first public train the following day. In the early days the French 4-4-2 compound locomotive 102 La France was also used on the Cornish Riviera. After this, with the weight of trains increasing, the train was increasingly worked by larger two-cylinder 4-6-0 Saint Class locomotives.

In 1907 the more powerful Star Class four-cylinder 4-6-0s were introduced, which in turn were superseded by Castle Class 4-6-0s in 1924. Locomotives were usually changed at Plymouth, the train being worked through Cornwall by a local locomotive – a City or Duke class or later, a Hall Class 4-6-0. In 1927 the train became the responsibility of the new King Class 4-6-0s, but these were too heavy to cross the Royal Albert Bridge into Cornwall. In 1952 BR Britannia Class 4-6-2s worked the train west of Plymouth for a short period.

At various times visiting locomotives have been tested on this demanding roster. LNER A1 Class 4-6-2 4474 Victor Wild saw trials in 1925 as part of the locomotive exchanges between the GWR and the LNER, but while keeping time the loco used much more coal than 4074 Caldicot Castle. Then in 1948 and 1955 ex-LMSR Princess Coronation Class 4-6-2s were similarly tried; on the second occasion the locomotive was 46237 City of Bristol. In 1956 the Kings were temporarily withdrawn for modifications, their place being taken on the Cornish Riviera by ex-LMSR Princess Royal and Princess Coronation class 4-6-2s 46207 Princess Arthur of Connaught, 46210 Lady Patricia, 46254 City of Stoke-on-Trent, and 46257 City of Salford.

During the early 1950s a King was the normal motive power for The Limited between Paddington and Plymouth, although with the advent of the BR Standard Britannia locomotives, these were also used.

In 1958 diesel traction took over on The Limited in the shape of the pilot D600 Warships. These however were not sufficiently reliable and D800 Warships began working the train by 1960, although the D600s, latterly shedded at Plymouth Laira and restricted in their range, could still be seen taking the service in Cornwall as late as 1961. D1000 Western Class locomotives took over in 1964 but the D800s returned in 1968 - 1970, now working in pairs. Westerns were not fitted for electric train heating and so were replaced by Class 50 locomotives when air-conditioned Mark 2 carriages were introduced in 1975 and although these were initially unnamed, they were soon given names of warships, some of which were once carried by the earlier Warship classes. Class 47 diesel-electrics also appeared from time to time throughout the 1970s.

The last locomotive hauled Cornish Riviera ran on 5 August 1979 hauled by Class 50 locomotive 50 039 Implacable and on the following day High Speed Trains were introduced to the service, although summer relief services (additional trains usually run in advance of the main train to cater for additional passengers) were still formed of hauled stock with a Class 50 (or similar) as late as 1983. Through to 2018 HSTs continued to be used with very little change in performance despite the inclusion of an additional coach in the 1990s, although with new engines fitted. In 2018 they were replaced by Class 802s.

== Timetable ==
These sample timetables give an idea of how the speed and calling points of the train have changed over the years. Times are for the London to Penzance service on Mondays to Fridays. Slip coaches and other portions detached from the main train are not included.

Date	Jul 1904	Oct 1920	Sep 1939	1959	1982	Sep 1986	Dec 2019
Typical motive power	City & Duke	Star & Mogul	King & Castle	Warship	HST	HST	IET
London Paddington	10:10	10:30	10:30	10:30	10:25	10:50	10:04
Reading	— —	— —	— —	— —	10:49	— —	10:29
Taunton	— —	— —	— —	12:47	— —	— —	11:46
Exeter St Davids	— —	— —	13:20	13:22	12:35	12:50	12:15
Newton Abbot	— —	— —	— —	— —	— —	— —	12:35
Totnes	— —	— —	— —	— —	— —	— —	12:47
Plymouth North Road	14:37	14:53	14:35	14:45	13:32	13:50	13:20
Devonport	— —	15:00	— —	— —	— —	— —	— —
Liskeard	— —	— —	— —	— —	13:58	14:17	13:44
Bodmin Road ♣	— —	— —	— —	— —	14:10	14:30	13:57
Par	— —	— —	15:33	15:44	14:19	14:40	14:07
St Austell	— —	— —	— —	— —	14:27	14:48	14:14
Truro	16:14	16:20	16:06	16:13	14:45	15:06	14:32
Redruth	— —	— —	— —	16:33	14:57	15:19	14:44
Camborne	— —	— —	— —	— —	— —	15:25	14:51
Gwinear Road §	16:46	16:52	16:35	closed	closed	closed	closed
St Erth	16:56	17:04	16:45	16:51	15:11	15:35	15:01
Penzance	17:10	17:15	17:00	17:05	15:22	15:46	15:10
Journey time	7hr 0 m	6hr 45 m	6hr 30 m	6hr 35 m	4hr 57 m	4hr 56 m	5hr 6 m

♣ Now named Bodmin Parkway

§ Closed on 5 October 1964

In the 1920s the maximum number of coaches for an individual train was 14 giving an overall gross weight of 520 to 530 tons, this being reduced during the journey as coaches were slipped. The number of coaches was reduced during the summer timetable as the Cornish Riviera Express ran as 2 portions

== Publicity ==
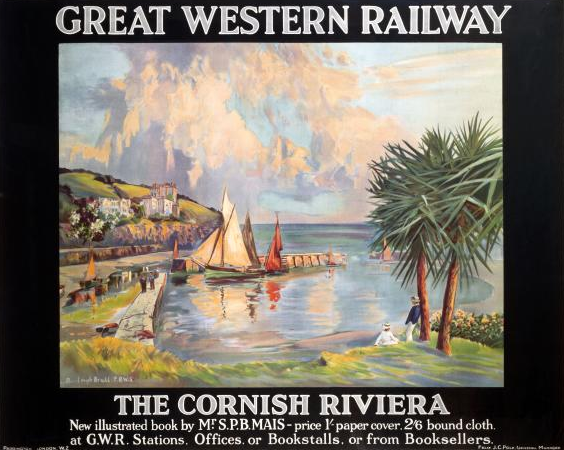
Poster by Louis Burleigh Bruhl 1928

In addition to the Cornish Riviera Express, the Great Western Railway promoted the "Cornish Riviera" in other ways. A poster campaign using the slogan See your own country first likened the climate to that of Italy and featured maps of Cornwall and that country which were arranged to show the similarity of the shape of the respective country and county. Postcards were also produced showing local views and a map of the "Cornish Riviera".

A series of books entitled The Cornish Riviera were published. The first was a 152-page book in 1904 – the first ever published by the railway company – written by A.M. Broadley, and revised several times, a total of five editions being published up until 1926. An abridged 36 page booklet was also produced for free overseas distribution. In 1928 a new version of the book, written by SPB Mais made its first appearance, with revised editions published in 1929 and 1934. In 1928 a poster featuring a painting by Louis Burleigh Bruhl was issued to advertise both the book and the railway service.

Other publicity featuring the Cornish Riviera Express were a jigsaw and a lantern-slide lecture which could be hired for shows to interested groups around the country.
