= Slip coach =

Train cars detachable from rear of a moving train

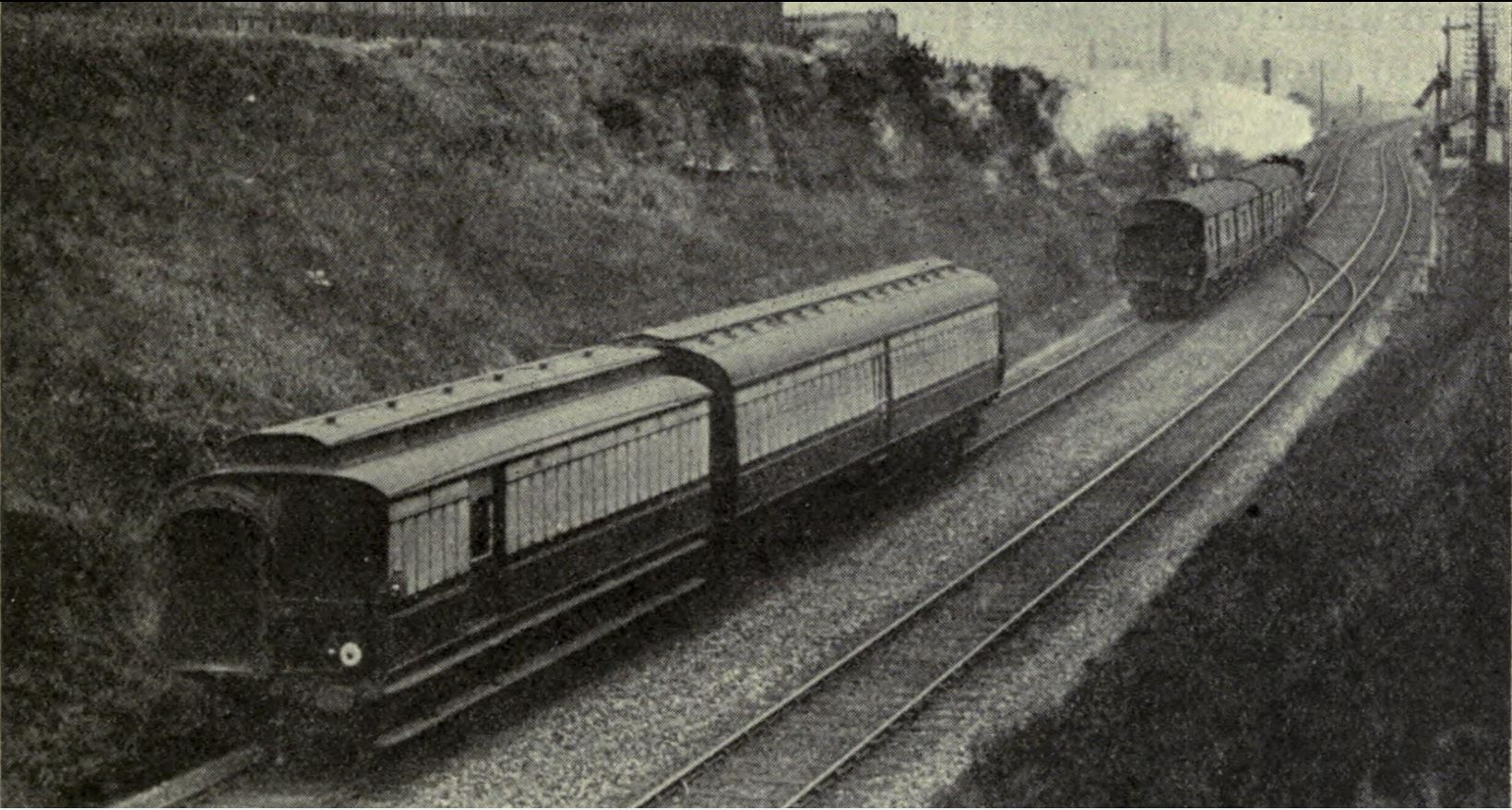
Slipping G.W.R. Mail coaches at Pylle Hill, Bedminster, Bristol, UK

A slip coach, slip carriage or slip portion in Britain and Ireland, also known as a flying switch in North America, is one or more carriages designed to be uncoupled from the rear of a moving train. (Note: A slip coach or carriage implies a single vehicle, but a lot of slips involved multiple vehicles all being controlled by one slip coach, hence the phrase slip portion. The size of slips changed over the years from one to many carriages. All three terms are used interchangeably in this article.) The detached portion continued under its own momentum following the main train until slowed by its own guard using the brakes, bringing the slip to a stop, usually at the next station. The coach or coaches were thus said to be slipped from the train without it having to stop. This allowed the train to serve intermediate stations, without unduly delaying the main train.

Slip coaches as described above were mainly used in Britain and Ireland from 1858 until 1960; for most of this period there was serious competition between railway companies who strove to keep journey times as short as possible, avoiding intermediate stops wherever possible.

Competition increased as locomotives became bigger and able to haul heavier trains at faster speeds for longer distances, trains no longer needed to stop so often, for fuel and water for themselves, using water troughs (North America: track pans) to fill up on the move, or for facility stops for passengers by providing corridor coaches, dining and sleeping carriages. Faster services were becoming progressively safer as more efficient continuous braking was fitted and the absolute block system installed on main lines. All these led to the use of slip services in some places where there was a financial advantage to the company to provide it.

== Disadvantages ==
There were disadvantages to slip coaches. The slip portion was mostly isolated from the main train and its facilities such as a restaurant car; this didn't matter in the early days, for at that time it was not possible to move through a train from carriage to carriage. Gangway connections began to be used from 1882 and throughout a train by 1892, but most slip connections were not fitted with gangways, even if the rest of the train was. The LNWR seems to have been the only exception, using slips with gangways for a few months before the First World War.

The slip service needed additional staff – at least one extra guard for the slip portion and possibly the use of a locomotive and its crew (or sometimes a horse) if the slip wasn't able to reach the platform; often the slip portion would be attached to another train or locomotive for an onward journey. While these additional staff requirements were lower than if an additional train had been provided, they were still substantial. If the weather was bad, usually because of snow or fog, it might not be possible for the slip to be safely effected, in which case the train usually halted to detach the coach.

Slip carriages were also confusing to some passengers: there are frequent reports of passengers who boarded the wrong carriage of a train and ended up at an unintended destination. This could occasionally lead to passengers causing trains to stop by using the emergency communication system.

Slip carriages are quiet: they are usually equipped with a horn to sound warnings to people near the track if there is time, but their silence has proven fatal, as in the case of a railway worker whose inquest returned a verdict of accidental death when he stepped into the way of a recently released slip at Market Harborough.

A few examples of slips being used in other countries will be found below. In some countries, such as India, the term slip coach refers to a coach that terminates its journey at a station prior to the final destination of the rest of the train. The coach or coaches are left behind after being detached from the train while it is stationary.

Slipped coaches were often also through coaches in that they often continued to another destination either by having a separate locomotive attached or by being attached to another train.

== History ==
The earliest example of slipping occurred on the London and Greenwich Railway (L&GR) when it opened in February 1836 between Deptford and Spa Road. There was limited space at the terminals; they consequently used a system known as fly-shunting. The system allowed the company to operate three trains with a single locomotive. There were two platforms at each end of the short, 2-mile-5-chain (3.3 km) line, as a locomotive and its train approached the points before a terminus the driver would signal the guard who would detach the carriages from the locomotive and apply his brakes to slow down while the locomotive ran through the points to another waiting train, the points would be changed after the locomotive had passed and the carriages run into the platform under their own momentum and brakes. The locomotive and its new train then proceeded to the other terminus where the process would be repeated. (Note: Railways in the United Kingdom are, for historical reasons, measured in miles and chains. A chain is 22 yards (20 m) long, there are 80 chains to the mile.)

Samuel Wilfred Haugton, the locomotive superintendent of the Dublin and Kingstown Railway following a visit to the L&GR in September 1849 took the technique back to Ireland, where following alterations to locomotives and installation of semi-automatic points, it remained in use for several years.

Another early example of slip services was on the Hayle Railway which started passenger operations in 1843. The company operated three daily mixed mineral and passenger trains with the passenger coaches at the rear of the train, and the practice approaching Hayle was to uncouple the passenger portion while the train was in motion, let the mineral train negotiate a set of points which were then switched allowing the passenger coaches to coast (sometimes with the assistance of a waiting horse) to the passenger station. These trains were still running in 1850 despite there having been a non-fatal accident in 1843.

The first certain example of slipping coaches off a moving passenger train was at Haywards Heath on the London, Brighton and South Coast Railway (LB&SCR) in February 1858 when the 4 p.m. train from London Bridge to Brighton which ran non-stop from East Croydon to Brighton slipped a portion for Lewes and Hastings. The portions were connected with a patent coupling and the instructions to the staff made sure the side chains were not connected. (Note: No details of the patent coupling device have survived.) (Note: The coaches in use would have been four- or six-wheeled without continuous brakes; they had the normal central coupling but also had side chains to give added stability.) The complete train was to slow as it approached Haywards Heath, the slip to be effected, and the slipped portion to slow itself to arrive gently at the station platform. Once the slipped portion had stopped at the platform the engine to haul it to Hastings was allowed to exit the siding where it had been waiting and attach itself to the front of the new train. The slipping was coordinated by a series of communication bell signals between the guards on the two portions of the train and the locomotive crew.

The Great Western Railway (GWR) followed suit when on 29 November 1858, carriages were slipped at Slough and Banbury off London Paddington to Birmingham trains. (Note: Off the 9:30 a.m. from Paddington at both Slough and Banbury according to Macdermot, or off the 5:10 p.m. from Paddington at Slough according to Fryer.) The slip service being introduced in December 1858 with a slip at Banbury off the 9:30 a.m. from Paddington.

The South Eastern Railway (SER) was an early user of slip services: there is a possibility that it began this a month before the LB&SCR, in January 1858. That month's timetable contained details of the 4.25 p.m. from Charing Cross to Hastings that leaves...passengers at...Etchingham...:train does not stop at Etchingham. There is a similar note regarding another train and Godstone: how the trains left passengers without stopping is not explained, but there is no corroborating evidence to indicate the use of a slip. The SER was using slip services in 1859 when the 12.20 p.m. London Bridge to Ramsgate slipped a portion at Canterbury.

The remaining British railway companies adopted slipping with varying degrees of enthusiasm, with 58 daily slips being made by nine companies in 1875, rising to 189 being made by 12 companies in 1914, when slipping was at its peak. During the First World War slip services almost disappeared, for there were fewer staff available to operate any service, and slip services needed an additional guard compared to the train stopping. After the war, slip services did not attract any priority; services were necessarily slower than normal because the railway suffered from a maintenance backlog, there was still a shortage of staff, and companies were uncertain what the future held after the railways had been under Government control during the war. In 1918 there were eight daily slip services; this had risen to 31 at the Grouping, and reached a post-war peak of 47 in 1924.

Slip services gradually fell out of favour, for many reasons. In the south-east the railways were electrified, allowing faster acceleration; elsewhere trains were travelling faster, and hence able to stop (thus enabling them to pick up more passengers) instead of using slipping coaches, yet without a later arrival time. Perhaps the most compelling reason, according to The Manchester Guardian, was the lack of corridor connections to the rest of the train: slip-coach passengers could not access the restaurant car.

=== Early rope working slip ===
The London and Blackwall Railway (L&BR) in east London, England, opened in 1840, running from Minories (Fenchurch Street from 1841) to Blackwall. It operated as two independent side-by-side railways, each worked by stationary engines and a rope which was wound on and off large drums at each end of the line. The carriages would start off at four stations and the process was as follows:

- Five carriages connected together would leave Fenchurch Street, coasting using gravity to Minories, where they would be stopped.
- The five carriages, and a sixth one waiting here, were attached to the rope; concurrently single carriages would be attached at Shadwell and Stepney.
- When all eight carriages were attached, and the confirmation telegraphed to the destination terminus, the rope would be started.
- As the rearmost carriage approached its destination the guard would release it, bringing the carriage to rest using his brakes. This happened at Stepney, Limehouse, West India Docks and Poplar, leaving the remaining four carriages to be released shortly before Blackwall, into which they coasted under their own impetus.
- The rope then stopped.
- The opposite then happened: four coaches were free-wheeled out of Blackwall; all eight coaches at the various stations were attached to the rope; a telegraph signal told the engine operator all was attached; and the rope wound in the opposite direction, slipping coaches at Stepney, Shadwell and Minories, at each of which one coach stopped; and five coasted into Fenchurch Street.

This process was then repeated, the whole process taking 30 minutes; a fifteen-minute service was achieved by the other line operating in the opposite direction. The system worked quite well, so long as the cables did not break. The line was converted to locomotive haulage in 1848.

== Slip operation ==
=== Carriage design ===
Design principles for slip coaches would have been the same as for most other coaches, with a few modifications:

- they might need to cater for all classes of traveller, although this would not be as necessary if the slip coach was to be used in conjunction with others to make up a slip portion.
- they would need a guard's compartment equipped with slip and braking controls at at least one end, coaches with a suitable compartment at both ends could be used in either direction without the use of a turntable.
- the slip guard would need to see forwards once the slip was effected, so the end had to have windows; in some cases the guard needed outside access to effect the slip, in which case the window needed to open.
- toilet facilities may be required for longer trips.

Not all slip carriages were originally designed as such; often a carriage would be converted, at least in the early stages of a company's operations.

=== Block working and lights ===
Block working was the normal way of train signalling which ensured an interval of space was maintained between trains, the normal rule was that only one train was allowed in a block at a time, once a train slipped a coach there were two trains in a block and regulations had to be created to overcome this problem and still work safely.

Trains were fitted with a red tail-lamp so that signalling staff could tell the train was complete when it passed a signal box, no tail-lamp indicating that the train had divided somehow and part of the train was still in the previous section of track. Special arrangements had to be made for slip portions to show this was deliberate, in 1897 the Railway Clearing House published guidelines to standardise these arrangements. If there was only one slip portion it had to carry a red and a white light set between two red tail lamps, one above the other, if there were two slips to be made the first to be detached was marked as described and the last slip had to carry a red light beside a white light, and in one case, the Cornish Riviera Express took three slip portions, the middle slip had a triangle of three red lights.

=== Slipping mechanism ===
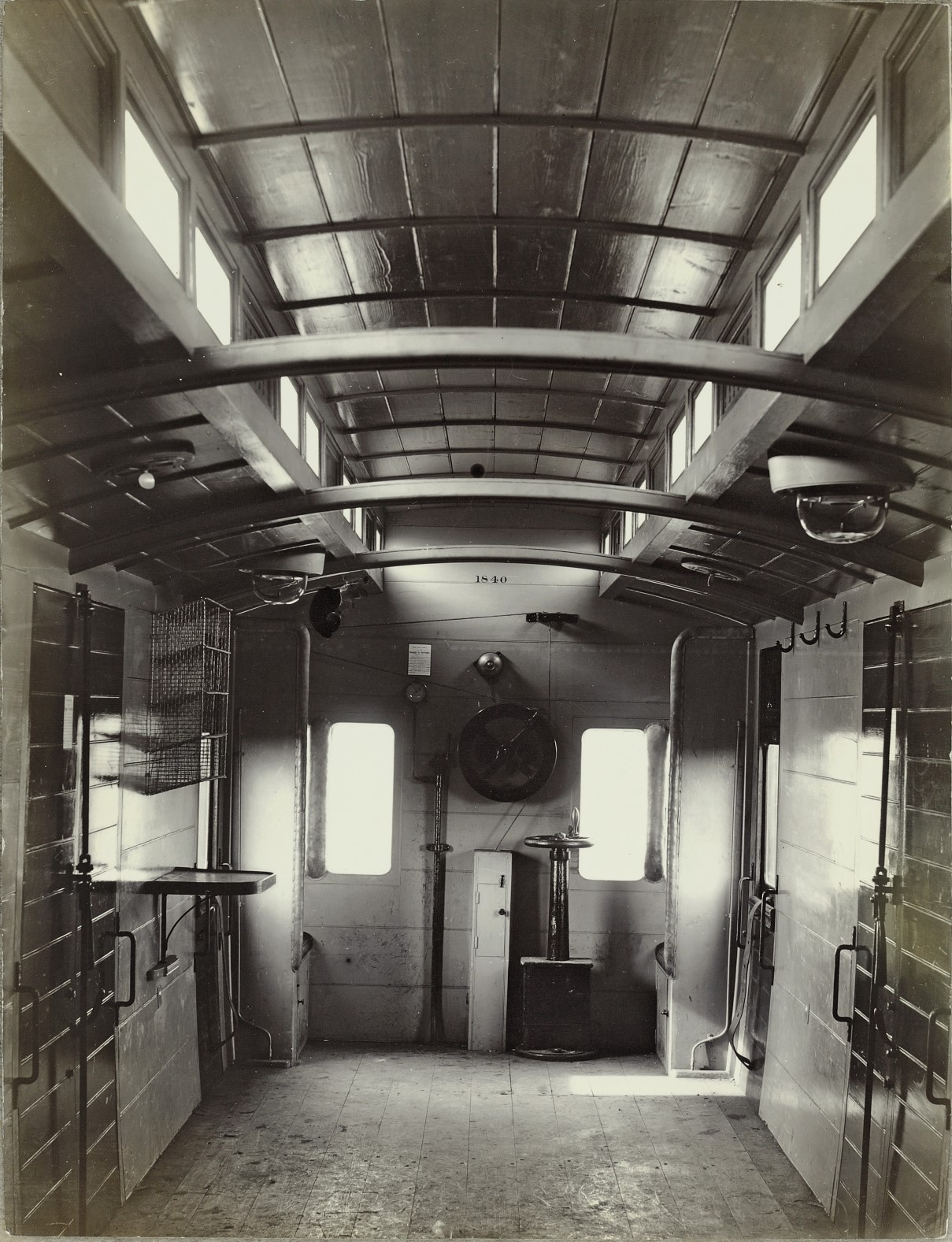
Interior view of NER brake van No. 1840 with slipping mechanism on the front wall

There were two main types of slipping mechanism:

- In the first type, the outer shackle of a three link screw coupling was hinged, it was held closed by spring latch. The slip guard operated it by a rope release which released the spring which in turn allowed the screw coupling to open and release from the main train.
- The second type uses a modified hook on the front of the slip coach. The front part of the hook is hinged so that it opens forwards and releases the main train screw coupling. The hook is held closed by a bolt operated by a lever in the guards compartment.

A method was also required to disconnect any continuous brake system running through the train, this was usually managed by the slip guard turning a stop or slip cock, this closed the pipe off from the main train. In later years trains were often steam heated with pipes running from the locomotive through the length of the train, these pipes had to be closed off prior to slipping, this was often done at the station before the slip until pipe connectors were invented that sealed automatically when the pipe separated.

=== On-train preparation ===
The slipping mechanism would usually only be used to connect the slip coach to the main train from the station previous to where the slip was to take place, prior to that the normal three link coupling would be used, this ensured the slip portion was not unduly put under strain, nor could it be inadvertently operated.

== British and Irish company operations ==
The following lists are snap-shots of slip services operated by the various railways, not all of the slips operated all of the time, there was no universal trend, each company judged when they thought it was financially advantageous to operate slip services.

=== Bristol and Exeter Railway (B&ER) later GWR ===
The B&ER introduced slip carriages in 1869 on its reinstated Flying Dutchman service between Bristol Temple Meads and Exeter St Davids. The train was run in conjunction with the GWR starting from London Paddington, the slip on the B&ER was made from the down train at Bridgwater. (Note: Down trains usually headed away from the major conurbation, in this case London, the slip was made on the train heading towards Exeter) Further slips were made from this train on the GWR section at Chippenham on the down train and Reading on the up.

Further slips were made off other trains at Yatton and Tiverton Junction.

=== Great Western Railway (GWR) later BR(W) ===
The GWR steadily increased its slip coach operations after the initial trial in 1858, most of the early slips were from down trains at Slough with the slipped portions going on to Windsor & Eton Central, as this service was reasonably short it was possible for the slip to be re-used, working back to London Paddington as an ordinary coach, a coach could make three such journeys during a day.

One unusual slip service occurred in 1866–1867 at Paddington itself, the 8.15 a.m. service from Windsor & Eton Central to Farringdon Street in the City of London via the Metropolitan Railway slipped a portion for Paddington mainline station while it went to Paddington (Bishop's Road) where it made an end-on connection to the Metropolitan Railway. The slip appears to have run on its own momentum into Paddington terminus where it was due three minutes after its host train arrived at Bishop's Road. (Note: Fryer (1997) suggests this slip was drawn into the terminus by another engine, whereas MacDermot and Clinker (1964) state the Service Time Book shows it running under its own impetus.)

By 1885, the GWR had 15 broad-gauge and 32 standard-gauge slip coaches in daily use. Slips were made at: Leamington, Knowle, Warwick, Reading, Maidenhead, Hatton, Banbury, Slough, Taplow, Twyford, Fenny Compton, Church Stretton, Wantage Road, Didcot and Bridgwater and other stations. Reading got the most slips with up to thirteen daily, nearly all off up trains, once detached the slip would be diverted across the down line into the platform. Some of the coaches made extended journeys being slipped several times before being returned to their start point. (Note: One, for example, went from Paddington, was slipped at Leamington, joined another train to be slipped at Knowle, from there it went as ordinary stock to Birmingham to form the following mornings slip at Warwick, then as a normal coach to Leamington where it formed the Reading slip on that train then to become the Maidenhead slip for Windsor where another overnight to be returned to Paddington as ordinary stock before starting over.)

GWR slip services continued to grow with forty-nine daily in 1900, peaking at seventy-nine in 1908 (Note: This was the largest number of slip operations carried out routinely by any railway company in the world.) then steadying at around seventy until 1914. In 1910 there were ten slips at Reading, six at Hatton providing through trains to Stratford-upon-Avon, five at Slough for Windsor & Eton Central, five at Banbury, four at Taunton and Bridgwater, connecting with the Somerset & Dorset Joint Railway to Glastonbury and twenty-two other places, including the slipping of a mail coach at Pylle Hill, Bedminster, Bristol.

One of the GWR's most well known express trains was the Cornish Riviera Express from Paddington to Penzance. From 1906 it had two slip portions, the first was slipped at Westbury which continued to Weymouth and the other at Exeter St Davids which continued to Torquay. A third slip was added in 1907 at Taunton which terminated there. The slips ceased during the First World War and restarted shortly after the war ended with slips at Taunton and Exeter, the Westbury slip returning the following year. In 1920 the Taunton slip started to continue on to Ilfracombe and Minehead. This pattern continued until 1935 when Westbury station could be avoided, a slip still took place but earlier on the line and the slip was worked by a locomotive coming out from the station for it. At the same time the Taunton and Exeter slips were stopped, being replaced by another train. This pattern of a single slip at Westbury continued until the outbreak of the Second World War.

The GWR introduced the first slip in South Wales when it acquired a long lease of the Manchester and Milford Railway in 1906, the slip was made at Carmarthen Junction going on to Aberystwyth.

During the First World War slipping tailed off on the GWR, down to thirty-four in 1916 and none in 1918, before a slow post-war revival. The company made thirty-one daily slips in 1922, rising to forty-seven in 1924, then slowly declining with forty in 1928 and twenty in 1938. Slipping ceased completely during the Second World War, and then just a few returned with five daily slips in 1946.

The Western Region of British Railways (BR(W)) continued some of the GWR slips after nationalisation, with the last multiple slip of two coaches taking place at Didcot on 7 June 1960 and the final single coach slip at Bicester North on 10 September 1960. (Note: This final slip was filmed for the BBC television programme Railway Roundabout.)

=== London, Brighton and South Coast Railway (LB&SCR) later SR ===
After their early start in 1858 the LB&SCR slowly adopted slip-coach practices with three services in 1875 rising to nine in 1900, by which time they had used them at seven different places. Some of their slips were of substantial train portions, for example the 8:45 a.m. express Pullman train from Brighton to London Bridge slipped several carriages at 9:39 a.m. at East Croydon bound for London Victoria where they arrived at 10:05 a.m., shortly before a similar substantial slip off the 8:30 a.m. Pullman from Eastbourne also slipped at East Croydon at 9:46 a.m.

The number of slips continued to increase with fifteen in 1910 (sixteen on Saturdays), twenty-three in 1912 and twenty-seven by 1914 by which time slips took place in ten different places in both up and down directions, at times there were twenty-one coaches slipped each day on the Brighton main line alone.

In 1914, slips were being made at Arundel, Ashurst for the branch to Tunbridge Wells West, Barnham Junction for Bognor Regis, East Croydon and Sutton for London Victoria and London Bridge whichever the main train was not going to, Haywards Heath then either stopping at Haywards Heath, going on to Lewes or forming a slow train to Brighton, Horley for stations to East Grinstead, Polegate of trains heading towards London for Hastings, Preston Park and Three Bridges for Eastbourne.

The use of slips slowed during the First World War, with fourteen in 1916 and just three in 1918. Despite the uncertainties they rose back to eighteen in 1922, but after the Southern Railway was formed their policy combined with a gradual electrification of the main lines reduced the need for slips and they had all stopped by April 1932.

=== Lancashire and Yorkshire Railway (L&YR) later LMS ===
The L&YR introduced its first slip service in the 1880s. (Note: The first slip was in 1886 according to Fryer (1997) or 1889 according to Marshall.) Most of the L&YR slips were made from westbound trains at Rochdale where portions were slipped to take either a slower route to Liverpool Exchange via Bolton Trinity Street and Bury Bolton Street or to Southport Chapel Street the main train continuing to Manchester Victoria and then running non-stop to Liverpool Exchange. By 1901, there were six Rochdale slips, seven in 1904, five in 1908 and just two in 1910 and 1914, the number of slips reducing because more of the trains made a stop at Rochdale.

The L&YR had other slip services including slips to Blackburn from Liverpool to Preston trains which were usually done at Midge Hall, shortly before Preston, but this slip was initially performed at Moss Lane Junction. One slip in particular has been called famous or the trickiest, the Accrington slip.

The slip had to be detached while descending the 1 in 40 Baxenden bank under brakes, but before entering Accrington station, where there was a speed limit of 5 mph, the vacuum had to be restored to provide enough brake power for the slip portion. Also because of the sharp curve through the station a man was needed on the platform to signal to the driver that the slip was in order. The whole operation demanded great skill.

From 1910, slips were also made at Kirkham from Manchester to Blackpool trains, the 5:10 p.m. from Manchester train took the route via Lytham to Blackpool Central the slip also went to Blackpool Central but by the direct route, arriving first. The 5:55 p.m. train also went to Blackpool Central, slipping a portion at Kirkham which went to Poulton-le-Fylde and Blackpool Talbot Road.

The L&YR continued to use some slips during the First World War; they continued into the London, Midland and Scottish Railway (LMS) era until they were withdrawn c. 1927 during the LMS economy drive.

=== London and North Western Railway (LNWR) ===
The LNWR was slow to adopt slipping with early services slipping at Watford, Blisworth for Northampton Castle and Leighton Buzzard, aside from the regular slips at Leighton Buzzard it had an as required slip service from Euston that provided a non-stop slip service for gentlemen joining the hunt at Leighton Buzzard, this service was discontinued in April 1877. These early slips had all ceased to operate by 1895, in 1896 a new slip service was run for a short period at Cheddington followed in 1897 by a new service at Leighton Buzzard after which there was a build-up of services, with eighteen daily in 1910 and nineteen in 1914.

Pre-First World War slips happened at:

- Nuneaton, two of which went on to Buxton via Ashbourne,
- Bletchley for Bletchley and Banbury via the Banbury–Verney Junction branch line,
- Blisworth for Northampton Castle, including an early newspaper slip in 1914,
- Leighton Buzzard with connections to Dunstable North,
- Rugby for Leamington Spa, these were withdrawn after 1910 as they became uncompetitive when the GWR opened a shorter, faster route,
- Rugeley Town for Shrewsbury and Welshpool, and
- Coventry for Coventry, this last slip had by 1914 been provided with a vestibuled gangway connecting it to the main train which allowed passengers to partake of the restaurant car.

The LNWR slips gradually stopped during the First World War and were not re-introduced.

=== Shrewsbury and Hereford Railway (S&HR) ===
Between 1868 and 1895, the GWR operated a slip service at Church Stretton on the jointly leased S&HR, the first known slip to operate on a cross-country line. The slips were probably taken on to Craven Arms Junction which connected with the Bishops Castle Railway, the Wellington to Craven Arms Railway and the Central Wales line.

=== Manchester, Sheffield and Lincolnshire Railway (MS&LR) later GCR ===
The MS&LR started to slip coaches at Worksop in 1886 in both directions off the express trains operated jointly by the MS&LR and the GNR between Manchester London Road and London King's Cross, in 1887 three slips were being made in each direction, they continued in operation until 1899.

From 1893 to 1899, the MS&LR had additional slips at Penistone which went on to Huddersfield and at Godley Junction where the slip went on to Manchester Central providing more connection opportunities.

After becoming the Great Central Railway (GCR) slips were stopped on former MS&LR lines except for one at Godley Junction which now went on to Liverpool, this slip survived until 1904.

In 1903, the GCR began to slip a coach from the 7:42 a.m. express from Sheffield Victoria which ran non-stop to London Marylebone, the coach slipped at Nottingham Victoria and then went to Leicester Central stopping at all stations. In the opposite direction, the 3:25 p.m. non-stop service to Sheffield slipped at Leicester, this slip going on to Nottingham, Mansfield Central, Grimsby Town and Cleethorpes, although by 1910 it terminated at Lincoln.

A through coach from Bournemouth Central was introduced in 1905, this coach was attached to a slip coach and both were attached to the 3:15 p.m. (later 3:25 p.m.) express from London to Manchester when it arrived at Sheffield, both were then slipped at Penistone, going on to Huddersfield and Bradford Exchange, this service lasted until 1914. At some time, the slips continued through to serve Grimsby Town and Cleethorpes again.

From 1907 until 1914, and then re-instated after the war, the 6:20 p.m. London to Bradford slipped at Woodford and Hinton at 7:40 p.m. the slip going on to Stratford-upon-Avon via the Stratford-upon-Avon and Midland Junction Railway. This service was competitive with the GWR service.

A commuter slip service was also introduced in 1907, albeit only on Saturdays and it only lasted nine months, a slip coach being attached to the 1.40 p.m. express leaving Marylebone it slipped at Amersham at 2:13 p.m. and went on to Great Missenden arriving at 2:24 p.m.

The Woodford slip was reintroduced after the First World War, going on to Stratford-upon-Avon from around 1920. About the same time a slip was trialled at Brackley from the same train; it lasted just over a year. It is not clear whether the two slips coincided or whether the Woodford slip was re-introduced following the failure of the Brackley one. By November 1922 there were definitely two slips being made from 6:20 p.m. The Woodford one as before and another one at Finmere which arrived at 7:28 p.m. This service catered for a cluster of residences of prominent people who lived close to the station and had "formed a sort of travelling club", including a director of the GCR and later the LNER. These two slips, both attached to the 6:20 p.m. from Marylebone continued for thirteen years until the Woodford and Hinton railway accident.

=== Midland Railway (MR) ===
The MR began slip operations in 1886 with one slip at St Albans, there were at least two daily slips in 1887, one at St Albans at 5:30 p.m. off the 5:00 p.m. Manchester Central and Liverpool Express, the slip was then attached to the 5:39 p.m. departure calling all stations to Bedford. The second slip was at Berkeley Road at 11:12 a.m. off the 6:40 a.m. Derby to Bristol Temple Meads with connections to Lydney and Lydbrook Junction.

There was a dramatic rise in slip numbers in 1888, with 25 daily slips taking place in eighteen different places:Ambergate, Ashchurch, Berkeley Road, Blackwell, Bromsgrove, Cudworth, Defford, Harpenden, Heeley, Kettering, Luton, Market Harborough, Melton Mowbray, Oakham, Rotherham, St Albans, Syston and Wigston. In other years slips were made at Chesterfield, Leicester, Loughborough, Saxby, Sharnbrook, Stonehouse and Tamworth.

By 1900, slips had dwindled to 5 daily but then increased again to sixteen in 1903, fifteen in 1910 and nineteen in 1914. All were at stations that had previously been used except for two daily slips at Saltaire (introduced in 1910) off the 3:58 p.m. and 4:42 p.m. trains from Carlisle to Leeds and London St Pancras which went forward to Bradford and at Wellingborough, this slip which was introduced in 1914 being unusual as the slip vehicle was used twice in the same journey. It was attached at Kettering, slipped at Wellingborough, then attached to another train and slipped again at Luton. Slipping stopped during the First World War and was not resumed afterwards.

=== Great Northern Railway (GNR) ===
The GNR began its slip operations in 1864 and then built the number up steadily until the end of the 1880s, peaking at thirty in 1883. In 1885, it slipped the most of any company. The numbers of daily slips were fifteen in 1875, twenty-seven in 1880 and 1885, seventeen in 1890, nine in 1895, six in 1900 then down to one by 1908, albeit one off the Flying Scotsman from Edinburgh to London at Doncaster which continued until 1916 when the GNR stopped slips completely.

Most of the GNR slips were at principal stations with a few exceptions in the earlier days. Hitchin had up to eight daily slips for the Royston and Hitchin Railway to take on to Cambridge, in 1872 the 10:10 a.m. and the 2:45 p.m. trains from Kings Cross and the train due to arrive at Kings Cross at 11:55 a.m. all slipped at Hitchin for Cambridge.

Hatfield had up to six slips probably for the St Albans and Dunstable North branches. Essendine also had up to six daily slips for the branches to Stamford East and Bourne on the Midland and Great Northern Joint Railway.

An unusual GNR slip service involved the 5:30 p.m. from London King's Cross; this train slipped a carriage at Huntingdon, and then another at Peterborough, and slightly later it stopped at Grantham where it picked up an additional slip carriage that was slipped at Newark before stopping at Retford, where it picked up yet another slip carriage which it slipped at Worksop, four slips in total from one train. This service was running in 1887, but had stopped operations by 1895. (Note: This service was so noticeable that Acworth reported it 1889 and 1900, Fryer references it in 1997 and Farr again in 2014.)

=== Great Eastern Railway (GER) later LNER ===
The GER started to slip coaches in 1872 and built up slowly with two slips in 1875, nine in 1880, seventeen in 1885, rising to a peak of twenty-five in 1904 then dropping to eighteen in 1914 and stopping altogether in the First World War.

A lot of the earlier slips were from up trains heading into London Liverpool Street with the slip going to London St Pancras, these slips took place at Chelmsford to start with then from Tottenham. These St Pancras slips reduced down to one by 1910 when there were also slips at Audley End going on to Saffron Walden, Broxbourne going to Hertford, Colchester, Ingatestone, Marks Tey going to, or connecting with the branch to Sudbury, Shenfield going through to Southend-on-Sea, Waltham Cross and Witham.

Slips were re-introduced after the war in much smaller numbers with two daily in 1921, it stayed at two although not always in the same places until 1937 when it went down to one, the final slip at Marks Tey stopping in 1939.

=== North Eastern Railway (NER) ===
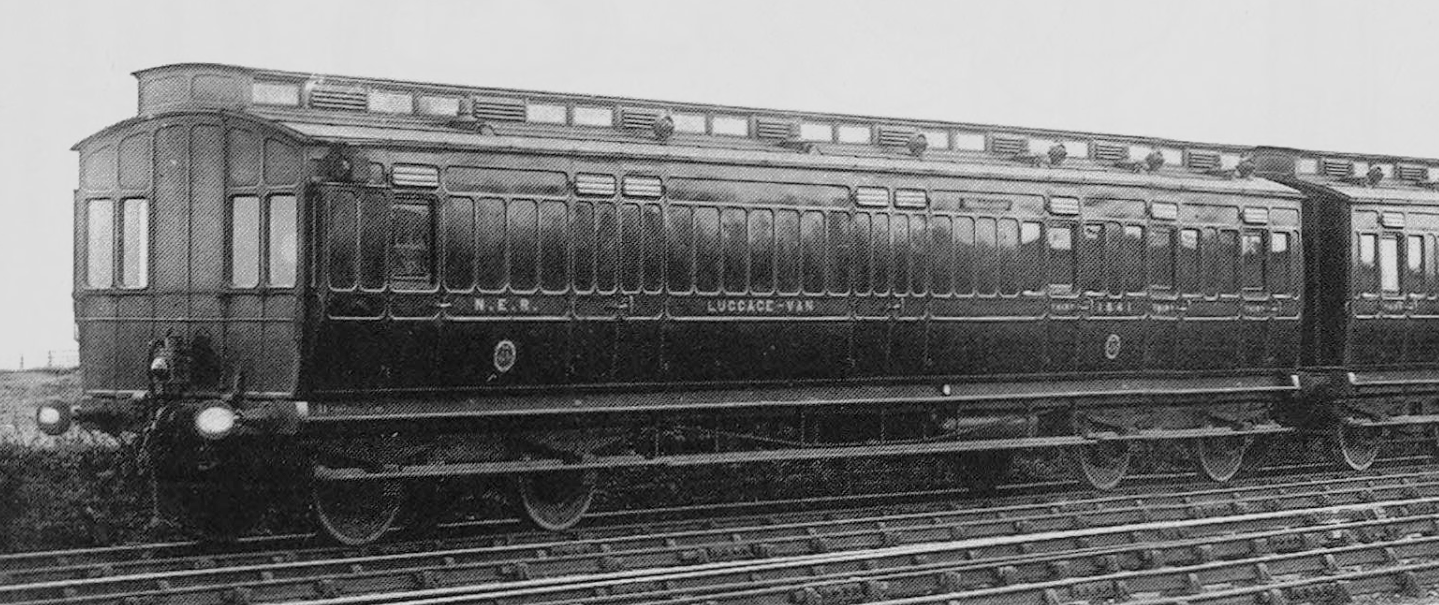
NER Brake Van Nr. 1841 used as slip coach

The NER didn't have much enthusiasm for slipping, at the most they had three per day, usually only one. They started in 1871 with a slip at Selby from a Hull to Normanton train, this lasted until 1877, when they started a slip at Tweedmouth for the Kelso branch, in 1895 this slip was from Normanton to Berwick train and it was attached to the train coming from Berwick going to Kelso a few minutes after arrival.

The NER stopped using slip coaches in 1905 and never started again.

=== North British Railway (NBR) ===
The NBR used slip coaches between 1870 and 1894, at most they had three slips in a day and from a maximum of five locations. The Waverley Route was first with slips occurring at Gorebridge, Stow and Longtown between 1870 and 1893. Two other slips took place, between 1873 and 1876 there was a slip from an Edinburgh to Glasgow Queen Street train at Polmont and from 1876 to 1893 there was a slip from an Edinburgh to Berwick train that went on to North Berwick.

=== Glasgow and South Western Railway (G&SWR) ===
The G&SWR only used slip coaches once from 1898 to 1901, where they slipped off the 4:15 p.m. Glasgow to Ayr at Irvine. The slip section was attached to an Ardrossan to Ayr stopping train, with which it followed the main train. Six-wheel brake vans with end windows were built for the service. (Note: Fryer (1997) notes the same details excepting that he says the express was going to Stranraer and the slip went to Ayr.)

=== London and South Western Railway (LSWR) ===
The LSWR used a slip coach for a brief period in the 1860s for the Chertsey branch line, this was re-introduced and joined by another service in the 1870s, the slips taking place at Weybridge or Walton & Hersham, these slips were still taking place in 1877, from Weybridge and in 1895 from Walton.

From 1891 to 1902, a slip was made at Feltham off the 5:40 p.m. down train from London Waterloo to Windsor which went on to Ashford. From 1894 there was a slip off the morning London to Portsmouth train at Petersfield and from 1896 to 1900 an evening slip at Winchester off the Bournemouth bound express, in 1902 the LSWR stopped using slips altogether.

=== South Eastern Railway (SER) later SE&CR ===
After being one of the pioneers of slip services the SER started using slips in more numbers from 1863, particularly in these early days at Caterham Junction to serve Caterham where it had up to eleven slips daily. The total number of slips across the SER gradually dwindled to four in 1875 and one in 1898, and they served different places at different times, Tonbridge had one or two in the early 1860s, then Sevenoaks had one or two during the 1870s, Paddock Wood had some for the Medway Valley branch to Maidstone West, the 1887 Bradshaw shows slips at Ashford off the Continental Mail Express and at Shorncliffe Camp off the Royal mail Express day Service, interestingly the slips are annotated "Carriages detached: the Train does not stop".

=== London, Chatham and Dover Railway (LCDR) later SE&CR ===
The LCDR started slips in 1872, usually with three or four daily, peaking at five in 1896. Slips were made from down trains at Beckenham Junction, Chatham and Faversham and from up trains at Herne Hill where the slip went whichever of the LCDR London terminals, Holborn Viaduct or London Victoria, that the main train didn't.

=== South Eastern and Chatham Railway (SE&CR) ===
In SE&CR pre-war days slips were provided at Ashford, for Hythe and Sandgate, Farningham Road or Swanley for Chatham, Faversham, Herne Hill and Shorncliffe. Slipping ceased during the First World War. After the war the SE&CR took up slipping again, the 1922 Bradshaw shows slips at Ashford, Herne Hill for St Paul's and Holborn Viaduct, Faversham for slow services to Margate and Ramsgate Harbour, and Swanley Junction, by 1924 the number of slips had gone down to three and they stopped altogether that summer.

=== Furness Railway (FR) ===
The FR started to use slips in 1887, this was unusual for a line with such a rural nature running trains of moderate speeds. The first slips were at Grange-over-Sands from trains between Carnforth and Whitehaven in both directions. From 1888 a slip was made during the summers at Ulverston that connected with an Isle of Man steamer service. From 1891 to 1899 a coach was slipped at Askam which followed its parent train stopping at all stations to Millom. There were also short-lived summer only slips at Arnside and Dalton. The Grange-over-Sands slips gradually reduced until there was only one, this finally ceased in 1916.

=== Caledonian Railway (CR) ===
The CR was a latecomer to slip services starting in 1904 with two slips at Lockerbie that had been attached at Carlisle. By 1908 they were slipping twelve times daily which continued until 1914, slips were being made at;

- Carluke and Cleghorn for commuters going on to Lanark,
- Coupar Angus for Blairgowrie,
- Crieff Junction for Crieff, Comrie and St Fillans,
- Falkirk for Grangemouth,
- Guthrie for stations to Arbroath,
- Larbert and
- Lockerbie.

=== Great North of Scotland Railway (GNSR) ===
The shortest lived of any company using slips was the GNSR, it introduced its first slip in the summer of 1914 at Banchory from an Aberdeen to Ballater train, it was withdrawn that autumn at the start of the First World War, and never re-introduced.

=== Belfast and Northern Counties Railway (BNCR) later NCC ===
The first slip trials in Ireland took place on the (BNCR) in 1893, when summer services between Belfast York Road and Coleraine or Portrush began to slip adapted brake coaches at Ballyclare Junction, Cookstown Junction and Ballymoney, the trials lasted for eighteen months but were financially unsuccessful. The slips ceased from the end of 1894 and were re-introduced for most summers at Cookstown Junction, Antrim and Ballyclare Junction from 1897. In 1910, the Northern Counties Committee (NCC) was still operating the slip from the 8:00 a.m. Belfast York Road to Portrush train at Ballyclare Junction going on to Ballyclare.

=== Great Northern Railway (Ireland) (GNRI) ===
The GNRI ran between Dublin Amiens Street and Belfast. In 1896, it began to slip a portion in the evening off a Belfast train at Malahide only nine miles north of Dublin to cater to commuters. The following year saw Skerries and Balbriggan also getting slip portions for their commuters. These slips continued until 1910.

The GNRI started slipping a coach at Drogheda in 1913 instead of stopping there. This slip continued throughout the First World War, by 1921 the slip was operated twice daily off the 3 p.m. and 6:35 p.m. trains from Dublin that otherwise ran non-stop to Dundalk, by 1923 it was just the afternoon train that slipped and this continued into the 1930s. It was the second last slip coach to be discontinued in Ireland.

During 1921 and 1922, a slip was made at Goraghwood from the same 3 p.m. departure from Dublin which was dropped in 1926 in favour of a border control stop. In the reverse direction a slip coach was provided for Warrenpoint slipping off the 5:30 p.m. train from Belfast at Goraghwood.

From 1921 to 1940, except for 1934–1935, a slip was made at Lisburn from the 9 a.m. (it ran at 9:15 a.m. in 1922) Dublin to Belfast, this slip then took the branch to Antrim and Portrush avoiding Belfast altogether.

In 1932, the 3:15 p.m. northbound from Dublin to Dundalk achieved the first scheduled mile-a-minute (60 miles per hour (97 km/h)) run in Ireland whilst slipping a coach at Drogheda.

=== Great Southern and Western Railway (GS&WR) later GSR ===
Coach slipping started on the GS&WR in 1901, when a coach was slipped from the early morning Limited Mail from Dublin Kingsbridge to Cork at Kildare, later that year two of the other expresses on that line slipped portions at Limerick Junction for Limerick and one, the 6:10 p.m. slipped at Portarlington for Tullamore and Athlone. The Limerick portions only lasted for a year and were replaced by a service that slipped at Kildare and Ballybrophy before taking the line to Limerick through Nenagh.

The GS&WR began introducing slip coaches in November 1900. (Note: There had been an unsuccessful trial slipping wagons off trains into North Wall in 1887) By 1902, the working of slips was regularly about six each day on down trains. (Note: In this case they would going away from Dublin.) The service peaked in 1913 with slips at:

- Sallins for Tullow,
- Kildare for Kilkenny and Waterford,
- Portarlington for Athlone,
- Ballybrophy for Limerick,
- Thurles for Clonmel and
- from 1902 to 1914, there was a twice daily unusual slipping of a coach at Conniberry Junction, trains were combined at Maryborough with the main train going on to Waterford and the slip for Montmellick, the slip was attached to the main train for two minutes before slipping, it was then collected by a locomotive attaching to the rear of the slip.

Most of the slips stopped during the First World War, with just two at Ballybrophy continuing. After the war some slips were re-introduced including one at Sallins and one at Kildare.

=== Belfast and County Down Railway (BCDR) ===
From 1902 to 1918, the BCDR operated a slip off the Saturdays' only noontime Belfast Queens Quay to Newcastle at Comber. In 1902, the Donaghadee Golf Club asked for a "Golfer's Express" service. The response was to convert a brake third into a slip coach to be detached at Comber. The more usual Irish and British practice was for the slip _ coach guard to effect the uncoupling. But here it was done by the guard of the main train, who was helped by marker posts. First he disconnected the vacuum hoses, making sure that this did not cause a loss of pressure in the main train. Then he satisfied himself that the train was going fast enough to get away from the slipped portion. If visibility was poor or other conditions were not right for the slip, it did not go ahead. The Comber Station Master had authority to stop the train and have it uncouple in the ordinary Way.

As soon as the slip coach guard knew that he had been detached, he used his hand brake to make sure that he did not catch up with the main train, which had itself to slow for the curve south of the station. Then he used his vacuum brake to stop in the platform. Up to five ordinary coaches could be attached to the slip coach. They were taken non-stop to Donaghadee by an engine which had worked light from there to Comber. Journey time from Belfast was 39 minutes. The slip coach ended in April 1918, as a “temporary” wartime measure. It never resumed but was replaced by a semi fast train at 12:12 p.m. each Saturday taking 44 minutes to Donaghadee with six stops.

=== Midland Great Western Railway (MGWR) ===
The MGWR had a daily slip between 1909 and 1914 at Enfield, which went on to Edenderry, the slip was made from the 4:50 p.m. Dublin Broadstone to Galway service. The slip was year round with an additional slip on the 8:45 a.m. during the summer. Both slips stopped during the First World War; after the war a slip was reinstated on this route, attached to the 2:30 p.m. from Dublin being slipped at 3:15 p.m. The MGWR also had a slip at Inny Junction serving Cavan for a short while during the summer of 1918.

=== Great Southern Railways (GSR) ===
The GSR, from its formation in 1925, continued the GS&WR slip at Kildare for Kilkenny and Waterford. A slip was introduced at Portarlington between 1926 and 1928, and the last slip in Ireland was made at Kildare from the 9:30 a.m. Dublin Kingsbridge to Cork in 1940.

== Slip coach incidents ==
The process of slipping increases the risk of collision if suitable precautions are not taken. The locomotive crew must be sure they have a clear route through the slipping station, the slip guard must also know the route is clear before attempting to slip because if the main train needs to stop after the slip has been effected there is a danger of the slip running into the back of it, this sometimes required the provision of additional signals.

Conversely, there needed to be a procedure for when the slip guard was unable to effect the slip, this usually involved the train having to stop to detach the coach in the station. Similar situations could occur when the weather was foggy or snowing.

Slipping procedures usually insisted that the slip guard was to only use the hand brake to control the braking of the slip, the continuous brakes were to only be used in an emergency.

=== Tunbridge 1866 ===
On 30 September 1866, four carriages which had been slipped from a Dover bound train ran through Tunbridge station and collided with the back of an empty carriages train. Eleven people were injured. The officer conducting the inquiry concluded that the accident appears to have been the result of a hazardous system of working, and the inexperience of the guard of the detached portion of the train.

=== Market Harborough 1879 ===
A railway worker walking along the track close to Market Harborough stepped out of the way while an express went by but then stepped back into the way of a recently released slip which killed him.

=== Slough 1880 ===
On 12 November 1880, a slip at Slough off the 5:00 p.m. express to Plymouth going on to Windsor & Eton Central, incidentally carrying Princess Christian and Princess Victoria of Holstein-Augustenburg, collided with the rear of the main train when it stopped unexpectedly, there were no injuries. The cause was apparently that one of the slip coach tail lamps had gone out, the signalman only seeing one light assumed the train had had an unscheduled split and part of it had been left behind.

=== Halesowen 1883 ===
On 12 August 1883, there were alterations being made to Halesowen station and a train with a slip coach was manually signalled to the platform, where the slip was performed, shortly after the platelayers foreman signalled the train and it stopped with the slip coach colliding into the back of it.

=== Werrington 1887 ===
On 14 March 1887, the single slip carriage which was to slip at Essendine became detached from the main train and then ran into the back of it when the train suddenly stopped probably caused by obsolescent coupling and brake equipment. Ten people were injured.

=== Reading 1894 ===
On 15 May 1894, a single coach had been slipped off the back of an express train out of Paddington, it ran into the station and collided with a static passenger train in the platform. Five passengers complained of shock or bruises. The officer conducting the inquiry concluded that three staff: the slip guard, the signalman and the platform inspector all contributed to the accident by not fully obeying the rules laid down for slip coach operation in the station.

=== Warwick 1895 ===
On 21 December 1895, the slip at Warwick off the evening express from Birmingham Snow Hill was detached as normal but then the main train was stopped due to fog, the slip ran into the back of it slightly injuring three people.

=== Marks Tey 1906 ===
On 29 December 1906, Four carriages which had been slipped from an Ipswich bound train ran into the back of the main portion of the train it had been slipped from. Thirty-four were injured. The officer conducting the inquiry concluded that it was a combination of mainly slip guard error but the driver was also in error and foggy weather played a part.

=== Polegate 1908 ===
The slip for Hastings from the 4:05 p.m. express from London to Eastbourne was detached at Polegate whereupon the main train then stopped apparently due to the continuous brake malfunctioning and being applied, the slip collided with the back of it.

=== Southall and Hanwell 1933 ===
Two slip coaches bound for Weymouth attached to the Cornish Riviera Express from Paddington became detached between Southall and Hanwell on 12 April 1933, the trains automatic vacuum brakes brought the coaches to a safe stop.

=== Woodford and Hinton 1935 ===
On 19 December 1935, a through carriage to Stratford-on-Avon, attached at the rear of the 6:20 p.m. express from Marylebone to Bradford, was slipped at Woodford and Hinton. Shortly after this carriage had been detached, the main portion of the train stopped unexpectedly, and the slip carriage ran into the back of it. Eleven passengers and two guards were injured. The officer conducting the inquiry concluded that it was primarily a mechanical failure of the brake pipe separation that was at fault.

== Other countries ==
=== United States ===
In the United States a similar operation to slipping coaches is the flying switch:

Flying switch - A move in which the engine pulls away from a car or cars that it has started rolling, permitting the cut to be switched onto a track other than that taken by the engine. The engine speeds up, racing ahead of the moving cars and the switch is thrown immediately after the engine has passed, allowing the following cars to take the alternate route.

Whilst it would appear that flying switches were mainly used with freight trains it was not exclusively so. Flying switches were used extensively when Grand Central Depot opened in New York in 1871. The train shed was kept fairly quiet and smoke-free partly by the use of the “flying switch”

—designed to keep incoming steam locomotives out of the shed.

Here's how it worked: As a train heading for the depot emerged from the Park Avenue tunnel, the engineer would shut down the steam. The brake- man, precariously perched over the coupler that linked the engine to the first car, would release the coupler, yell out, and wave his right hand. The engineer would then throw on as much steam as he could and drive the now released engine full-steam ahead to a track alongside the shed.

A towerman who was watching closely would throw the switch back just in time to direct the rest of the train (now rolling along on its own momentum, without its engine) into the train shed. Brakemen onboard then turned the handbrakes furiously in order to stop alongside the passenger platform inside the shed. Amazingly, no serious accidents were ever recorded from this split-second maneuver.

The Boston and Maine Railroad used flying switches at White River Junction from mixed, freight and passenger trains, and had a fatal accident involving one on 8 March 1889.

The Old Colony Railroad used flying switches at junction stations, where slip coaches would be attached to a locomotive to continue on the branch line. The state regulatory body did not approve the practice, but did not have the authority to ban it outright. The Old Colony stopped using flying switches after an 1883 incident on the Milton Branch, three coaches were slipped at Neponset and collided with the waiting locomotive, whose crew had jumped clear just prior to the collision, which then ran crewless for three and a half miles before being switched onto a siding where it collided with freight cars.

=== France ===
Acworth (1900) reports on a French slip service at Le Pecq on the 5.10 p.m. train from the Paris-Saint-Lazare.

Two further French slips of more recent date belong to the same system - now the French National Railway Company, but when Acworth wrote, the Western railway of France. Both were introduced in the summer of 1933 in connection with a Saturdays Only non-stop express from Paris to Le Havre. The slip portions were dropped at Motteville for Fécamp and Étretat, and at Bréauté-Beuzeville for Saint-Valery-en-Caux.

=== The Netherlands ===
An early use of a slip carriage in the Netherlands made its appearance on the Dutch Rhenish Railway in October 1886. A non-stop express from Amsterdam to Rotterdam via Gouda slipped a carriage at Woerden for The Hague.

The Netherlands Railway Museum has, among a collection of destination plates affixed to the sides of carriages, one marked Sliprijtuig voor Hilversum - 'slip carriage for Hilversum' - coming from the Holland Iron Railway about 1900.

Slip carriages were also used at Bussum between 1895 and 1904.

== In preservation ==
A former GWR slip coach has been converted to holiday accommodation at St Germans.

== In fiction ==
In the 18th series of Thomas & Friends, three slip coaches from the Great Western Railway are introduced, and belong to Duck.

A short story The Slip Carriage written by Walter Thornbury was published in The Albion, an International Journal in 1873.

A short story The Slip Coach written by Emily Elizabeth Steele Elliott was published in 1873 in her book Stories for workers, by the author of 'Copsley annals'.

The Slip Coach Mystery: A Railway Adventure written by V.L. Whitechurch was published in the first issue of The Railway Magazine in 1897.

A Narrow Escape was published in Pearson's Magazine, 1897 where a wanted man disappeared from a train utilising a slip coach.

Cy Warman published a short story Jack Farley's Flying Switch in 1900 in his collection Short Rails.

In 1922 Harry Collinson Owen wrote a series of short stories about Antoine one of which includes a journey, by mistake, on the slip portion of the Côte d'Azur Rapide, that was slipped at Melun.

Cuthbert Edward Baines had The Slip Coach published in 1927, described in a Times advert as "A thrilling romance of crime". (Note: The book is catalogued at OCLC 557881271.)

Lynn Brock wrote The Slip-Carriage Mystery the fourth novel in his Colonel Gore detective series, published in 1928. (Note: Lynn Brock was a pen-name of Alister McAllister and editions of this story can be found under both names)

Herman McNeile, writing under his pen-name "Sapper", published Mystery of the Slip-Coach in his book Ronald Standish published in 1933, the story was also published in the anthology Blood on the Tracks in 2018.

The following are examples of the term slip being used for a through coach as the train in question, the Orient Express, had through coaches to several destinations, they were all uncoupled while the train was stopped.

- In Chapter 15 of The Mask of Dimitrios by Eric Ambler, the protagonist mentions having booked a seat on the Athens slip coach of the Orient Express.
- Agatha Christie mentions a slip coach from Athens in her story Murder in the Calais Coach, the title of the United States version of Murder on the Orient Express.
- Graham Greene's Stamboul Train - An Entertainment mentions the slip coach for Athens.

== See also ==
- Dividing train
- Through coach

== Sources ==
- Acworth, William Mitchell (1889). The Railways of England (1st ed.). London: John Murray.
- Acworth, William Mitchell (1900). The Railways of England (5th ed.). London: John Murray.
- Allen, Cecil J. (April 1907). ""Slipping the slip." An account of how slip coaches are detached from our express trains". The Railway Magazine.
- Ambler, Eric (1976). The Mask of Dimitrios. Glasgow: Collins. ISBN 9780330372435.
- Bairstow, Martin (2007). Railways in Ireland: Part two. Martin Bairstow. ISBN 978-1-871944-33-4. OCLC 931393119.
- Baker, Michael H. C. (1972). Irish Railways since 1916. Ian Allan. ISBN 0711002827.
- Bradshaw, George (2012) [March 1850]. Bradshaw's Rail Times for Great Britain and Ireland March 1850: A reprint of the classic timetable complete with period advertisements and shipping connections to all parts. Midhurst: Middleton Press. ISBN 9781908174130.
- Bradshaw, George (1968a) [August 1887]. Bradshaw's August 1887 Railway Guide: A Reprint of Bradshaw's General Railway and Steam Navigation Guide for Great Britain and Ireland. Newton Abbot: David and Charles.
- Bradshaw, George (2011) [December 1895]. Bradshaw's Rail Times for Great Britain and Ireland December 1895: A Reprint of the Classic Timetable Complete with Period Advertisements and Shipping Connections to All Parts. Midhurst: Middleton Press. ISBN 978-1-908174-11-6. OCLC 832579861.
- Bradshaw, George (1968b) [April 1910]. April 1910 Railway Guide. Newton Abbot: David and Charles. ISBN 978-0-7153-4246-6. OCLC 30645.
- Bradshaw, George (1985) [July 1922]. Bradshaw's General Railway and Steam Navigation guide for Great Britain and Ireland: A reprint of the July 1922 issue. Newton Abbot: David & Charles. ISBN 978-0-7153-8708-5. OCLC 12500436.
- Beck, James Howard (1978). Railtalk: a lexicon of railroad language. Gretna, Nebraska: James Publications. ISBN 0-931408-00-8. OCLC 1036837472.
- Bridge, Mike (2009). TRACKatlas of Mainland Britain. Bradford on Avon: Trackmaps. ISBN 978-0-9549866-5-0.
- Brock, Lynn (1928). The slip-carriage mystery : Colonel Gore's fourth case. London: Harper and Brothers. OCLC 74277627.
- Christie, Agatha (1960). Murder in the Calais Coach. New York: Pocket Books. ISBN 9780671774486. OCLC 849933623.
- Daniel, G.W.T. (July 1935). "Familiar Features of Operation - VI: Slip Coach Services". The Railway Magazine. LXXVII (457).
- Course, Edwin (1962). London Railways. London: Batsford.
- Davies, R.; Grant, M.D. (1984). Forgotten Railways: Chilterns and Cotswolds. Newton Abbot, Devon: David St John Thomas. ISBN 0-946537-07-0.
- Dow, George (1985) [1962]. Great Central, Volume Two: Dominion of Watkin 1864–1899. Shepperton: Ian Allan. ISBN 978-0-7110-1469-5. OCLC 655324061.
- Dow, George (1985) [1965]. Great Central, Volume Three: Fay Sets the Pace, 1900–1922. Shepperton: Ian Allan. ISBN 978-0-7110-0263-0. OCLC 500447049.
- Elliott, Emily Elizabeth Steele (1873). Stories for Workers. London: Seeley, Jackson, and Halliday.
- Farr, Keith (April 2014). "Many a slip...part 1". The Railway Magazine. ISSN 0033-8923.
- Foster, Richard D. (1997). "block working". In Simmons, Jack; Biddle, Gordon (eds.). The Oxford Companion to British Railway History From 1603 to the 1990s (1st ed.). Oxford: Oxford University Press. pp. 34–35. ISBN 0-19-211697-5.
- Fryer, C. E. J. (1997). A History of Slipping and Slip Carriages. Oxford: Oakwood Press. ISBN 0-85361-514-4.
- Gray, Adrian (1977). The London to Brighton Line 1841–1977. Blandford Forum: Oakwood Press. OCLC 4570078.
- Greene, Graham (1921). Stamboul Train - An Entertainment. London: William Heinemann.
- Hajducki, S. Maxwell (1974). A Railway Atlas of Ireland. Newton Abbot: David & Charles. ISBN 0-7153-5167-2.
- Harris, Michael (1997a). "carriages". In Simmons, Jack; Biddle, Gordon (eds.). The Oxford Companion to British Railway History From 1603 to the 1990s (1st ed.). Oxford: Oxford University Press. pp. 75–77. ISBN 0-19-211697-5.
- Harris, Michael (1997b). "slip carriages". In Simmons, Jack; Biddle, Gordon (eds.). The Oxford Companion to British Railway History From 1603 to the 1990s (1st ed.). Oxford: Oxford University Press. p. 454. ISBN 0-19-211697-5.
- Healy, John M.C. (1987). Great Central Memories. London: Baton Transport. ISBN 978-0859361934.
- Hosegood, John (1977). "Slip Coaches". Great Western Echo. No. 60. Didcot: Great Western Society. pp. 8–9.
- Humphrey, Thomas J.; Clark, Norton D. (1986). Boston's Commuter Rail: Second Section. Boston Street Railway Association. ISBN 9780938315025.
- Jackson, Alan Arthur (2015). The Wordsworth Railway Dictionary. Ware : Wordsworth Editions. ISBN 9781853267505.
- Jones, Kenneth Westcott (1965). Great railway journeys of the world. Brattleboro. OCLC 678577.
- MacDermot, E.T.; Clinker, C.R. (1964a) [1927]. History of the Great Western Railway, Volume I: 1833–1863 (First revised ed.). London: Ian Allan.
- MacDermot, E.T.; Clinker, C.R. (1964b) [1927]. History of the Great Western Railway, volume II: 1863–1921 (First revised ed.). London: Ian Allan.
- Marshall, John (1970). The Lancashire & Yorkshire Railway, volume 2. Newton Abbot: David & Charles. ISBN 0-7153-4906-6.
- Mason, Eric (1975). The Lancashire & Yorkshire Railway in the Twentieth Century (2nd ed.). Shepperton: Ian Allan.
- McNeile, Herman Cyril (1933). "Mystery of the Slip-Coach". Ronald Standish. London: Hodder & Stoughton. OCLC 504761207.
- McNeile, Herman Cyril (2018). "Mystery of the Slip-Coach". In Edwards, Martin (ed.). Blood on the Tracks: Railway Mysteries. British Library. ISBN 978-1-4642-0969-7.
- Murray, Kevin (1981). Ireland's First Railway. Dublin: Irish Railway Record Society. ISBN 0-904078-07-8.
- Murray, K.A.; McNeill, D.B. (1976). Great Southern & Western Railway. Dublin: Irish Railway Record Society. ISBN 0-904078-05-1.
- Nock, O.S. (1960). The London & North Western Railway. Ian Allan.
- Owen, Harry Collinson (1922). "The Temptation of Antione". The Adventures of Antoine. New York: The James A. McCann Company. pp. 1–47.
- Rich, Frederick (1996). Yesterday once more: a story of Brighton steam. Bromley: P.E. Waters & Associates. ISBN 978-0948904547.
- Robertson, Andrew John (1848). "Blackwall railway machinery". The Civil Engineer and Architect's Journal. 11 (March 1848). London: John Wiley & Sons.
- Ross, David (2014). The Glasgow and South Western Railway: A History. Catrine: Stenlake Publishing Limited. ISBN 978-1-84033-648-1.
- Scholey, K.A. (2012). London's great railway century: 1850-1950. Stroud. ISBN 9780752462912. OCLC 1245530186.
- Simmons, Jack (1970). "Netherlands Railway Museum, Utrecht". Transportation: a tour of museums. New York: South Brunswick. ISBN 9780498075735. OCLC 1151450674.
- Simmons, Jack (1997). "through carriages". In Simmons, Jack; Biddle, Gordon (eds.). The Oxford Companion to British Railway History From 1603 to the 1990s (1st ed.). Oxford: Oxford University Press. pp. 508–509. ISBN 0-19-211697-5.
- Stanley, Ed (2003). Grand Central Terminal : gateway to New York City. New York: Mondo. ISBN 9781590344927. OCLC 1149189579.
- Warman, Cy (1900). Short Rails. New York: Charles Scribner's Sons. ISBN 9780665157394.
- White, H. P. (1992). A Regional History of the Railways of Great Britain. Vol. 2 Southern England (5th ed.). Nairn, Scotland: David St John Thomas. ISBN 0-946537-77-1.
- Winchester, Clarence, ed. (1935). "The "Limited Mails" of Ireland: A Famous Train of the Great Northern Railway (Ireland)". Railway Wonders of the World.
- Wrottesley, John (1979). The Great Northern Railway: volume II: Expansion and Competition. London: B T Batsford Limited. ISBN 0-7134-1592-4.
