= Louis Burleigh Bruhl =

English landscape artist

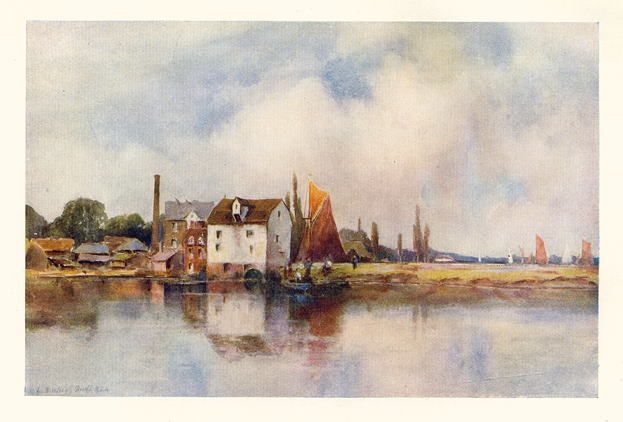
Stambridge Mill viewed from the Fleet, 1909

Louis Burleigh Bruhl (20 July 1861 – 1942) was an English landscape artist.

Bruhl was born in Baghdad, Ottoman Empire. He was educated in Vienna and England, and studied medicine at the London Hospital.

Burleigh Bruhl was President of the Dudley Gallery Art Society. and a member of the New Society of Artists; he was also president of the Watercolour Society.

In 1915 he published Essex water-colours which contained a selection of his Essex scenes. His work included publicity posters for the Great Western Railway.
