= The Cornishman (train) =

UK train service

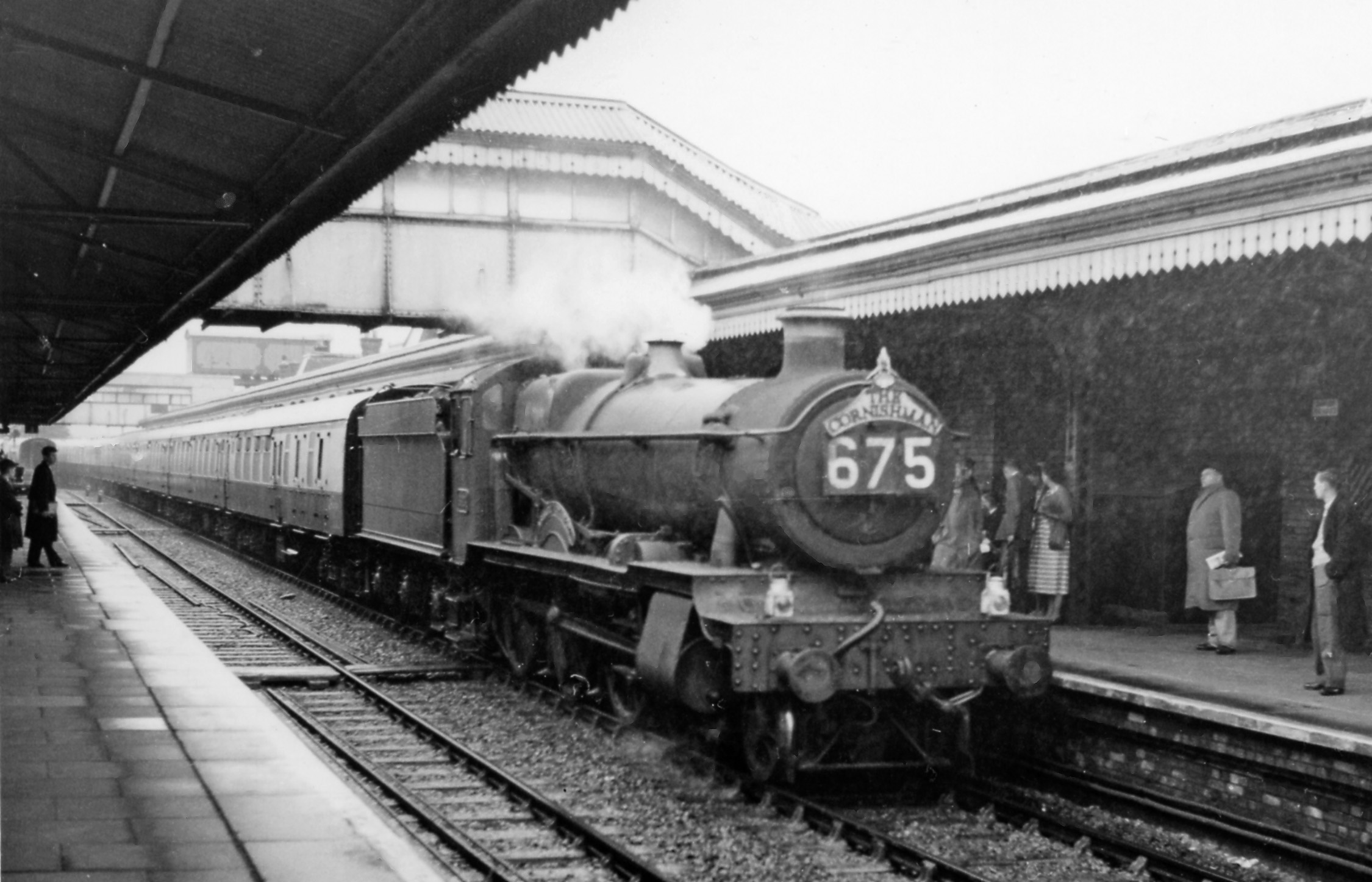
Down Cornishman at Truro in 1958

The Cornishman is a British express passenger train to Penzance in Cornwall. From its inception in the 19th century until before World War II it originated at London Paddington. Under British Railways the name was applied to a different service, starting variously from Wolverhampton, Leeds or Bradford. In 2006, First Great Western, now Great Western Railway, reintroduced the named service which now runs once per day from Monday to Saturday in both directions.

== Broad gauge ==
The Cornishman originates from the days of Brunel's broad gauge, first running in summer 1890 between London Paddington and Penzance in Cornwall. The down train left Paddington at 10:15, and called at Bristol at 12:45, Exeter at 14:20, Plymouth at 13:50, arriving Penzance at 19:50. At 8 hours and 35 minutes for the 325¼ miles, this made it the fastest train to the West of England, being 10 minutes faster than the Flying Dutchman. The Cornishman was also a popular train and was unusual for an important named train in conveying third-class passengers. On 20 May 1892 The Cornishman became the last broad-gauge express to leave London for Cornwall.

=== Locomotives and stock ===
As a broad gauge train, the section through south Devon was typically hauled by a 3501 class locomotive and consisted of four-wheeled coaches.

== London to Cornwall ==
In 1895 the Great Western Railway (GWR), now at standard gauge, laid water troughs at Goring and Keynsham allowing The Cornishman to be the first train to run non-stop between London and Bristol. The departure time from London was altered to 10:30, and after another reduction of 15 minutes in 1903 The Cornishman became the first train to be scheduled from London to Bristol in 2 hours.

The train had become so popular by 1896 that non-stop running was extended when a relief section for Newquay (Note: Nock gives Falmouth as the destination) was booked to travel from Paddington to Exeter non-stop, the longest non-stop journey in the world at that time, although the up train still called at Bristol until 1899. The train then called at Plymouth, Par and Newquay only in the down direction, with additional stops at Liskeard and Devonport in the up direction.

In July 1904, the GWR introduced a new express train to replace The Cornishman: the Cornish Riviera Limited, running non-stop from Paddington to Plymouth North Road station and then through Cornwall to Penzance. The Cornishman name was not used again until summer 1935, when it was re-introduced for the 10:35 relief to the Cornish Riviera Limited. The timetable showed the "Limited" running non-stop to Truro, although stopping to add a banker at Newton Abbot and to change engines at Devonport; The Cornishman had the Weymouth Slip coach, and contained portions for Plymouth, Newquay, Helston, St Erth and Penzance. In the up direction The Cornishman started at St Erth, and served Gwinear Road, Truro, and stations from Par to Plymouth. This was, however, a brief return as in the summer 1936 timetable the same train had returned to unnamed anonymity and ran on saturdays only.

=== Locomotives and stock ===
In 1893 the GWR built special Brake Third coaches for The Cornishman to Diagrams D10 and D11. Ten of these coaches were built being 56 ft long with 4 compartments, clerestory roof, a lavatory and through corridor connection.

Initial runs as a standard gauge train were hauled between Paddington and Exeter by 3031 class single wheelers with corridor stock, the train including a restaurant car as well from 1899, but after 1900 Atbara class locomotives started to be used.

In 1903 a visit by the then Prince and Princess of Wales paid a visit to Cornwall and to facilitate their travel, special coaches were attached to the first portion of The Cornishman. The first new-build City class locomotive No. 3433 City of Bath was specially prepared and a non-stop run to Plymouth achieved in 3 hours 53 minutes. This non-stop run was a significant factor in setting the Cornish Riviera Limited, the successor to The Cornishman, as running non-stop to Plymouth.

When the name was briefly revived in 1935 the heavy loading required a King class locomotive through to Plymouth with a pilot added over the south Devon banks. As the King class were not permitted over the Royal Albert Bridge a locomotive change was carried out at Plymouth with a 4-6-0 County, Hall class or Castle class the usual traction on the Cornish Main Line. As the relief to the Cornish Riviera, Centenary stock was usual on the train which included a restaurant car.

== Move to the Midlands ==
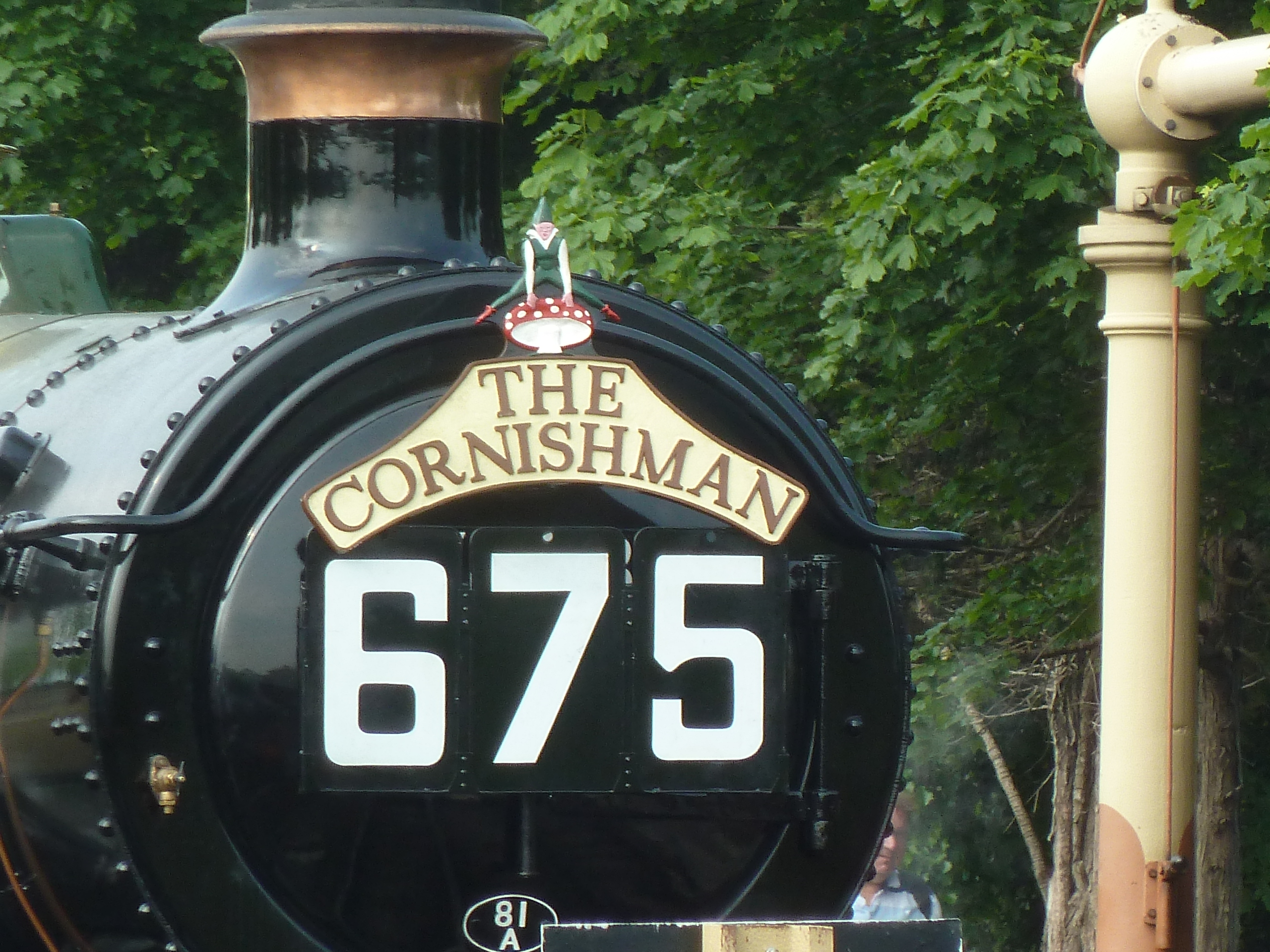
A modern replica headboard for The Cornishman

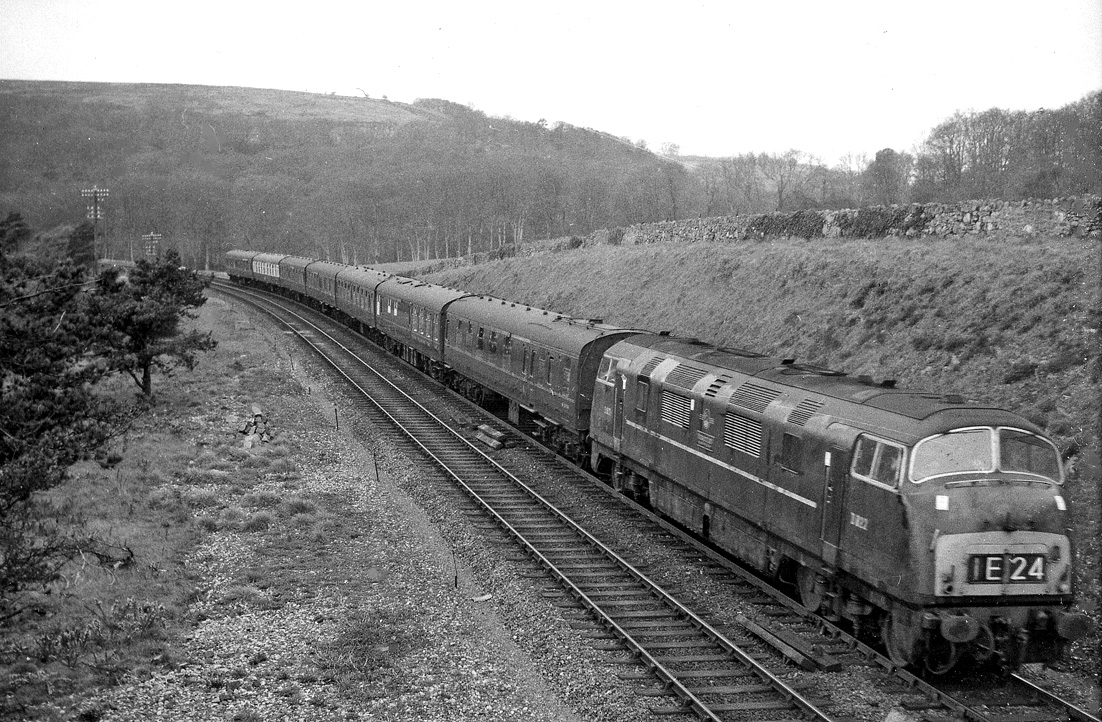
Diesel-hauled Cornishman at Ivybridge in 1964

In the 1952 timetable, the name The Cornishman was applied by Western Region of British Railways to a train from Wolverhampton Low Level (09:15) and Birmingham Snow Hill (09:50) to Plymouth and Penzance (17:55), travelling via Stratford-upon-Avon, Cheltenham Malvern Road and Bristol, and conveying a slip portion for Taunton. The return working left Penzance at 10:30, reaching Birmingham at 18:36 and Wolverhampton at 19:28. Catering was available throughout the journey and the train conveyed a portion for Torquay and Kingswear.

During the 1960s the northern part of The Cornishman's route underwent extensive changes. Starting from the Winter 1962 timetable, the train was diverted away from the GWR route from Honeybourne to Cheltenham and instead running via the faster ex Midland Railway route from Birmingham to Gloucester via the Lickey Incline. The train then ran not to Wolverhampton but over the former Midland line to Derby and Sheffield, and later on to Bradford Forster Square. By May 1967 departure was from Bradford Exchange at 07:06, then reversing at Leeds with a departure time of 07:36. This gave arrival times at Plymouth of 15:08 and Penzance at 17:55. In the reverse direction The Cornishman left Penzance at 11:00 and Plymouth at 13:30, arriving at Bradford at 22:07.

Further changes in the early 1970s saw The Cornishman start from Leeds on weekdays and Bradford on Saturdays. There were also changes to the route between Leeds and Sheffield, reverting to the former Midland lines rather than using a section of ex-Great Northern track. The additional stop at Wakefield Westgate which this had enabled was, however, retained.

=== Locomotives and stock ===
When reintroduced The Cornishman was hauled on the Western Region by Castle class engines, but towards the end of steam these were supplanted by 4-6-0 Counties. Initially the stock was of GWR origin, but as BR Mark 1 stock became available by the late 1950s this was used, but being a named train these were in chocolate and cream livery as opposed to the standard BR maroon.

During the early 1970s The Cornishman often brought Class 45 diesels right through to Penzance, while at other times a locomotive change at either Bristol or Birmingham would result in haulage by Western Region based locomotives such as the Class 52 Westerns. These trains were formed of Mark 1 stock with 13 coaches being a typical load. A restaurant car was included but did not operate west of Plymouth or north of Sheffield.

== Great Western Railway (TOC) ==
In 2006, First Great Western, now Great Western Railway began to use the Cornishman name once again, running from London Paddington to Penzance. It departs London at 15:03 and arrives in Penzance at 20:10. An up journey is made by the 16:15 from Penzance to London, running non-stop between Taunton and Reading, arriving in London at 21:24 (Monday to Friday in June 2024). The up service also offers Great Western Railway's on-board restaurant service, Pullman Dining.
