= Flying Dutchman (train) =

The Flying Dutchman was a named passenger train service from London Paddington to Exeter St Davids. It ran from 1849 until 1892, originally over the Great Western Railway (GWR) and then the Bristol and Exeter Railway. As the GWR expanded, the destination of the train changed to Plymouth and briefly to Penzance.

== Early history ==
The name Flying Dutchman has a convoluted history. In common with many steam and diesel locomotives such as a London and North Eastern Railway A1s and British Rail Class 55 'Deltic', the Flying Dutchman was named after The Flying Dutchman, a famous racehorse, which had won both the Derby and St. Leger in 1849. The racehorse was in turn named after the mythical ghost ship.

In 1845 the 09:30 morning express train between London Paddington and Exeter St Davids was taking 5 hours with stops at Didcot, Bath, Bristol and Taunton, this being reduced to 4½ hours during that year. In 1848 the train, now the 09:50 from London Paddington, covered the 53.1 miles to Didcot in 55 minutes, setting a world record start-to-stop average of 57.9 mph. The return train was the 11:45 from Exeter. In 1849, the Train took on the name "Flying Dutchman", and added a stop at Chippenham without extending the overall journey time. The up train time was changed to 12:30 which gave an arrival at Paddington of 17:00.

In the 1850s performance deteriorated, but the introduction of a service from London Waterloo to Exeter Queen Street (now Exeter Central) in 4¾ hours by the London and South Western Railway (LSWR) in 1862 resulted in the down Flying Dutchman being retimed to leave Paddington at 11:45 with the 1840s journey time of 4½ hours being restored. This was, however, a brief interlude and soon the time to Exeter has stretched to 5 hours and 5 minutes. At this time the train left Paddington with 7 coaches. Two were detached at Swindon; one for Weymouth and the other for Cheltenham, and after detaching 2 more at Newton Abbot for Torquay the remaining three coaches worked through to Plymouth. By 1867 the GWR was doing so poorly that the Flying Dutchman ceased running in October of that year.

== Later years ==
The Flying Dutchman began running again in 1869, taking 4¾ hours from Paddington to Exeter, but this was accelerated in 1871 when the LSWR began a service taking 4½ hours from London Waterloo; the Flying Dutchman was now taking 4¼ hours to Exeter and 6¼ hours to Plymouth, and during the summer was extending to Penzance although taking an extra 3 hours. By 1876 the LSWR, in extending their main line to Plymouth, introduced a train that reached Exeter in 4 hours and Plymouth in 6 hours 38 minutes, and also carrying third class passengers in contrast to the GWR express which only carried First and Second class passengers. In 1879 the Flying Dutchman, still running on the broad gauge, was equalled by a new train The Cornishman which departed Paddington at 15:00 and also carried third class passengers. Third class was finally introduced to the Flying Dutchman in 1890.

In March 1891, a South Devon Railway Leopard class locomotive derailed in heavy snow while hauling the down Flying Dutchman near Camborne, an event known in Cornwall as the "Great Blizzard". Fortunately the coaches remained on the track and there were no serious injuries.

The last run of the Flying Dutchman, still broad gauge, was on 19 May 1892; the 11:45 from Paddington the following day was a standard gauge express train, but not distinguished by any name.
