= Szlumper =

Szlumper is a surname. Notable people with the surname include:

- Alfred W. Szlumper (1858–1934), British railway engineer
- Gilbert Szlumper (1884–1969), British railwayman, son of Alfred
- James Szlumper (1834–1926), English civil engineer
