= John Elliot (railway manager) =

British railway manager (1898–1988)

Sir John Elliot
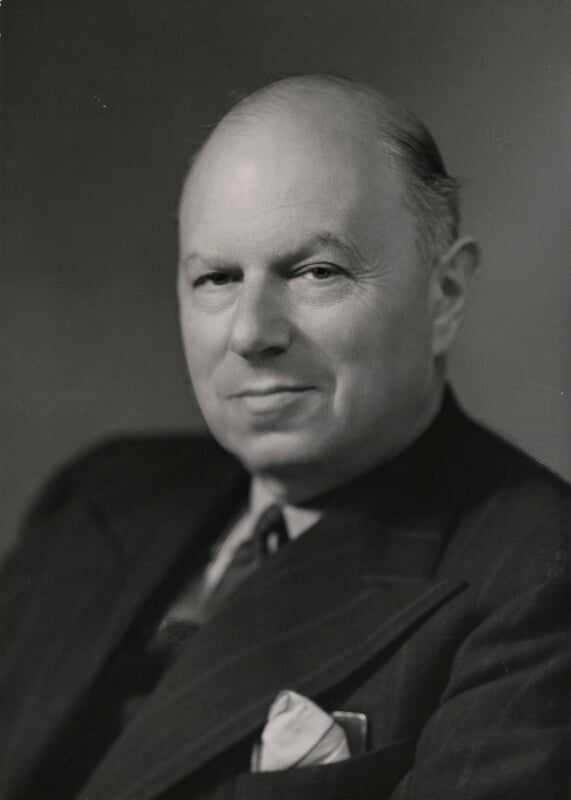
- Elliot in 1953
- Born: 6 May 1898
- Died: 18 September 1988 (aged 90)
- Occupations: Railway manager, author, journalist
- Years active: 1925–1969

Sir John Elliot (6 May 1898 – 18 September 1988) was a British journalist and transport and railway manager. Born John Elliot Blumenfeld, he was the son of the Daily Mail news editor R. D. Blumenfeld (who later became managing editor of the Daily Express.) He changed his surname to Elliot (his mother's surname) in March 1923 on the advice of Lord Beaverbrook.

== Biography ==
=== Early career ===
Elliot was educated at Marlborough School. He joined the Royal Military Academy Sandhurst where he trained as an officer in the years immediately before the First World War. During the War, he served as an officer in France, in the 3rd The King's Own Hussars, before following his father into journalism. He spent three years in New York, and then returned to London to become the assistant editor of the Evening Standard from 1922 to 1925.

=== Railway career ===
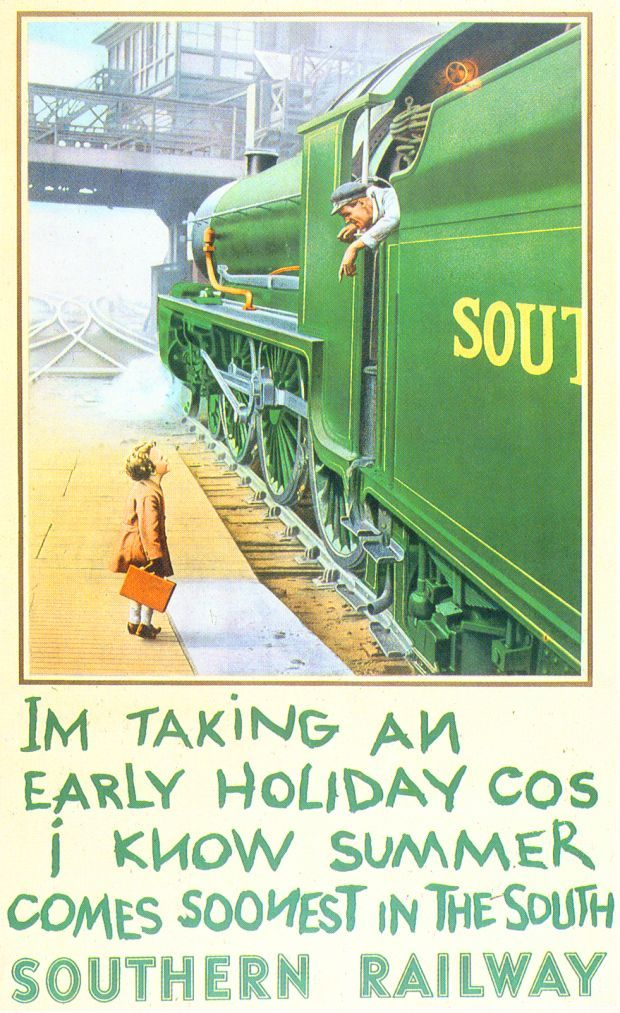
Southern Railway poster produced under Elliot's direction

In 1925, Elliot joined the Southern Railway as public relations assistant to the General Manager Sir Herbert Walker. Under Elliot's leadership, the Southern Railway became noted for the simple, direct messages in its publicity posters. One in particular, showing a small boy talking to the driver of a King Arthur 4-6-0 at Waterloo became internationally famous. The naming of this class of locomotive after characters from Arthurian legend was "in itself a master stroke of publicity".

In 1930, Elliot became assistant traffic manager for the railway, and in 1938 was appointed assistant general manager to Gilbert Szlumper. Shortly after the Second World War he became acting General Manager when his predecessor, Sir Eustace Missenden, was appointed to the Railway Executive. In late 1948, the Southern Railway was nationalised, with the rest of the railway system, into British Railways. Elliot took the role of Chief Regional Officer of the Southern region of the nationalised company and later the London Midland region. In 1951, he became Chairman of the Railway Executive. Elliot spent much of 1949 in Australia, reporting on the Victorian Railways system, he recommended a significant re-equipment of their system, which they started in 1950.

Elliot was appointed as Chairman of London Transport in 1953, a post he held until 1959. He was an early proponent of the building of the Victoria line and oversaw the trial tunneling work for it in the late 1950s, though the line did not open until many years after he left London Transport.

In October 1937 he was appointed Lieutenant-Colonel in the Engineer and Railway Staff Corps, and was promoted to full Colonel in May 1951. He commanded the unit from January 1956 until he was retired due to his age on 7 May 1963. He resigned his commission in December 1973. He was the president of the Railway Study Association in 1950–51.

=== After the railways ===
After leaving British Railways, Elliot became Chairman of Thomas Cook & Son Ltd, a post he held from 1959 until 1967. He received a knighthood in the 1954 New Years honours list. From 1965 to 1969, he was a director of the British Airports Authority.

In 1965, Eliott wrote a postscript to Alan Wood's work The True History of Lord Beaverbrook, published by Heinemann after both Beaverbrook and Wood had died. Even then, some parts of the book were suppressed.

Elliot's autobiography, On and Off the Rails, was published by George Allen & Unwin in 1982. He was also noted for his writing about the French Revolution and the First World War.

== Family ==
Elliot's son, David, was born in 1927. He was an enthusiastic railway photographer, capturing the last days of the Talyllyn Railway before it was preserved. David later became the Academic Registrar of Trinity College of Music during the 1970s and 1980s. In 1986, David hosted a BBC Radio 3 radio program, claiming that the composer Anton Bruckner was influenced by a love of railways; this spoof program brought together David's love of music and railways.

== Works ==
- Elliot, Sir John (November 1960). "Early Days of the Southern Railway". The Journal of Transport History. IV (4).
- Elliot, Sir John (29 April 1956). Why should we mind what the public think?. The Institute of Public Relations Seventh Annual Conference. Margate.
- Elliot, John (1958). The Story of the French Revolution as seen in Paris Today. New York: Reynal and Company.
- Elliot, John (1958). The way of the tumbrils: Paris during the Revolution and today. New York: Reynal and Company.

Business positions
Preceded by Eustace Missenden as General Manager	Acting General Manager, Southern Railway; 1947	Company nationalised
Preceded by Eustace Missenden	Chairman, Railway Executive; 1951–1953	Railway Executive abolished
Preceded by Lord Latham	Chairman, London Transport Executive; 1953–1959	Succeeded by Sir Alexander Valentine
Military offices
Preceded by Col. V. A. M. Robertson	Officer Commanding, Engineer and Railway Staff Corps; January 1956 – May 1963	Succeeded by Col. Alexander Valentine
