= Charles Owens =

Charles Owens may refer to:

- Charles Owens (golfer), American golfer
- Charles Owens (tennis), American tennis player
- Charles Owens (musician) (born 1939), American jazz saxophonist and flautist
- Charles John Owens, British railway manager
- Charles L. Owens, first African-American judge in Oklahoma
- Tinker Owens (Charles Wayne Owens), American football player

== See also ==
- Charlie Owens (disambiguation)
