= Eustace Missenden =

British railwayman

Sir Eustace Missenden OBE
- Born: Eustace James Missenden; 3 March 1886; London, England
- Died: 30 January 1973 (aged 86); Rudgwick, Sussex, England
- Occupation: Railwayman

Sir Eustace James Missenden OBE (3 March 1886 – 30 January 1973) was a British railwayman, successively the last General Manager of the Southern Railway and the first Chairman of the Railway Executive.

== Early life ==
Eustace James Missenden was born in London, the son of a South Eastern and Chatham Railway station master. He left school at an early age, which, according to author Michael Bonavia, gave him a chip on his shoulder.

In May 1899, Missenden started work as a junior clerk with the South Eastern Railway, at the small station at Bishopsbourne, on the Elham Valley line, earning 7 s a week. In November 1902, after a spell at New Romney, he was posted to Lydd, on the edge of Romney Marsh, and his pay went up to 17s a week. For a staff photograph, which must have been taken shortly after he arrived (aged sixteen and a half), he stood at the extreme edge of the group, as befitted his junior status, but his shiny shoes and stand-up collar (the only one in the group) show that he intended to make an impression.

== Southern Railway years ==
Missenden's career was largely with the Southern Railway, where he rose to be Docks and Marine Manager and in 1941 General Manager. He was a competent railwayman, experienced more on the operating than the commercial side of operations, and was loyal to the established working practices of the Southern Railway. Missenden was also a good organiser and knew how to delegate, whilst looking after the interests of those subordinates who had served him well, the key example being Oliver Bulleid. He firmly declined to work over-long hours and was careful, perhaps even fussy, over his health. However, Missenden lacked both the warm, extrovert personality of his predecessor at Waterloo, Gilbert S. Szlumper, and the intellectual and managerial distinction of Sir Herbert Walker, a predecessor he admired greatly.

== Railway executive years ==
With the passing of the Transport Act 1947, Missenden became the first Chairman of the Railway Executive later that year, accountable to the British Transport Commission for the running of British Railways.

Missenden accepted the offer of the Chairmanship, though with the private intention of "retiring before too long". This was primarily because he did not move easily in Government circles, being suspicious of both politicians and civil servants. He found himself out of his depth in attempting to coordinate a team of disparate Railway Executive Members who were not responsible to him in the way that railway departmental officers had been responsible to a General Manager. The difficulties came from the fact that the Members represented the legacy of the "Big Four" railway companies in Britain, with each having their own agenda even when part of a nationalised industry. Antipathy increased when the Southern Railway, the smallest of Britain's pre-nationalised railways, had provided the Chairman, and as such, the Railway Executive ceased to be an effective body for policy-making.

In 1949, British Railways gave Bulleid Pacific locomotive 34090 the name Sir Eustace Missenden - Southern Railway. The intention was both to honour his personal contribution and to act as a tribute to the war effort of the Southern Railway's employees.

Missenden retired in 1951.

== Honours ==
He was appointed a Member of the Order of the British Empire (MBE) in 1925 and upgraded to Officer of the same order (OBE) in the 1937 Coronation Honours. He was knighted in the 1944 Birthday Honours.

== Personal life ==
In 1912, he married Lilian Adeline Gent, daughter of Henry Gent. They had no children.

He died in 1973, aged 86.

Business positions
Preceded by Gilbert S. Szlumper	General Manager of the Southern Railway; 1941–1947	Succeeded by John Elliot as Acting General Manager
First	Chairman of the Railway Executive; 1947–1951	Succeeded by John Elliot
