= Charlie Owens =

Charlie Owens may refer to:

- Charlie Owens (artist), mixed-media artist
- Charlie Owens (footballer) (born 1997), Northern Irish footballer
- Charles Owens (tennis) (born 1950), American tennis player
