= Railway Executive Committee =

The Railway Executive Committee (REC) was a government body which controlled the operation of Britain's railways during World War I and World War II. It should not be confused with the Railway Executive which was a division of the British Transport Commission.

In both cases, this period of government control was followed by a major re-organisation of the railways.

== World War I ==
The Railway Executive Committee (REC) was formed in 1912 to act as an intermediary between the War Office and the various British railway companies. It was formed in response to the Agadir Crisis for a contingency in which it would have to defend its Triple Entente partners France and Russia against a Triple Alliance offensive. The companies were already involved in the transport of many thousands of troops during annual manoeuvres and it was realised that better coordination and planning would be required if the United Kingdom were to enter into a future European war. In 1911, the companies began to plan for the movement of troops, horses and equipment to the embarkation ports, chiefly Southampton, in case of mobilisation; the main role of the REC was to oversee this work. When completed, the orders for this complicated plan that were issued to the various railways were known as the "War Book".

Using powers granted to the government by the Regulation of the Forces Act 1871, the REC took control of the national rail network on 4 August 1914, the day that war was declared and mobilisation began. Alexander Kaye Butterworth was appointed chairman. REC control lasted from 1914 to 1921. It was followed by the Railways Act 1921 which led to the creation of the Big Four British railway companies in 1923. Herbert Ashcombe Walker was acting chairman of the REC in January 1917.

== World War II ==
=== Preparation ===
The REC was re-formed on 24 September 1938 with a remit to run the British railways if war broke out. The railways would later be brought under government control through the REC under the direction of the Ministry of Transport.

The Big Four railway companies, comprising the Great Western Railway (GWR), the London, Midland and Scottish Railway (LMS), the London and North Eastern Railway (LNER), and the Southern Railway (SR), along with the London Passenger Transport Board (LPTB) were initially represented by Sir Ralph Wedgwood (chairman) for LNER, Sir James Milne (deputy chairman) for GWR, Sir William Wood for LMS, Gilbert Szlumper for SR, and Frank Pick for LTPB. The secretary of the committee was G. Cole Deacon from the Railway Companies' Association.

Initially, the role of the REC was advisory and coordinated the existing emergency plans and preparations of the railway companies and the Railway Technical Committee for such matters as civilian evacuation and air raid precautions.

At first, the offices of the REC were at Fielden House in Westminster. Unlike the railway companies, which were planning to move their headquarters out of London, the REC remained in London to stay in close contact with the government. The basement in Fielden House was unsuitable, so the unused Down Street tube station was converted into bomb-proof underground offices to become the headquarters of REC. The only available space was on the platforms, but Piccadilly Line trains still passed through the station. Under great secrecy, new walls were built at night when the trains had stopped running. The doors to the new headquarters were fitted with gas locks, and short, secret, platforms were added, where REC members and senior staff could stop a train and travel in the cab to the next station. The new headquarters included offices, dormitories (with space for 12 senior officials and 22 members of staff), kitchens, and mess rooms.

=== Outbreak of war ===
The Minister of Transport, Euan Wallace, took control of the railways on 1 September 1939 (two days before Britain declared war on Germany). Control was taken using the Railway Control Order 1939 under the powers granted by Defence Regulation 69 created under the Emergency Powers (Defence) Act 1939.

The companies affected included the Big Four (and any joint companies operated by them), LPTB, East Kent Railway, Kent and East Sussex Railway, King's Lynn Docks and Railway Company, Mersey Railway, and Shropshire and Montgomery Railway.

To save money on fuel and reduce the demands on the railways the REC ordered various restrictions on passenger services which came into effect on 11 September 1939: passenger train services were reduced in number and speeds were restricted; various reduced fares were discontinued; reservations of seats, compartments, and saloons were discontinued; restaurant car services were withdrawn; and the number of sleeping car services was reduced.

REC control lasted from 1939 until the railways were nationalised in 1948.

=== Publicity ===
Some of the cartoons of Carl Giles were reprinted in poster form for World War II Railway Executive Committee.

== See also ==
- Railway Operating Division

== Sources ==
- Bryan, Tim (1995). The Great Western at War 1939-1945 (1 ed.). Yeovil, Somerset, UK: Patrick Stephens. ISBN 1-85260-479-4. OCLC 60238810.
- Maggs, Colin (2013). A History of the Great Western Railway (1 ed.). Stroud, Gloucestershire, UK: Amberley Publishing. ISBN 978-1-4456-1277-5. OCLC 855536026.
- Semmens, Peter (1985). A History of the Great Western Railway: 3. Wartime and the Final Years 1939-48. @Steam past (1 ed.). London: Guild Publishing. ISBN 978-0-043-85106-7. OCLC 786175335.
- Williams, Michael (2013). Steaming to Victory: How Britain's Railways Won the War (1 ed.). London: Preface Publishing. ISBN 978-1-848-09314-0. OCLC 826659802.
- Wragg, David (2006). Wartime on the Railways (1 ed.). Stroud, Gloucestershire: Sutton Publishing. ISBN 978-0750-94246-1. OCLC 70230104.
