= Alfred W. Szlumper =

British railway engineer

Alfred Weeks Szlumper CBE
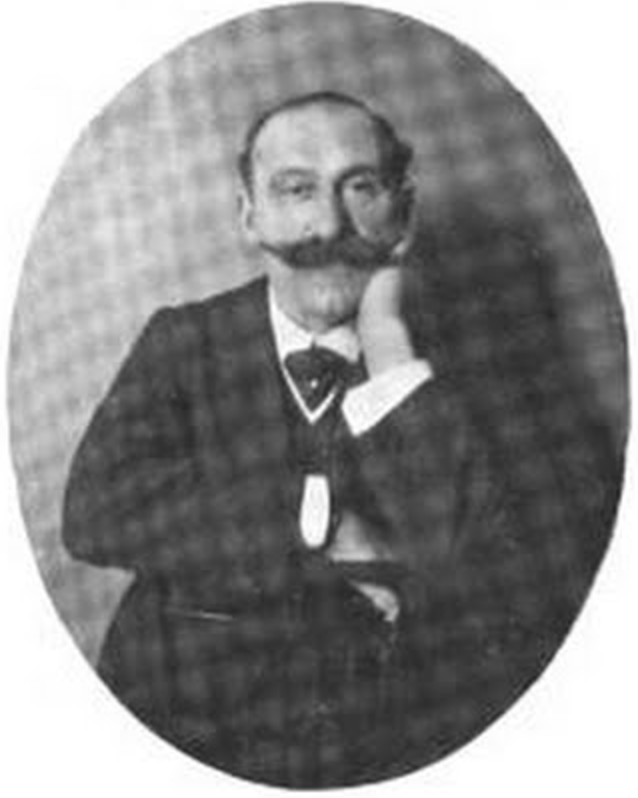
- Portrait of Alfred Weeks Szlumper, taken around 1909
- Born: 24 May 1858; Milford, Pembrokeshire, England
- Died: 11 November 1934 (aged 76)
- Occupations: Civil engineer, Railway engineer
- Years active: 1880–1927

Alfred Weeks Szlumper CBE (24 May 1858 – 11 November 1934), was a British railway engineer. He was the president of the Permanent Way Institution and the chief engineer of the London and South Western Railway and later the Southern Railway company.

== Biography ==
=== Early life ===
Szlumper was born in Milford, Pembrokeshire, on 24 May 1858, the son of Albert Szlumper, a Polish tailor, and his second wife, Sally Harris. He had an older brother of the same name who died in 1856. After attending the University of Wales, he served as apprentice to his older half-brother, Sir James Szlumper who was also a noted railway engineer.

=== Early career ===
In 1880, Szlumper was appointed as engineering assistant on the South Eastern Railway. He served for two years before moving to the Great Indian Peninsula Railway as a resident engineer.

=== London and South Western Railway ===
In 1884, he took a position as engineering assistant on the London and South Western Railway. He led a series of projects to widen the main line in London and in the Woking-Basingstoke area. During this work he was promoted to resident engineer. In 1892 he presented a paper to the Institution of Civil Engineers on his work reconstructing Vauxhall station. In 1897 he was promoted again to divisional engineer for London and in 1914 he became chief engineer of the railway, replacing John Wykeham Jacomb-Hood. He oversaw the building of the Bordon Light Railway in 1902, the remodelling of Clapham Junction station which was carrying over 1,000 trains a day, and the first electrification scheme carried out by the L&SWR between 1913 and 1916. He also completed the major reconstruction of Waterloo station in 1914–15.

During the First World War, Szlumper also worked for the War Office and the Admiralty. In 1920 he was made a CBE. In 1922 he was elected president of the Permanent Way Institution.

=== Southern Railway ===
In 1924, the London & South Western Railway became part of the larger Southern Railway, and Szlumper retained the post of chief engineer in the larger company. He oversaw the reconstructions of the Barnes, Kingston and Richmond bridges and the Feltham goods yard.

=== Retirement ===
Szlumper retired in June 1927. During his career he was awarded the Miller Prize, the Trevithick and Telford Premiums by the Institute of Civil Engineers. He also won the Telford Medal for his description of the "Widening and Improvement Works London and South Western Railway Metropolitan Extension". He died on 11 November 1934 in Richmond.

=== Family ===
His son, Gilbert Szlumper became the assistant general manager of the Southern Railway in 1925, and became general manager in 1934.
