= Herbert Ashcombe Walker =

British railway manager (1868–1949)

Sir Herbert Ashcombe Walker KCB
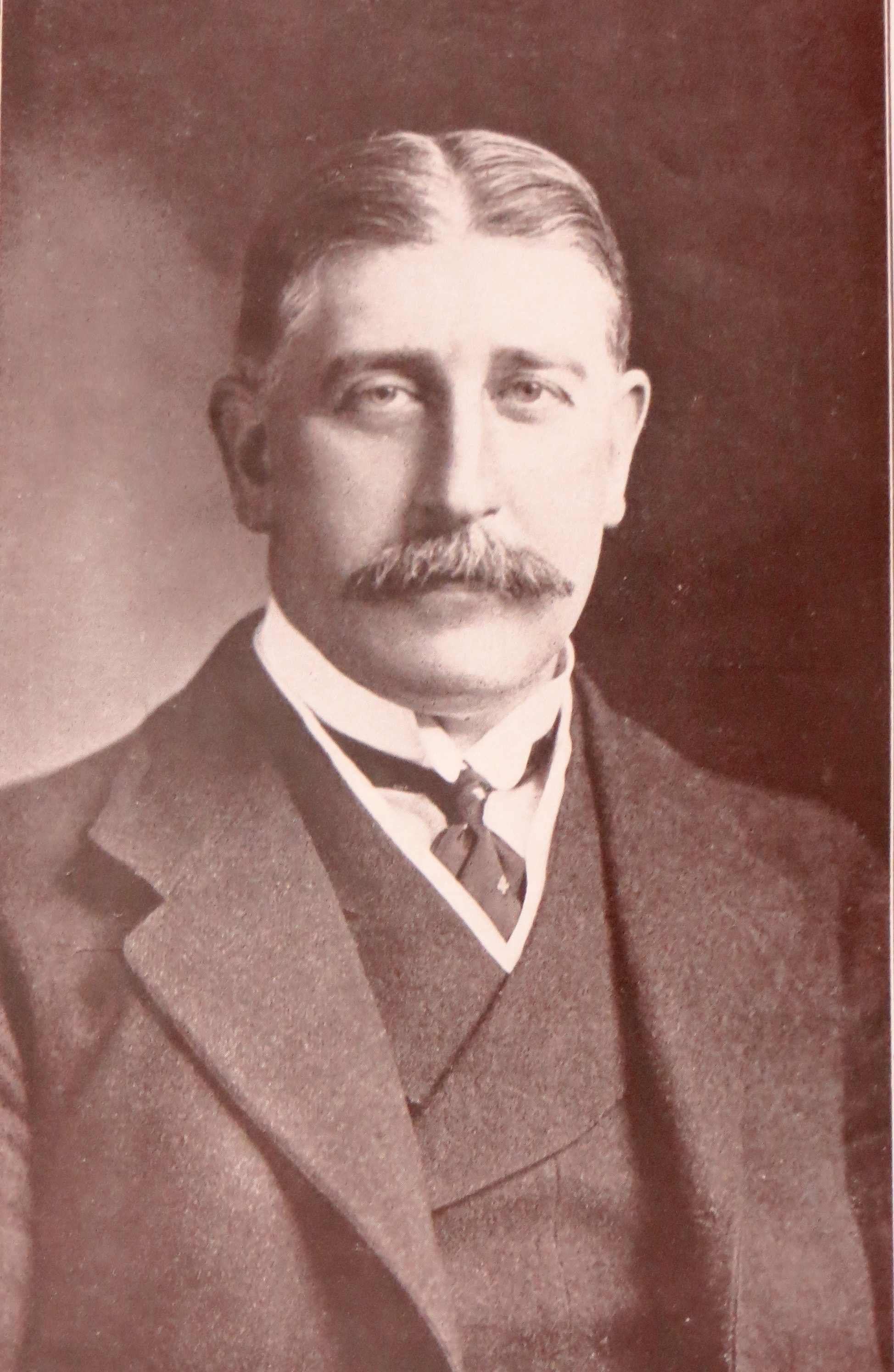
- Ashcombe in the 1915 edition of The Railway Magazine, photographed by Elliott & Fry
- Born: 16 May 1868; Paddington, London, England
- Died: September 29, 1949 (aged 81); Hampstead, North London, England
- Occupation: Railway manager

Sir Herbert Ashcombe Walker KCB (16 May 1868 – 29 September 1949) was a British railway manager.

== Early life ==
Walker was born in Paddington, London, on 16 May 1868, the son of a doctor. He was educated at the North London Collegiate School and studied medicine for one year at St Francis Xavier College, Bruges. He then passed the Apothecaries' Hall exam.

== Career ==
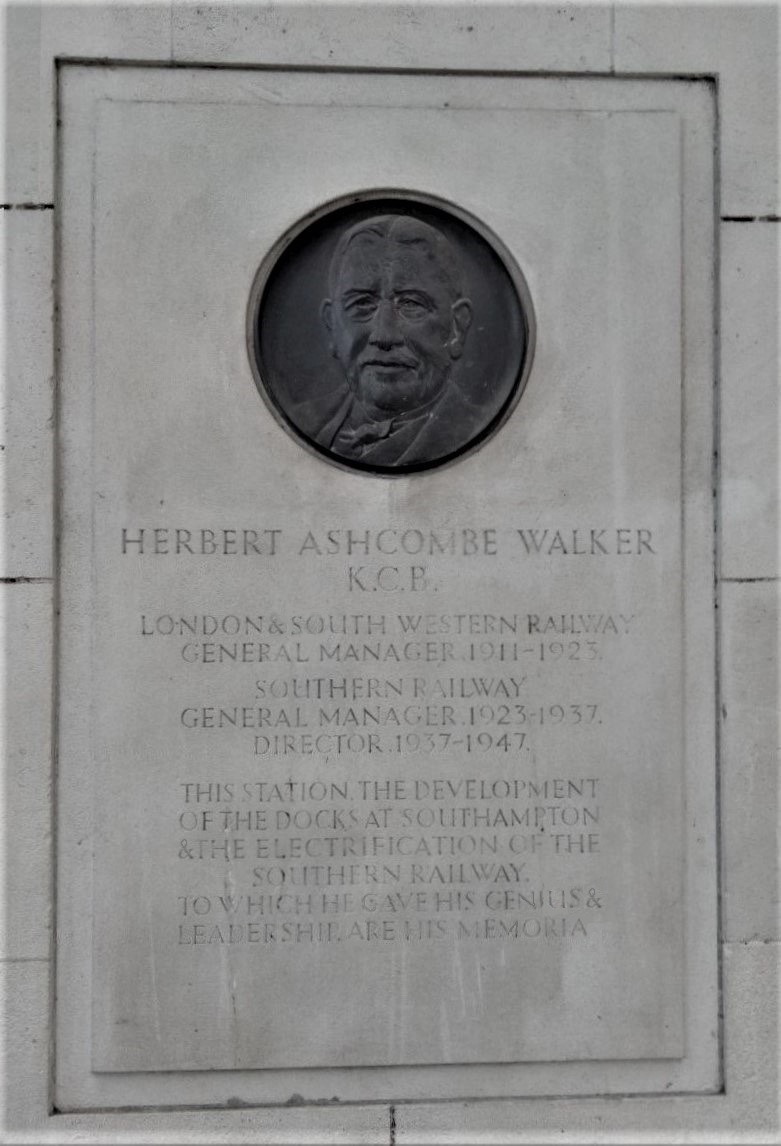
Sir Herbert Walker Memorial plaque, Waterloo Station

When family finances meant that plans for a medical career had to be abandoned, Walker, aged 17, joined the London and North Western Railway (LNWR) as a clerk at Euston in April 1885. In January 1889 he became outdoor assistant to the Superintendent of the Line. In 1893 he was made Assistant District Superintendent, North Wales Division and 10 months later was moved to the same job in the Southern Division (covering London to Stafford); in 1902 he became District Superintendent Euston, when he visited the US to study American practice. In October 1909, he became Assistant to the Superintendent of the Line and in July 1910 Outdoor Goods Manager for the southern half of the LNWR. In 1911 he became Assistant to the General Manager, Sir Frank Ree.

From 1 January 1912, he became General Manager of the London and South Western Railway, where he instigated the programme of third-rail electrification. He received a knighthood in March 1915. By January 1917, he was acting chairman of the Railway Executive Committee, for which he was made a Knight Commander of the Order of the Bath (KCB).

After a frustrating year of indecision on the part of the Southern Railway's Board, he was appointed General Manager there in 1923, where he encouraged the electrification programme and was a major influence on locomotive development on the Southern Railway. On his retirement in 1937, he served as a Director of the Southern Railway until the end of its existence in 1947.

In addition to his two knighthoods, Walker was a lieutenant of the City of London, Knight of Grace of the Order of Saint John and a Grand Officer of the French Legion of Honour. He served in the Engineer and Railway Staff Corps, retiring as a Colonel.

== Personal life ==
In 1894 Walker married Ethel Louisa Griffith. After her death in 1909, he married Lorina Elizabeth Shield in 1910. There were no children from either marriage. Walker died on 29 September 1949 at his home in Hampstead, North London.

== Character ==
Walker was physically well made, having stamina and a commanding presence. He looked what he was, a man who knew his job and meant to do it and had a remarkable memory. There is a memorial to him, including a stone cameo portrait, set in the stonework at Waterloo station, commemorating his involvement in the rebuilding of the station, completed in 1922 and the electrification of the Southern Railway. He was a strong advocate of the Channel Tunnel.

Business positions
Preceded by Sir Charles Owens	General Manager of the London and South Western Railway; 1912–1922	Company merged into the Southern Railway
First	General Manager of the Southern Railway; 1924–1937	Succeeded by Gilbert S. Szlumper
