= Gilbert Szlumper =

British railwayman and soldier (1884–1969)

Major General Gilbert Szlumper CBE, TD
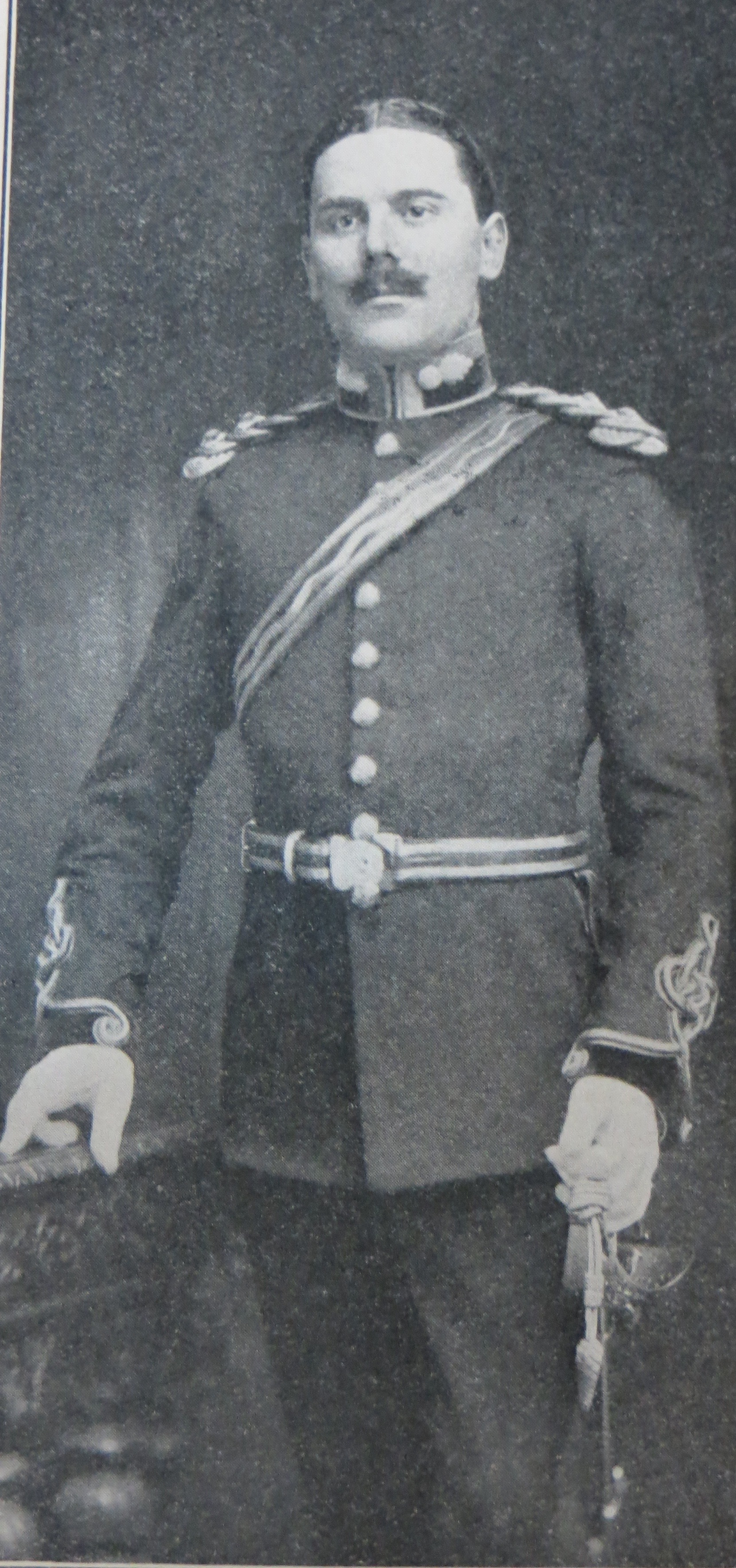
- Szlumper in the July 1915 edition of The Railway Magazine, photographed by Elliott & Fry
- Born: Gilbert Savil Szlumper; 18 April 1884
- Died: 19 July 1969 (aged 85)
- Occupations: Railwayman; soldier
- Father: Alfred W. Szlumper

Major General Gilbert Savil Szlumper, CBE, TD (18 April 1884 – 19 July 1969) was a British railwayman, and the penultimate general manager of the Southern Railway. He served as secretary of the Railway Executive Committee in World War I and left the Southern Railway for war service again in 1939, serving in a number of senior transport positions in various government departments.

== Early life and LSWR ==
Gilbert Szlumper was born at Kew, London, on 18 April 1884, the son of Alfred W. Szlumper, later chief engineer of the London and South Western Railway (LSWR). He was educated at King's College School, Wimbledon, and studied engineering for two years at King's College London and three years under the LSWR's chief engineer, John Wykeham Jacomb-Hood. He then acted as resident engineer on a number of projects, including the LSWR electrification programme. In February 1914 he was appointed assistant to the LSWR's general manager, Herbert Walker.

== Military career ==
On 1 December 1908 Gilbert Szlumper was commissioned into the part-time Territorial Force (TF) as a Second lieutenant in the Chatham Electric Light Company of the Kent Fortress Royal Engineers. He was promoted to Lieutenant on 1 April 1910 and on 17 December that year he transferred to the Eastleigh-based No 3 (Works) Company of the Hampshire Fortress Royal Engineers after the LSWR appointed him assistant divisional engineer at Eastleigh Works. He was serving with this unit on the outbreak of World War I, but was seconded as a railway transport officer, graded as a Staff Captain, with effect from 31 July 1914, helping to oversee the despatch of the British Expeditionary Force to France from the LSWR's Southampton Docks. Walker (later Sir Herbert Walker) was acting chairman of the Railway Executive Committee, tasked with organising Britain's railways for the war effort and Szlumper was secretary to this committee throughout the war. On 1 January 1916 Szlumper was promoted to Major in the Engineer and Railway Staff Corps (ERSC), an officer-only TF unit of the Royal Engineers in which his father and Sir Herbert Walker had both served before the war.

After the war he remained in the ERSC, was awarded the Territorial Decoration (TD) on 12 October 1921 and was promoted to Lieutenant-Colonel on 18 April 1928. He retired from the Territorial Army on 18 December 1929.

== Southern Railway ==
In 1919 Szlumper returned to work for the LSWR as deputy docks and marine officer at Southampton Docks, succeeding as dock and marine officer in 1923. In 1923 the LSWR was grouped as part of the new Southern Railway, with Sir Herbert Walker as general manager. Szlumper was appointed assistant general manager in 1925, and in 1937 succeeded Walker as general manager of the Southern.

In 1937 he returned to the ESRC with the rank of Colonel. and shortly after the outbreak of World War II it was announced that he was to be specially employed and was given the acting rank of Major-General, serving as director-general of transportation and movement at the War Office. During his absence from the Southern he was ousted from the general managership in 1941 by Eustace Missenden who had refused to take up position as acting general manager in anticipation of Szlumper's return in peacetime. In 1940–41 Szlumper was railway control officer with the Ministry of Transport, and in 1942 became director-general of supply services at the Ministry of Supply. He retired again from the TA on 1 January 1943 having reached the age limit, and was granted the honorary rank of Major-General, but continued at the Ministry of Supply. In 1944–45 he was loaned to the South African government to advise on railway and port problems. After the war he became a member of the Air Transport Advisory Committee of the Ministry of Civil Aviation in 1949.

== Honours ==
Szlumper was awarded a Civil CBE for his railway work on 2 July 1925. He was also a Lieutenant of the City of London, a Knight of St John, an officer of the Legion of Honour, and a commander of the Order of Leopold II.

Business positions
| Preceded by Sir Herbert Walker | General Manager of the Southern Railway; 1937–1939 | Succeeded by Eustace Missenden |
