= Charlie Owens (artist) =

American mixed-media artist

Charlie Owens is a mixed-media artist currently residing in Atlanta, Georgia, United States. His work has been featured in many exhibits and galleries across the United States, as well as being seen on television, in print, and in other media outlets. Many of his compositions include a variety of both imagery and techniques, including screen printing, stenciling, airbrush, burning, attachment, assemblage, aging, distressing, and acrylic painting, among others. His style is notable for its frequent use of cartoon figures (often in the style of early 20th century pin-up art), pop culture references, juxtaposition, and cult phenomenon imagery.

== Notable work and exhibits ==
Apr, 3rd. 09. Atlanta, GA. Alcove Gallery. "Fools Gold"

Nov, 1st. 2008. Columbus, OH. Rivet Art Gallery.

Oct, 24th. 2008. Chicago, IL. Burger King Studio. "Have It Your Way"

Oct, 11th. 2008. Chicago, IL. OhNo!Doom. "We Need Each Other"

Sept, 20th. 2008. Atlanta, GA. Eastside Lounge. "The Hurt Show"

May, 9th. 2008. Chicago, IL. Clothes Optional. "Owl Kind of Town"

Apr, 26th. 2008. Atlanta, GA. Foundation1. "Groundwork II"

Apr, 19th. 2008. Asbury Park, NJ. Crybaby Gallery, "It Could Be Worse"

Mar, 15th. 2008. Atlanta, GA. The Rabbit-Hole. "Sons of the South2"

Feb, 1st. 2008. Atlanta, GA. Beep Beep Gallery. "Nostalgia"

Jan, 19th. 2008. Atlanta, GA. Eastside Lounge. "Skull Fuck 2"

Dec, 14th. 2007. Atlanta, GA. Eastside Lounge. "Sons of the South"

Dec, 1st. 2007. Atlanta, GA. Young Blood. "Seasons"

Dec, 1st. 2007. Mesa, AZ. WindUp Gallery. "Sk8Deck the Halls"

Sept, 7th. 2007. Chicago, IL. Clothes Optional, "Southern Comfort"

Apr, 27th. 2007. Atlanta, GA. Alcove Gallery. "Cartoon Madness 2"

Mar, 17th. 2007. Atlanta, GA. Foundation1. "Between the Lines"

Dec, 8th. 2006. Atlanta, GA. Alcove Gallery. "Tiki Holiday"

June, 2006. Atlanta, GA. The Rabbit-Hole. "Punk vs Metal"

Owens is also noted for his work in the graphic design field, having done design work for various departments within the Turner Broadcasting family as well as working on album art for many musicians, including BoneCrusher, DaBrat, Infernal Machine, Devil May Care, SoSo Def, Collective Soul, Supafuzz, and Hermano.
