= Charles John Owens =

British railway manager

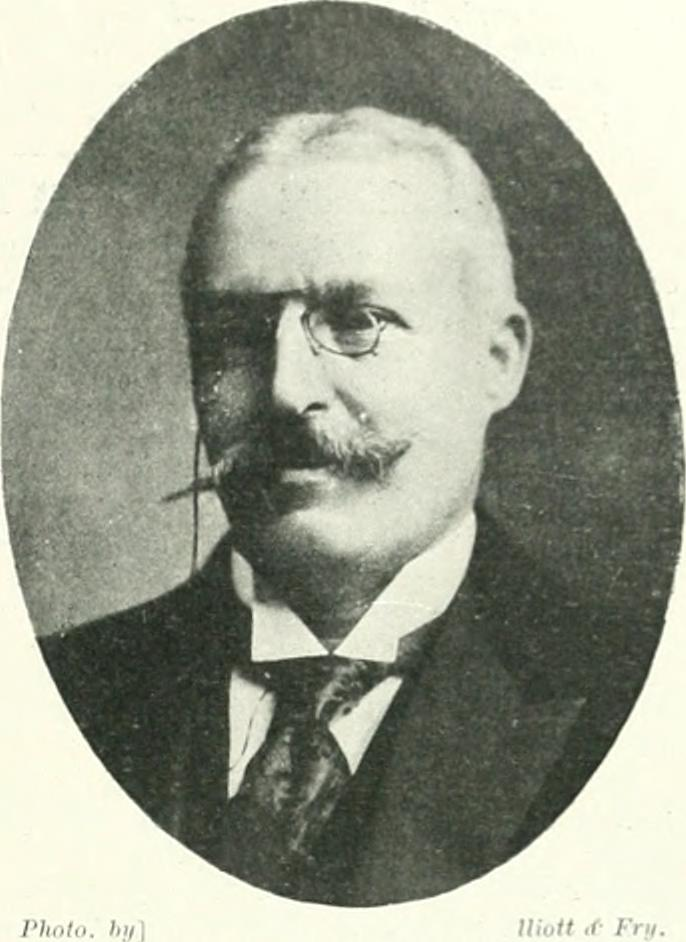
Sir Charles J. Owens as he appeared in 1910

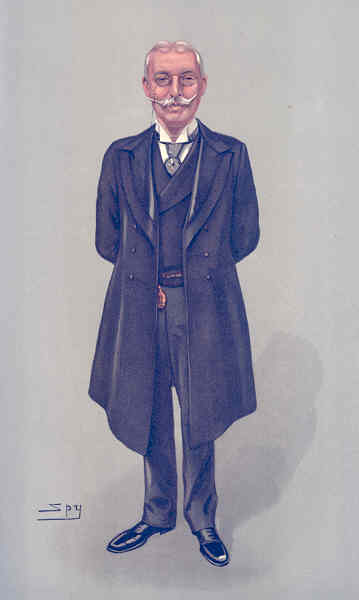
Portrait in Vanity Fair, 19 March 1903

Sir Charles John Owens, CB (26 September 1845 – 17 January 1933) was a British railway manager.

== Biography ==
Charles John Owens was born on 26 September 1845. Entering the service of the London and South Western Railway when he was 17, he rose to be its general manager from 1898 to 1912, and a director from 1912 to 1923. From 1923 to 1930 he was a director of the Southern Railway.

Owens was a member of the Commission of Lieutenancy of the City of London, a member of the Royal Commission on Imperial Free Trade, and the chairman of the British and Foreign Bible Society.

Owens was knighted on 18 December 1902, and appointed a Companion of the Order of the Bath (CB) in 1917.

He died at his home in Putney on 17 January 1933, and was buried at Putney Vale Cemetery.
