= Thomas Isaac Allen =

Thomas Isaac Allen (1841–1911) was superintendent of the line of the Great Western Railway from 1894 to 1903.

== Life ==
He was born in London on 4 February 1841, the son of Thomas Allen (1814-1878) and Ann Bevill Isaac (1822-1902). He married Margaret Sophia Carlyle (1847-1933), daughter of Revd. Benjamin Fearnley Carlyle (1808-1869) and Margaret Harris Fisher (1809-1894) on 17 July 1869 in St James’ Church, West Teignmouth, and had the following children:

- Thomas Fearnley Allen (1870-1957)
- Margaret Annie Allen (1875-1943)
- Arthur Denys Allen (1876-1960)
- Mary Sophia Allen OBE (1878-1964)
- Herbert Charles Allen (1879-1919)
- Elsie Allen (1882-1929)
- Janet Bevill Allen (1883-1945)
- Alice Christine Allen (1886-1972)
- Edward Carlyle Allen (1890-1968)

He died on 20 December 1911 in Brighton and left an estate valued at £2254 (equivalent to £289,900 in 2023).

== Career ==
He entered the service of the Great Western Railway in September 1856 as a clerk in the Office of the Superintendent of the London Division, George Nugent Tyrrell at Paddington. In July 1859 he was in charge of the Timetable and Excursion Departments. In October 1863 he was promoted to chief clerk to James Kelley, and in 1865 chief assistant to George Tyrrell on his appointment as first superintendent of the line. In 1870 he was promoted to superintendent of the Newport Division and subsequently Cardiff.

During his time at Cardiff, he was occupied with the absorption of the Llynvi and Ogmore Railway and the Monmouthshire Railway and Canal Company, and the conversion of his section of the railway from broad gauge to standard gauge. The gauge conversion in the Newport area was the first major project undertaken by the company. The plan devised divided the line into sections. The up line was narrowed first whilst the down was worked as a single line with crossing places, this provided a reduced services but without stopping the railway. All of the stock was finally transferred to the remaining broad gauge line and sent to Swindon, making sure that nothing was left behind in the general retreat. The standard gauge up line was then worked as a single line with passing places, allowing the remaining broad gauge down line to be converted.

For many years the Swindon Refreshment Room contract required every train except for a mail train to stop at the station for ten minutes. Mr Allen found a way for the company to amend its contract with the Refreshment Room which resulted in trains being able to run non-stop through the station and from 1889 to 1903, the number of fast or express trains out of Paddington doubled in number, improving journey times.

In 1888 he became assistant superintendent of the line at Paddington. After a brief period from 1891 to 1894 when was assistant general manager, he succeeded Nathan Burlinson as superintendent of the line.

He retired in December 1903.

Professional and academic associations
| Preceded by Nathan James Burlinson | Superintendent of the Line of the Great Western Railway; 1894–1904 | Succeeded by Joseph Morris |
