= Spagnoletti =

Spagnoletti is a surname. Notable people with the surname include:

- Charles Spagnoletti (1832–1915), British inventor
- Robert Spagnoletti, American jurist
