= Joseph Morris (railway manager) =

British railway manager (1845–1928)

Lieutenant-Colonel Joseph Morris MVO VD (1845–1928) was superintendent of the line of the Great Western Railway from 1904 to 1910.

== Life ==
He was born at Whittington, Shropshire on 7 March 1845, the son of Joseph Morris (1798–1881) and Ann Williams (1809–1883). He married Elizabeth Robertson (1835–1930) in 1867 and they had the following children:

- Francis Elizabeth Ann Morris (1868–1963)
- Edith Alice Mary Morris (1870–1925)
- Joseph Robertson Morris (1872–1940)
- Samuel Frederick Arthur Morris (1875–1942)
- Edwin Whittington Moris (1876–1950)
- Walsham Roberton Scott Morris (1881–1973)

He died on 15 February 1928 at Crieve House, 15 Montpellier Road, Ealing, London and left an estate valued at £22,442 (equivalent to £1,219,000 in 2025).

== Military career ==
He was a volunteer in the Earl of Chester’s Rifles at Chester as a private from March 1867 to May 1870. He joined as a second lieutenant in May 1878, became lieutenant in August 1880, captain from 1 January 1883, and promoted to honorary major in July 1893 retiring in May 1894.

In June 1904 he received a commission in the Engineer & Railway Volunteer Staff Corps, and was gazetted major and then promoted to honorary lieutenant colonel in July 1906. He resigned his commission on 31 December 1910 but retained permission to retain his rank and wear his uniform.

== Railway career ==
He entered the service of the Great Western Railway in August 1861 as a goods clerk at Oswestry and later was deputed to take relief clerks duty at various stations. In 1864 he was transferred to the Office of the Divisional Superintendent of the Northern Division at Chester. In 1870 he was promoted to be chief clerk in that division at Chester and in 1879 assistant divisional superintendent there. In 1891 he moved to be assistant superintendent of the line at Paddington where in 1904 he became superintendent of the line. He held this post until his retirement in December 1910.

Amongst his achievements as superintendent of the line were the introduction of the Cornish Riviera Express, which ran for the first time without any intermediate stop from London to Plymouth, the new direct route from London to High Wycombe in 1906, and the new line between Castle Cary and Langport, which shortened the distance between Paddington and the West of England, enabling an acceleration in services, the inauguration of the Fishguard to Rosslare shipping service in 1906, and the channel service from Plymouth to Brest in 1907, and the new route from Birmingham via Stratford-on-Avon to Cheltenham in 1908, and finally the opening of the new direct route to Birmingham via Bicester. He was also responsible for the railway arrangements for the Funeral of King Edward VII.

In December 1904 he was made a Knight of Nossa Senora da Conocia de Vila Viçosa by the king of Portugal on the occasion of his Majesty’s visit to England. In July 1906 he was awarded the Volunteer Officers' Decoration for Long Service. On 30 November 1907 the emperor of Germany awarded him the Order of the Red Eagle.

As assistant superintendent and superintendent of the line, he was responsible for the operation of several Royal Trains carrying both Queen Victoria, King Edward VII and King George V. For his service to members of the Royal Family, he was awarded the Member of the Royal Victorian Order on 21 December 1910 on the occasion of his official retirement.

Professional and academic associations
Preceded by Thomas Isaac Allen	Superintendent of the Line of the Great Western Railway; 1904–1910	Succeeded by Charles Adlington
