= William Lancaster Owen =

William Lancaster Owen MInstCE (8 November 1843 - 28 November 1911) was a British civil engineer primarily with the Great Western Railway.

== Career ==
In 1868 he took a commission as a First Lieutenant in the 1st Gloucestershire Engineer Volunteer Corps which he held until 29 October 1873.

He entered the service of the Great Western Railway as assistant engineer in 1865. In 1872 he was Engineer to the Monmouthshire Railway and Canal Company, but returned to the Great Western Railway in 1875 where he remained until retirement in 1891.

He was responsible for some important works on the Great Western Railway including the rebuilding of Newport railway station in 1878, Torquay railway station in 1878 and Penzance railway station in 1879, and also the conversion from broad gauge to standard gauge of the Hereford to Bristol line with J.W. Armstrong. Upon his father's retirement as Chief Engineer of the Great Western Railway in 1885, he took over responsibility for new engineering works.

He was elected an Associate of the Institute of Civil Engineers in 1874 and made a Member on 28 March 1882.

== Personal life ==
He was born at Bath on 8 November 1843, the son of William George Owen (1810-1885) (Chief Civil Engineer of the Great Western Railway 1868-1885) and Amelia Sarah Martin (1818 - 1896).

He married Helen Evans, second daughter of William Evans on 24 May 1871 at St Woollos Church and they had two children:

- William Cecil Owen (1872 - 1959)
- Helen Mary Lancaster Owen (1883 - 1941)

He lived in retirement at 26 Cornwall Gardens, London and died in 1911 aged 68 leaving an estate of £17,868 (equivalent to £1,819,700 in 2025).

Professional and academic associations
Preceded by William George Owen	Chief Engineer of the Great Western Railway; 1885–1891	Succeeded by Louis Trench
