= Nathan James Burlinson =

Nathan James Burlinson (1833–1916) was superintendent of the line of the Great Western Railway from 1888 to 1894.

== Life ==
He was born in London on 11 April 1833, the son of Captain Nathan Burlinson (died 1869) and Mary Ann Burlinson (died 1881). He married Charlotte Henrietta Cousins (1836–1881), daughter of Quartermaster W. Cousins of the Royal Military Asylum on 13 October 1855 in St Luke's Church, Chelsea and they had the following children:

- Henrietta Mary Burlinson (1857–1912)
- Nathan William Burlinson (born 1859)
- Constance Ann Burlinson (born 1860)
- Beatrice Edith Burlinson (born 1863)
- Albert Edward Burlinson (born 1865)
- Charlotte Eleanor Burlinson (born 1867)
- Kate Burlinson (born 1869)
- Henry Augustus Burlinson (born 1872)
- Reginald Burlinson (born 1874)
- Ada Burlinson (born 1876)
- Walter Burlinson (born 1879)

Charlotte Henrietta Burlinson died on 6 January 1881 at Montrose House, Uxbridge Road, Shepherd's Bush, London. He married secondly Augusta Ann Jane Ward (1844-1897) on 19 April 1883 in St John the Evangelist’s Church, Brixton and they had the following child:

- Alice Ward Burlinson (born 1885)

He died on 31 January 1916 and left an estate valued at £11653 (equivalent to £997,100 in 2023).

== Career ==
He entered the service of the Great Western Railway in 1850 in the Accountants’ Department. In 1854 he transferred to the Traffic Department and in 1857 became goods superintendent at Wolverhampton with the West Midland District. In 1862 he moved to be Superintendent of the Windsor district, in 1865 the Hereford Division and in 1873 the Birmingham Division. In 1879 he was assistant superintendent of the line and in 1888 superintendent of the line.

During his time with the company he had the responsibility for the arrangements for the Royal Train, one example being in June 1881 when Queen Victoria, Princess Beatrice, Princess Victoria and Elizabeth of Hesse travelled from Scotland. Mr. Burlinson took control of the train at Bushbury Junction for the remainder of the journey to Windsor.

He retired in 1894 and was presented with a gold pin ornamented with a crown and the monogram “V.R.” by Queen Victoria as an acknowledgement for his attention during her journeys over the Great Western Railway system.

Professional and academic associations
Preceded by George Nugent Tyrrell	Superintendent of the Line of the Great Western Railway; 1894–1904	Succeeded by Thomas Isaac Allen
