= Great Western Railway =

British railway company (1833–1947)

- Logo of the Great Western Railway, incorporating the shields, crests and mottoes of the cities of London (left) and Bristol (right)

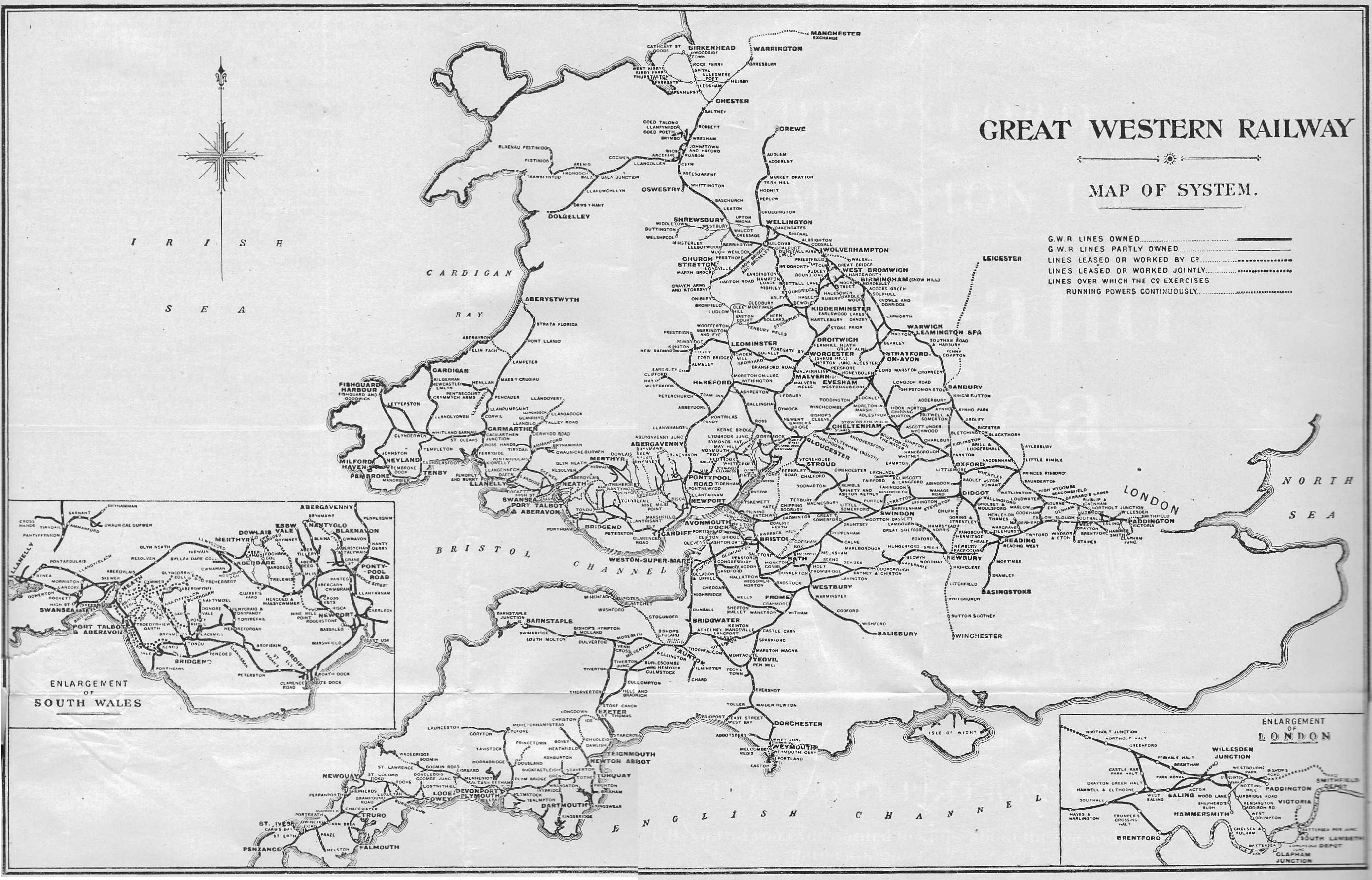
- Map of the railway pre-grouping (1920)

- Map of the railway post-grouping (1926)

History
- 1835: Act of incorporation
- 1838: First train ran
- 1869–92: 7 ft 1/4 in (2,140 mm) Brunel gauge changed to 4 ft 8 1/2 in (1,435 mm) standard gauge
- 1903: Start of road motor services
- 1923: Keeps identity though the Grouping
- 1935: Centenary
- 1948: Nationalised

Successor organisation
- 1948: British Rail, Western Region
Constituent companies
See full list of constituents of the GWR
1854	Shrewsbury and Birmingham Railway; Shrewsbury and Chester Railway
1862	South Wales Railway
1863	West Midland Railway
1876	Bristol and Exeter Railway; South Devon Railway
1889	Cornwall Railway
1922	Rhymney Railway; Taff Vale Railway; Cambrian Railways
1923	Midland & S W Junction Railway

Key locations
- Headquarters: Paddington station, London
- Locale: England; Wales
- Workshops: Swindon; Wolverhampton
- Major stations: Birmingham Snow Hill; Bristol Temple Meads; Cardiff General; London Paddington; Reading General
Route mileage
Mileage shown as at end of year stated
1841	171 miles (275 km)
1863	1,106 miles (1,780 km)
1876	2,023 miles (3,256 km)
1899	2,504 miles (4,030 km)
1919	2,996 miles 68 chains (4,823.0 km)
1921	3,005 miles (4,836 km)
1924	3,797 miles (6,111 km)
1925	3,819 miles 69 chains (6,147.5 km)

The Great Western Railway (GWR) was a British railway company that linked London with the South West, West and West Midlands of England and most of Wales. It was founded in 1833, received its enabling act of Parliament on 31 August 1835 and ran its first trains in 1838, with the initial route completed between London and Bristol in 1841. It was engineered by Isambard Kingdom Brunel, who chose a broad gauge of 7 ft (2,134 mm); it was slightly widened later to 7 ft 1/4 in (2,140 mm). From 1854, a series of amalgamations saw it also operate 4 ft 8 1/2 in (1,435 mm) standard gauge trains; the last broad gauge services were operated in 1892.

The GWR was the only company to keep its identity through the Railways Act 1921, which amalgamated it with the remaining independent railways within its territory; it was finally merged at the end of 1947, when it was nationalised and became the Western Region of British Railways.

The GWR was called by some "God's Wonderful Railway" and the "Great Way Round" by others. It was famed as the "Holiday Line", taking many people to English and Bristol Channel resorts in the West Country, such as Torquay in Devon, Minehead in Somerset, and Newquay and St Ives in Cornwall. The company's locomotives, many of which were built in the company's workshops at Swindon, were painted a middle chrome green colour while, for most of its existence, it used a two-tone "chocolate and cream" livery for its passenger coaches. Goods wagons were painted red, but this was later changed to mid-grey.

Great Western trains included long-distance express services such as the Flying Dutchman, the Cornish Riviera Express and the Cheltenham Spa Express. It also operated many suburban and rural services, some operated by steam rail motors or autotrains. The company pioneered the use of larger, more economic goods wagons than were usual in Britain. It ran ferry services to Ireland and the Channel Islands; operated a network of road motor (bus) routes; was a part of the Railway Air Services; and owned ships, canals, docks and hotels.

== History ==
=== Formation ===
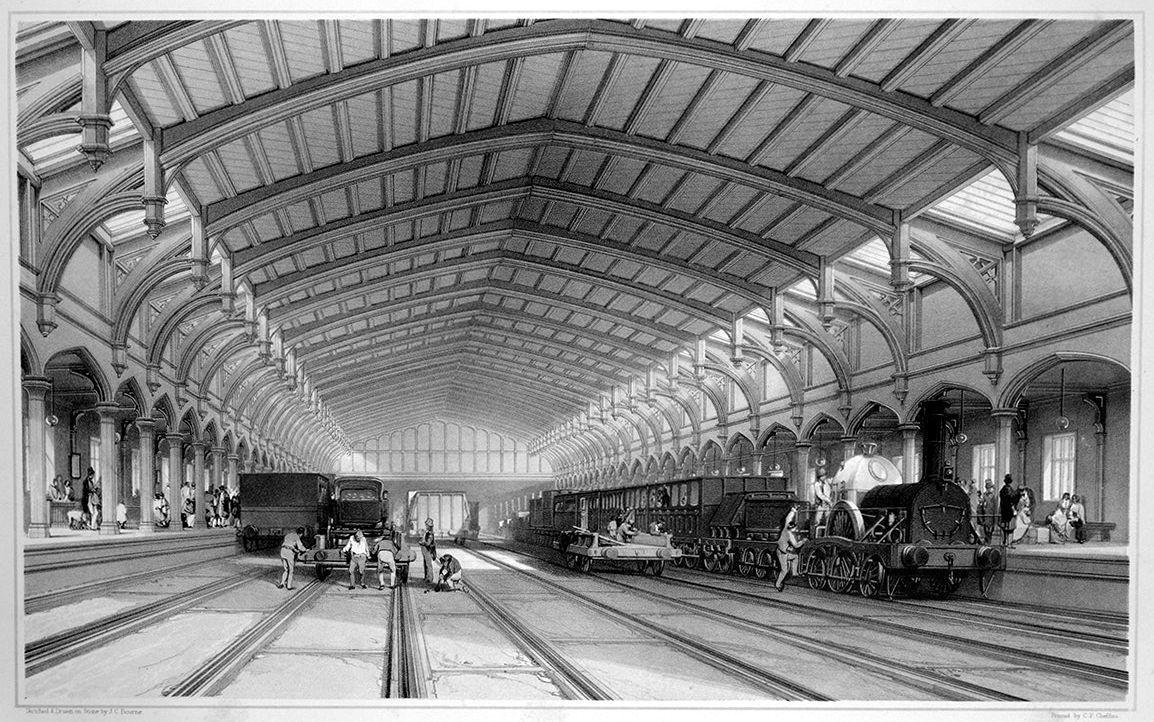
The interior of Brunel's train-shed at Temple Meads, the first Bristol terminus of the GWR, from an engraving by J.C. Bourne

The Great Western Railway originated from the desire of Bristol merchants to maintain their city as the second port of the country and the chief one for American trade. The increase in the size of ships and the gradual silting of the river Avon had made Liverpool an increasingly attractive port; with a Liverpool to London railway line under construction in the 1830s, Bristol's status was threatened. The answer for Bristol was, with the co-operation of London interests, to build a line of their own; a railway built to unprecedented standards of excellence to outperform the lines being constructed to the North West of England.

Great Western Railway Act 1835
- Act of Parliament
- Parliament of the United Kingdom
- Long title: An Act for making a Railway from Bristol to join the London and Birmingham Railway near London, to be called "The Great Western Railway," with Branches therefrom to the Towns of Bradford and Trowbridge in the County of Wilts.
- Citation: 5 & 6 Will. 4. c. cvii

Dates
- Royal assent: 31 August 1835

The company was founded at a meeting in Bristol on 21 January 1833. Isambard Kingdom Brunel, then aged 27, was appointed engineer on 7 March 1833. The name Great Western Railway was adopted on 19 August 1833, and the company was incorporated by the Great Western Railway Act 1835 (5 & 6 Will. 4. c. cvii) on 31 August 1835.

=== Route of the line ===
This was by far Brunel's largest contract to date. From the outset he wanted a line that offered the highest possible speeds, and to this end made two controversial decisions. Firstly, he chose to use a broad gauge of 7 ft (2,134 mm) to allow for the possibility of large wheels outside the bodies of the rolling stock, which could give smoother running. Secondly, he selected a route north of the Marlborough Downs, which allowed for gentler gradients and therefore higher speeds. From London, the route would run west as far as Reading, then make a sweeping deviation to the north before returning to the east–west alignment at Bath. Although this route had no significant towns it offered potential connections to Oxford and Gloucester. Brunel reasoned the higher speeds and limited stops would achieve shorter journey times overall.

Brunel surveyed the entire length of the route between London and Bristol himself, with the help of many, including his solicitor, Jeremiah Osborne of the Bristol law firm Osborne Clarke, who on one occasion rowed Brunel down the Avon to survey the bank of the river for the route.

=== Construction of the line ===
George Thomas Clark played an important role as an engineer on the project, reputedly taking the management of two divisions of the route including bridges over the River Thames at Lower Basildon and Moulsford and of Paddington Station. Involvement in major earth-moving works seems to have fed Clark's interest in geology and archaeology and he, anonymously, authored two guidebooks on the railway: one illustrated with lithographs by John Cooke Bourne; the other, a critique of Brunel's methods and the broad gauge.

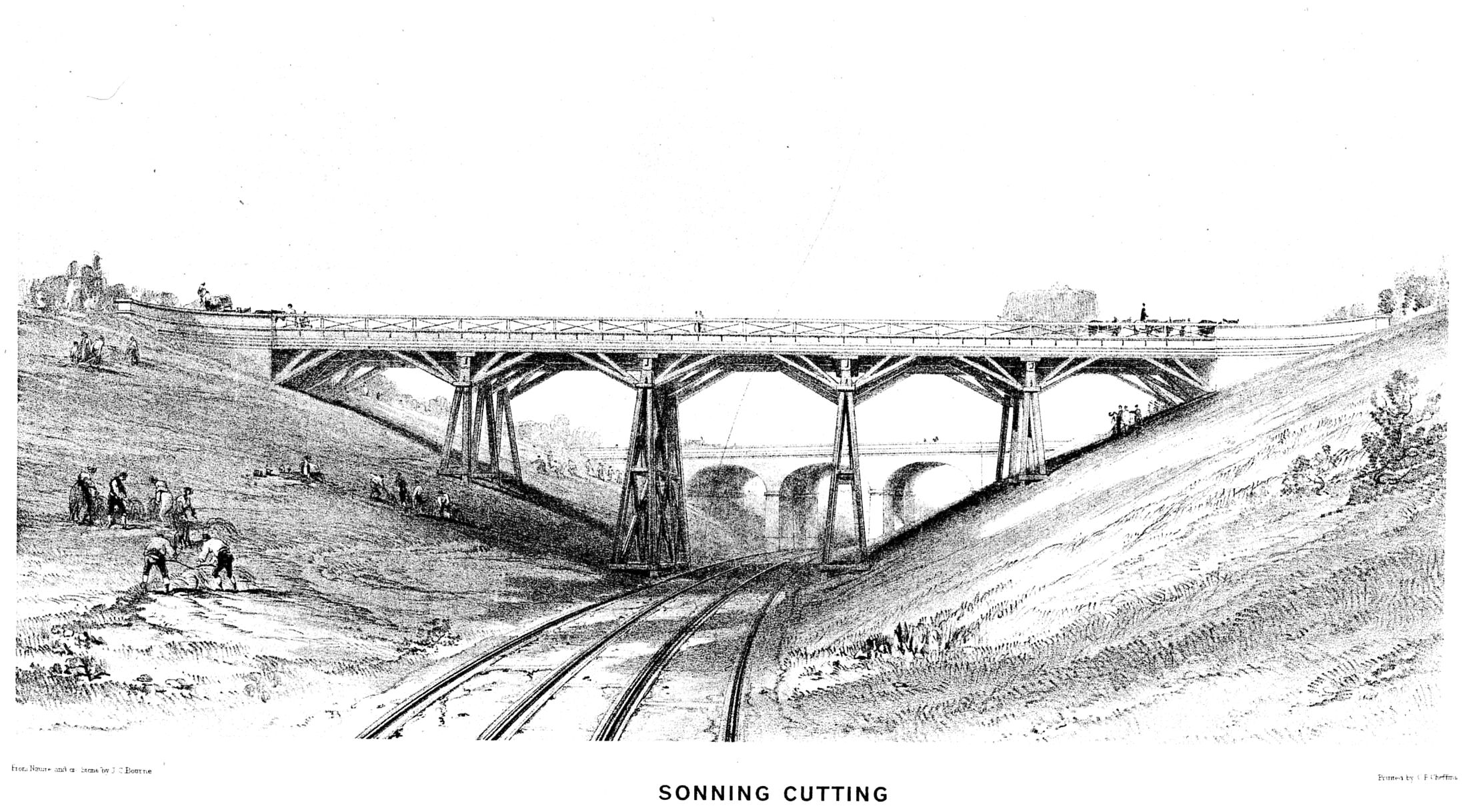
The Sonning Cutting in 1846

The first 22 1/2 miles (36 km) of line, from Paddington station in London to Maidenhead Bridge station, opened on 4 June 1838. When Maidenhead Railway Bridge was ready the line was extended to Twyford on 1 July 1839 and then through the deep Sonning Cutting to Reading on 30 March 1840. The cutting was the scene of a significant accident two years later when a goods train ran into a landslip; ten passengers who were travelling in open trucks were killed. This prompted Parliament to pass the Railway Regulation Act 1844, requiring railway companies to provide better carriages for passengers.

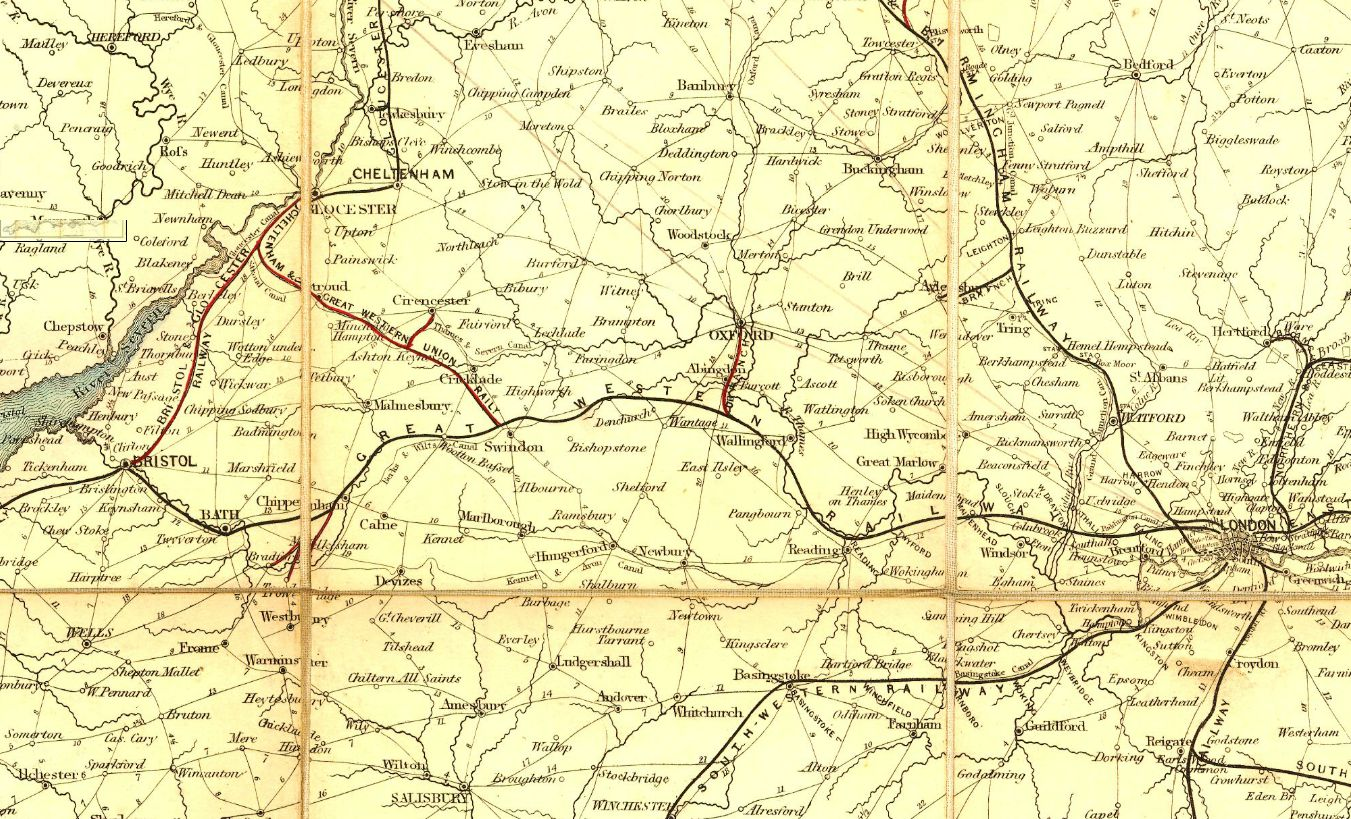
Route of the Great Western Railway on Cheffin's Map, 1850; the sweep to the north from Reading is clearly seen

The next section, from Reading to Steventon crossed the Thames twice and opened for traffic on 1 June 1840. A 7 1/4-mile (12 km) extension took the line to Faringdon Road on 20 July 1840. Meanwhile, work had started at the Bristol end of the line, where the 11 1/2-mile (19 km) section to Bath opened on 31 August 1840.

On 17 December 1840, the line from London reached a temporary terminus at Wootton Bassett Road west of Swindon and 80.25 miles (129 km) from Paddington. The section from Wootton Bassett Road to Chippenham was opened on 31 May 1841, as was Swindon Junction station where the Cheltenham and Great Western Union Railway (C&GWUR) to Cirencester connected. That was an independent line worked by the GWR, as was the Bristol and Exeter Railway (B&ER), the first section of which from Bristol to Bridgwater was opened on 14 June 1841. The GWR main line remained incomplete during the construction of the 1-mile-1,452-yard (2.94 km) Box Tunnel, which was ready for trains on 30 June 1841, after which trains ran the 152 miles (245 km) from Paddington through to Bridgwater. In 1851, the GWR purchased the Kennet and Avon Canal, which was a competing carrier between London, Reading, Bath and Bristol.

The GWR was closely involved with the C&GWUR and the B&ER and with several other broad-gauge railways. The South Devon Railway was completed in 1849, extending the broad gauge to Plymouth, whence the Cornwall Railway took it over the Royal Albert Bridge and into Cornwall in 1859 and, in 1867, it reached Penzance over the West Cornwall Railway which originally had been laid in 1852 with the 4 ft 8 1/2 in (1,435 mm) standard gauge or "narrow gauge" as it was known at the time. The South Wales Railway had opened between Chepstow and Swansea in 1850 and became connected to the GWR by Brunel's Chepstow Bridge in 1852. It was completed to Neyland in 1856, where a transatlantic port was established.

There was initially no direct line from London to Wales as the tidal River Severn was too wide to cross. Trains instead had to follow a lengthy route via Gloucester, where the river was narrow enough to be crossed by a bridge. Work on the Severn Tunnel had begun in 1873, but unexpected underwater springs delayed the work and prevented its opening until 1886.

=== Brunel's seven-foot gauge and the "gauge war" ===
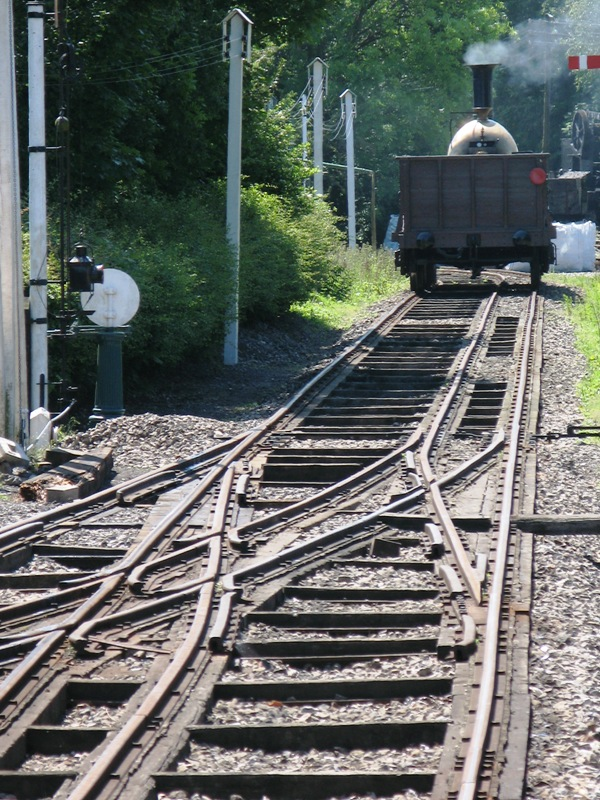
A broad-gauge train on mixed-gauge track

Brunel had devised a 7 ft (2,134 mm) track gauge for his railways in 1835. He later added 1/4 inch (6.4 mm), probably to reduce friction of the wheel sets in curves. This became the 7 ft 1/4 in (2,140 mm) broad gauge. (Note: In History of the Great Western Railway (1927 Edition, Volume 1, Part 1, Page 49), MacDermot states in a footnote "In laying the rails an extra quarter of an inch was allowed on the straight, making the gauge 7 ft. 1/4 in. strictly speaking, but it was always referred to as 7 feet.") Either gauge may be referred to as Brunel gauge.

In 1844, the broad-gauge Bristol and Gloucester Railway had opened, but Gloucester was already served by the 4 ft 8 1/2 in (1,435 mm) standard gauge lines of the Birmingham and Gloucester Railway. This resulted in a break of gauge that forced all passengers and goods to change trains if travelling between the south-west and the North. This was the beginning of the "gauge war" and led to the appointment by Parliament of a Gauge Commission, which reported in 1846 in favour of standard gauge so the 7-foot gauge was proscribed by law (Railway Regulation (Gauge) Act 1846) except for the southwest of England and Wales where connected to the GWR network.

Other railways in Britain were to use standard gauge. In 1846, the Bristol and Gloucester was bought by the Midland Railway and it was converted to standard gauge in 1854, which brought mixed-gauge track to Temple Meads station – this had three rails to allow trains to run on either broad or standard gauge.

The GWR extended into the West Midlands in competition with the Midland and the London and North Western Railway. Birmingham was reached through Oxford in 1852 and Wolverhampton in 1854. This was the furthest north that the broad gauge reached. In the same year the Shrewsbury and Birmingham Railway and the Shrewsbury and Chester Railway both amalgamated with the GWR, but these lines were standard gauge, and the GWR's own line north of Oxford had been built with mixed gauge.

This mixed gauge was extended southwards from Oxford to Basingstoke at the end of 1856 and so allowed through goods traffic from the north of England to the south coast (via the London and South Western Railway – LSWR) without transshipment.

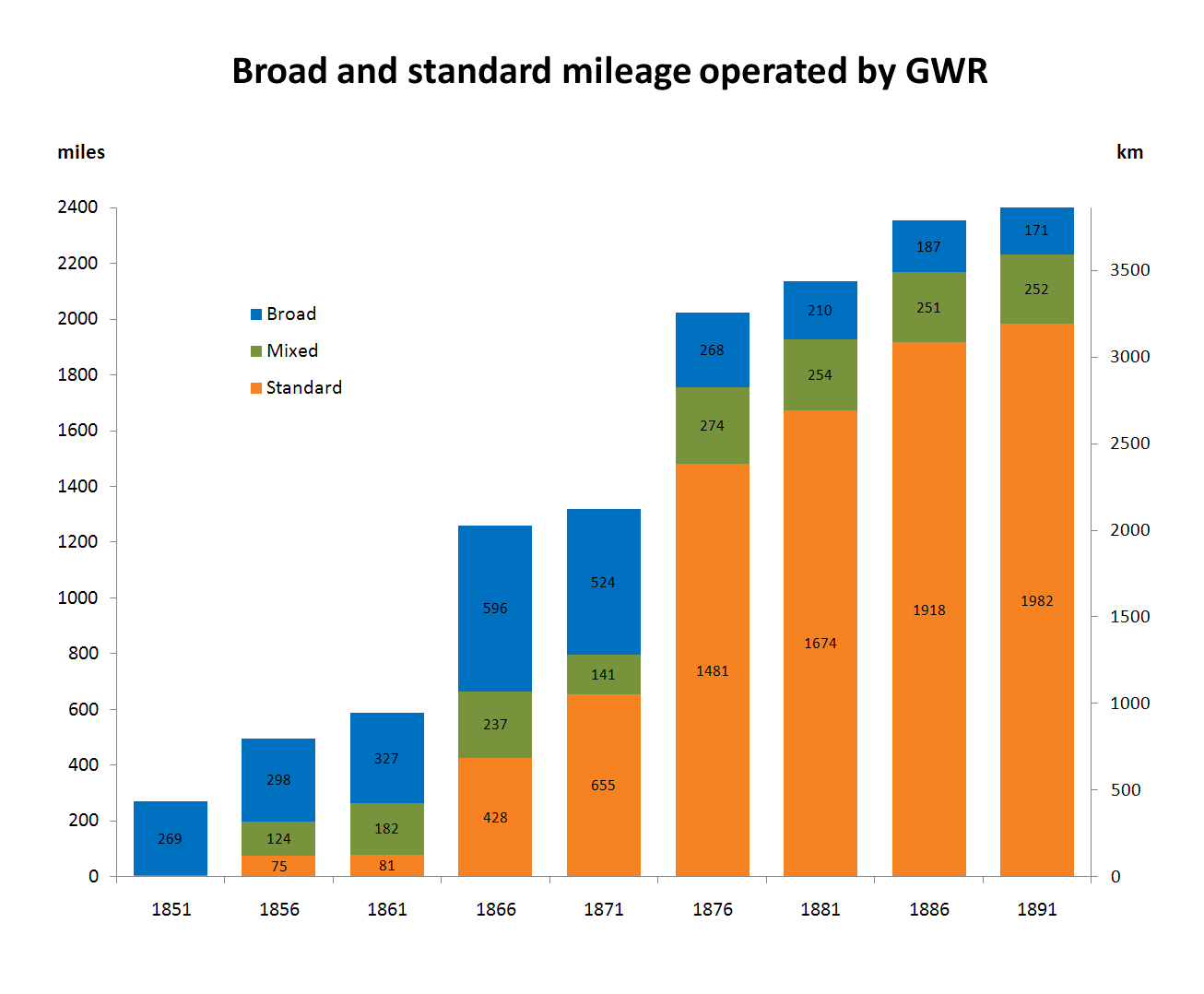
Broad and standard mileage operated by GWR Key • Broad gauge – blue (top) • Mixed gauge – green (middle) • Standard gauge – orange (bottom) Values to chart: 31 December / Broad / Mixed / Standard; 1851 / 269 miles (433 km) / 3 miles (5 km) / 0 miles (0 km); 1856 / 298 miles (480 km) / 124 miles (200 km) / 75 miles (121 km); 1861 / 327 miles (526 km) / 182 miles (293 km) / 81 miles (130 km); 1866 / 596 miles (959 km) / 237 miles (381 km) / 428 miles (689 km); 1871 / 524 miles (843 km) / 141 miles (227 km) / 655 miles (1,054 km); 1876 / 268 miles (431 km) / 274 miles (441 km) / 1,481 miles (2,383 km); 1881 / 210 miles (340 km) / 254 miles (409 km) / 1,674 miles (2,694 km); 1886 / 187 miles (301 km) / 251 miles (404 km) / 1,918 miles (3,087 km); 1891 / 171 miles (275 km) / 252 miles (406 km) / 1,982 miles (3,190 km)

The line to Basingstoke had originally been built by the Berks and Hants Railway as a broad-gauge route in an attempt to keep the standard gauge of the LSWR out of Great Western territory but, in 1857, the GWR and LSWR opened a shared line to Weymouth on the south coast, the GWR route being via Chippenham and a route initially started by the Wilts, Somerset and Weymouth Railway.

Further west, the LSWR took over the broad-gauge Exeter and Crediton Railway and North Devon Railway, also the standard-gauge Bodmin and Wadebridge Railway. It was several years before these remote lines were connected with the parent LSWR system and any through traffic to them was handled by the GWR and its associated companies.

By now the gauge war was lost and mixed gauge was brought to Paddington in 1861, allowing through passenger trains from London to Chester. The broad-gauge South Wales Railway amalgamated with the GWR in 1862, as did the West Midland Railway, which brought with it the Oxford, Worcester and Wolverhampton Railway, a line that had been conceived as another broad-gauge route to the Midlands but which had been built as standard gauge after several battles, both political and physical.

On 1 April 1869, the broad gauge was taken out of use between Oxford and Wolverhampton and from Reading to Basingstoke. In August, the line from Grange Court to Hereford was converted from broad to standard and the whole of the line from Swindon through Gloucester to South Wales was similarly treated in May 1872. In 1874, the mixed gauge was extended along the main line to Chippenham and the line from there to Weymouth was narrowed. The following year saw mixed gauge laid through the Box Tunnel, with the broad gauge now retained only for through services beyond Bristol and on a few branch lines.

The Bristol and Exeter Railway amalgamated with the GWR on 1 January 1876. It had already made a start on mixing the gauge on its line, a task completed through to Exeter on 1 March 1876 by the GWR. The station here had been shared with the LSWR since 1862. This rival company had continued to push westwards over its Exeter and Crediton line and arrived in Plymouth later in 1876, which spurred the South Devon Railway to also amalgamate with the Great Western. The Cornwall Railway remained a nominally independent line until 1889, although the GWR held a large number of shares in the company.

One final new broad-gauge route was opened on 1 June 1877, the St Ives branch in west Cornwall, although there was also a small extension at Sutton Harbour in Plymouth in 1879. Part of a mixed gauge point remains at Sutton Harbour, one of the few examples of broad gauge trackwork remaining in situ anywhere.

Once the GWR was in control of the whole line from London to Penzance, it set about converting the remaining broad-gauge tracks. The last broad-gauge service left Paddington station on Friday, 20 May 1892; the following Monday, trains from Penzance were operated by standard-gauge locomotives.

=== Into the 20th century ===
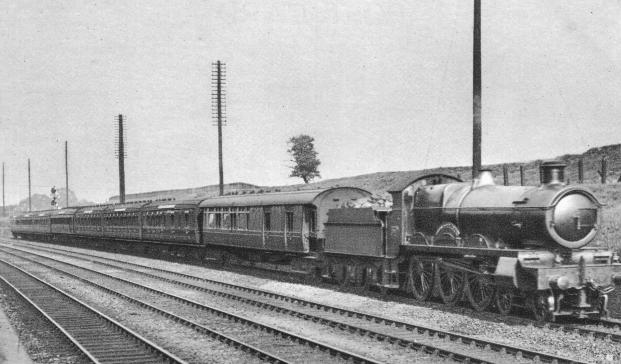
New corridor coaches on the Cornish Riviera Express

After 1892, with the burden of operating trains on two gauges removed, the company turned its attention to constructing new lines and upgrading old ones to shorten the company's previously circuitous routes. The principal new lines opened were:

- 1900: Stert and Westbury linking the Berks and Hants line with Westbury to create a shorter route to Weymouth for the Channel Islands traffic.
- 1903: the South Wales and Bristol Direct Railway from Wootton Bassett Junction to link up with the Severn Tunnel.
- 1904: a diversion of the Cornish Main Line between Saltash and St Germans, eliminating the last wooden viaducts on the main line.
- 1906: the Langport and Castle Cary Railway to shorten the journey from London to Penzance between Reading and Taunton.
- 1908: the Birmingham and North Warwickshire which, combined with the Cheltenham and Honeybourne of 1906, offered a new route from Birmingham via Stratford-upon-Avon to south Wales.
- 1910: the Birmingham Direct Line built jointly with the Great Central Railway to give a shorter route from London to Aynho and the North.
- 1913: the Swansea District Lines which allowed trains to Fishguard Harbour to avoid Swansea. Fishguard had been opened in an attempt to attract transatlantic liner traffic and provided a better facility for the Anglo-Irish ferries than that at Neyland.

The generally conservative GWR made other improvements in the years before World War I such as restaurant cars, better conditions for third class passengers, steam heating of trains, and faster express services. These were largely at the initiative of T. I. Allen, the Superintendent of the Line and one of a group of talented senior managers who led the railway into the Edwardian era: Viscount Emlyn (Earl Cawdor, Chairman from 1895 to 1905); Sir Joseph Wilkinson (general manager from 1896 to 1903), his successor, the former chief engineer Sir James Inglis; and George Jackson Churchward (the Chief Mechanical Engineer). It was during this period that the GWR introduced road motor services as an alternative to building new lines in rural areas, and started using steam rail motors to bring cheaper operation to existing branch lines.

=== One of the "Big Four" ===
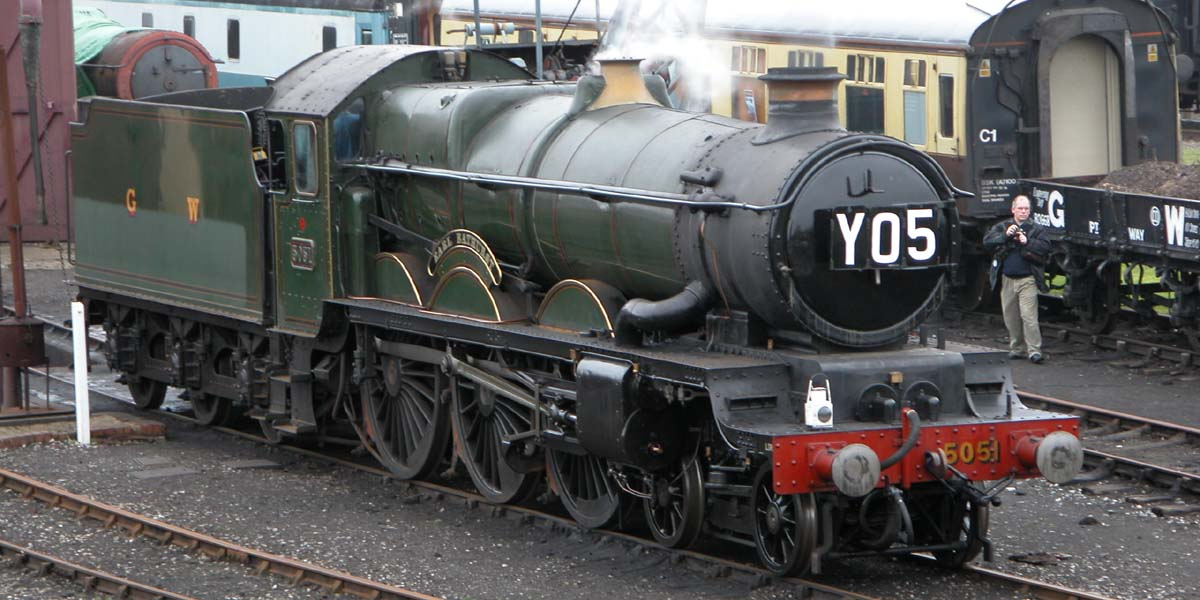
1923 saw the construction of the first of 171 Castle Class locomotives

At the outbreak of World War I in 1914, the GWR was taken into government control, as were most major railways in Britain. Many of its staff joined the armed forces and it was more difficult to build and maintain equipment than in peacetime. After the war, the government considered permanent nationalisation but decided instead on a compulsory amalgamation of the railways into four large groups. The GWR alone preserved its name through the "grouping", under which smaller companies were amalgamated into four main companies in 1922 and 1923. The GWR built a war memorial at Paddington station, unveiled in 1922, in memory of its employees who were killed in the war.

The new Great Western Railway had more routes in Wales, including 295 miles (475 km) of former Cambrian Railways lines and 124 miles (200 km) from the Taff Vale Railway. A few independent lines in its English area of operations were also added, notably the Midland and South Western Junction Railway, a line previously working closely with the Midland Railway but which now gave the GWR a second station at Swindon, along with a line that carried through-traffic from the North via Cheltenham and Andover to Southampton.

The 1930s brought hard times but the company remained in fair financial health despite the Depression. The Development (Loans, Guarantees and Grants) Act 1929 allowed the GWR to obtain money in return for stimulating employment and this was used to improve stations including London Paddington, Bristol Temple Meads and Cardiff General; to improve facilities at depots and to lay additional tracks to reduce congestion. The road motor services were transferred to local bus companies in which the GWR took a share but instead, it participated in air services.

A legacy of the broad gauge was that trains for some routes could be built slightly wider than was normal in Britain and these included the 1929-built "Super Saloons" used on the boat train services that conveyed transatlantic passengers to London in luxury. When the company celebrated its centenary during 1935, new "Centenary" carriages were built for the Cornish Riviera Express, which again made full use of the wider loading gauge on that route.

=== World War II and after ===
With the outbreak of World War II in 1939, the GWR returned to direct government control, and by the end of the war a Labour government was in power and again planning to nationalise the railways. After a couple of years trying to recover from the ravages of war, the GWR became the Western Region of British Railways on 1 January 1948. The Great Western Railway Company continued to exist as a legal entity for nearly two more years, being formally wound up on 23 December 1949. GWR designs of locomotives and rolling stock continued to be built for a while and the region maintained its own distinctive character, even painting for a while its stations and express trains in a form of chocolate and cream.

About 40 years after nationalisation British Rail was privatised and the old name was revived by Great Western Trains, the train operating company providing passenger services on the old GWR routes to South Wales and the South West. This subsequently became First Great Western, as part of the FirstGroup, but in September 2015 changed its name to Great Western Railway in order to 'reinstate the ideals of our founder'. The operating infrastructure, however, was transferred to Railtrack and has since passed to Network Rail. These companies have continued to preserve appropriate parts of its stations and bridges so historic GWR structures can still be recognised around the network.

== Geography ==
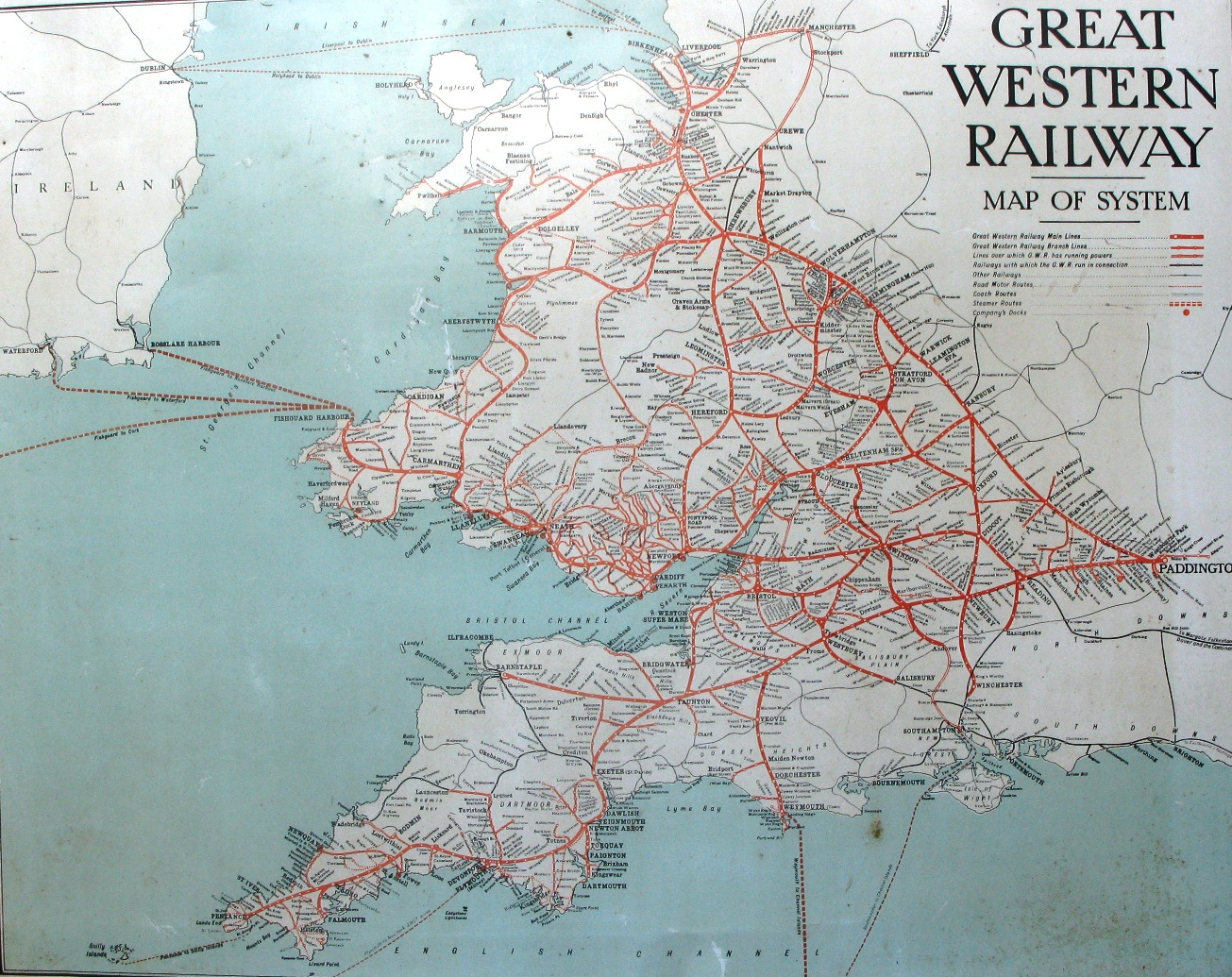
Map of the system c. 1930

The original Great Western Main Line linked London Paddington station with Temple Meads station in Bristol by way of Reading, Didcot, Swindon, Chippenham and Bath. This line was extended westwards through Exeter and Plymouth to reach Truro and Penzance, the most westerly railway station in England. Brunel and Gooch placed the GWR's main locomotive workshops close to the village of Swindon and the locomotives of many trains were changed here in the early years. Up to this point the route had climbed very gradually westwards from London, but from here it changed into one with steeper gradients which, with the primitive locomotives available to Brunel, was better operated by types with smaller wheels better able to climb the hills. These gradients faced both directions, first dropping down through Wootton Bassett Junction to cross the River Avon, then climbing back up through Chippenham to the Box Tunnel before descending once more to regain the River Avon's valley which it followed to Bath and Bristol.

Swindon was also the junction for a line that ran north-westwards to Gloucester then south-westwards on the far side of the River Severn to reach Cardiff, Swansea and west Wales. This route was later shortened by the opening of a more direct east–west route through the Severn Tunnel. Another route ran northwards from Didcot to Oxford from where two different routes continued to Wolverhampton, one through Birmingham and the other through Worcester. Beyond Wolverhampton the line continued via Shrewsbury to Chester and (via a joint line with the LNWR) onwards to Birkenhead and Warrington; another route via Market Drayton enabled the GWR to reach Crewe. Operating agreements with other companies also allowed GWR trains to run to Manchester. South of the London to Bristol main line were routes from Didcot to Southampton via Newbury, and from Chippenham to Weymouth via Westbury.

A network of cross-country routes linked these main lines, and there were also many and varied branch lines. Some were short, such as the 3 1/2-mile (5.6 km) Clevedon branch line; others were much longer such as the 23-mile (37 km) Minehead Branch. A few were promoted and built by the GWR to counter competition from other companies, such as the Reading to Basingstoke Line to keep the London and South Western Railway away from Newbury. However, many were built by local companies that then sold their railway to their larger neighbour; examples include the Launceston and Brixham branches. Further variety came from the traffic carried: holidaymakers (St Ives);. royalty (Windsor); or just goods traffic (Carbis Wharf).

Brunel envisaged the GWR continuing across the Atlantic Ocean and built the SS Great Western to carry the railway's passengers from Bristol to New York. Most traffic for North America soon switched to the larger port of Liverpool (in other railways' territories) but some transatlantic passengers were landed at Plymouth and conveyed to London by special train. Great Western ships linked Great Britain with Ireland, the Channel Islands and France.

=== Key locations ===
The railway's headquarters were established at Paddington station. Its locomotives and rolling stock were built and maintained at Swindon Works but other workshops were acquired as it amalgamated with other railways, including the Shrewsbury companies' Stafford Road works at Wolverhampton, and the South Devon's workshops at Newton Abbot. Worcester Carriage Works was created by flattening land north of Worcester Shrub Hill Station, Reading Signal Works was established in buildings to the north of Reading railway station, and in later years a concrete manufacturing depot was established at Taunton where items ranging from track components to bridges were cast.

=== Engineering features ===
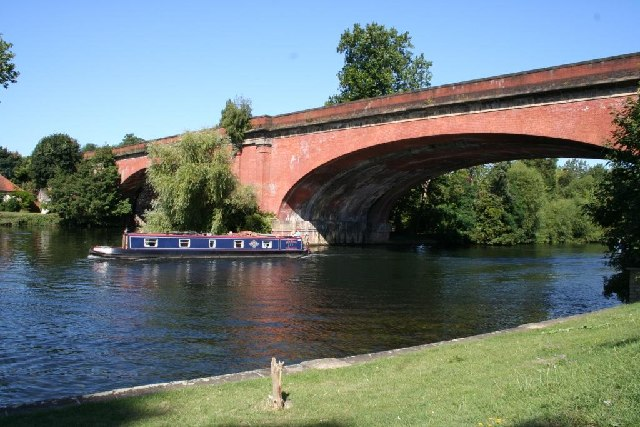
Maidenhead Railway Bridge

More than 150 years after its creation, the original main line has been described by historian Steven Brindle as "one of the masterpieces of railway design". Working westwards from Paddington, the line crosses the valley of the River Brent on Wharncliffe Viaduct and the River Thames on Maidenhead Railway Bridge, which at the time of construction was the largest span achieved by a brick arch bridge. The line then continues through Sonning Cutting before reaching Reading after which it crosses the Thames twice more, on Gatehampton and Moulsford bridges. Between Chippenham and Bath is Box Tunnel, the longest railway tunnel driven by that time. Several years later, the railway opened the even longer Severn Tunnel to carry a new line between England and Wales beneath the river Severn.

Some other notable structures were added when smaller companies were amalgamated into the GWR. These include the South Devon Railway sea wall, the Cornwall Railway's Royal Albert Bridge, and Barmouth Bridge on the Cambrian Railways.

== Operations ==
In the early years the GWR was managed by two committees, one in Bristol and one in London. They soon combined as a single board of directors which met in offices at Paddington.

The board was led by a chairman and supported by a secretary and other "officers". The first Locomotive Superintendent was Daniel Gooch, although from 1915 the title was changed to Chief Mechanical Engineer. The first Goods Manager was appointed in 1850 and from 1857 this position was filled by James Grierson until 1863 when he became the first general manager. In 1864 the post of Superintendent of the Line was created to oversee the running of the trains.

=== Passenger services ===
Year	Passengers	Train mileage	Receipts
1850	2,491,712	1,425,573	£630,515 (£73.4 million in 2025)
1875	36,024,592	9,435,876	£2,528,305 (£252 million in 2025)
1900	80,944,483	23,279,499	£5,207,513 (£553 million in 2025)
1924	140,241,113	37,997,377	£13,917,942 (£732 million in 2025)
1934	110,813,041	40,685,597	£10,569,140 (£654 million in 2025)
Passenger numbers exclude season ticket journeys.

Early trains offered passengers a choice of first- or second-class carriages. In 1840 this choice was extended: passengers could be conveyed by the slow goods trains in what became third-class. The Railway Regulation Act 1844 made it a legal requirement that the GWR, along with all other British railways, had to serve each station with trains which included third-class accommodation at a fare of not more than one penny per mile and a speed of at least 12 mph (19 km/h). By 1882, third-class carriages were attached to all trains except for the fastest expresses. Another parliamentary order meant that trains began to include smoking carriages from 1868.

Special "excursion" cheap-day tickets were first issued in May 1849 and season tickets in 1851. Until 1869 most revenue came from second-class passengers but the volume of third-class passengers grew to the extent that second-class facilities were withdrawn in 1912. The Cheap Trains Act 1883 resulted in the provision of workmen's trains at special low fares at certain times of the day.

The principal express services were often given nicknames by railwaymen but these names later appeared officially in timetables, on headboards carried on the locomotive, and on roofboards above the windows of the carriages. For instance, the late-morning Flying Dutchman express between London and Exeter was named after the winning horse of the Derby and St Leger races in 1849. Although withdrawn at the end of 1867, the name was revived in 1869 – following a request from the Bristol and Exeter Railway – and the train ran through to Plymouth. An afternoon express was instigated on the same route in June 1879 and became known as The Zulu. A third West Country express was introduced in 1890, running to and from Penzance as The Cornishman. A new service, the Cornish Riviera Express ran between London and Penzance – non-stop to Plymouth – from 1 July 1904, although it ran only in the summer during 1904 and 1905 before becoming a permanent feature of the timetable in 1906.

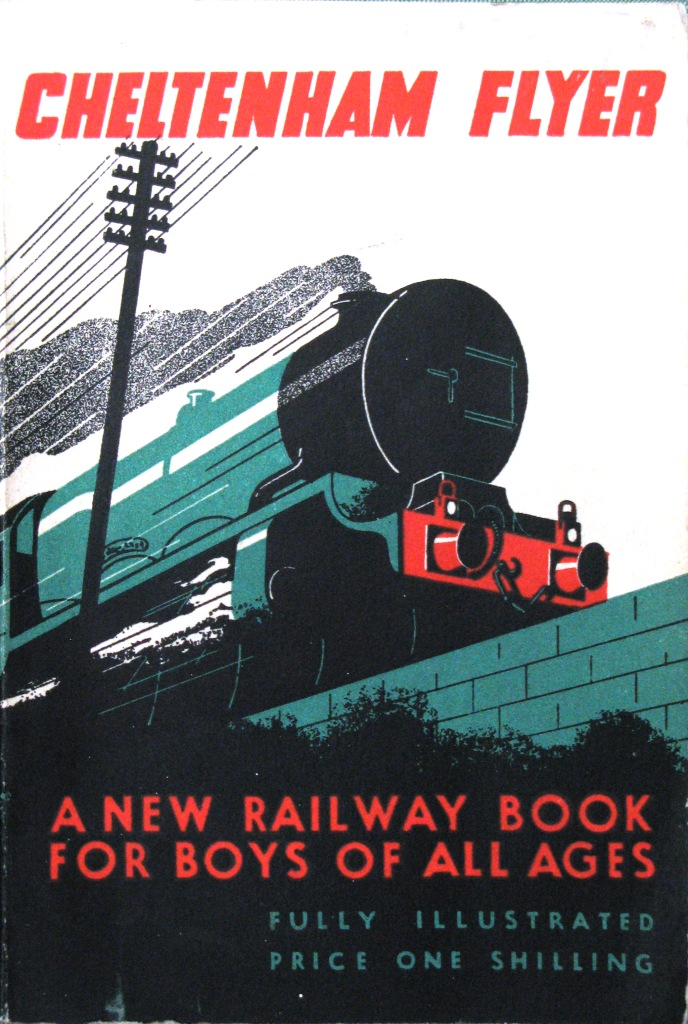
The Cheltenham Flyer was a GWR 'book for boys of all ages'

The Cheltenham Spa Express was the fastest train in the world when it was scheduled to cover the 77.25 miles (124.3 km) between Swindon and London at an average of 71.3 miles per hour (114.7 km/h). The train was nicknamed the 'Cheltenham Flyer' and featured in one of the GWR's 'Books for boys of all ages'. Other named trains included The Bristolian, running between London and Bristol from 1935, and the Torbay Express, which ran between London and Kingswear.

Many of these fast expresses included special coaches that could be detached as they passed through stations without stopping, a guard riding in the coach to uncouple it from the main train and bring it to a stop at the correct position. The first such "slip coach" was detached from the Flying Dutchman at Bridgwater in 1869. The company's first sleeping cars were operated between Paddington and Plymouth in 1877. Then on 1 October 1892 its first corridor train ran from Paddington to Birkenhead, and the following year saw the first trains heated by steam that was passed through the train in a pipe from the locomotive. May 1896 saw the introduction of first-class restaurant cars and the service was extended to all classes in 1903. Sleeping cars for third-class passengers were available from 1928.

Self-propelled "steam railmotors" were first used on 12 October 1903 between Stonehouse and Chalford; within five years 100 had been constructed. These trains had special retractable steps that could be used at stations with lower platforms than was usual in England. The railmotors proved so successful on many routes that they had to be supplemented by trailer cars with driving controls, the first of which entered service at the end of 1904. From the following year a number of small locomotives were fitted so that they could work with these trailers, the combined sets becoming known as "autotrains" and eventually replacing the steam rail motors. Diesel railcars were introduced in 1934. Some railcars were fully streamlined, some had buffet counters for long-distance services, and others were purely for parcels services.

=== Freight services ===
Year	Tonnage	Train mileage	Receipts
1850	350,000	330,817	£202,978 (£23.6 million in 2025)
1875	16,388,198	11,206,462	£3,140,093 (£313 million in 2025)
1900	37,500,510	23,135,685	£5,736,921 (£610 million in 2025)
1924	81,723,133	25,372,106	£17,571,537 (£924 million in 2025)
1934	64,619,892	22,707,235	£14,500,385 (£900 million in 2025)
Tonnage for 1850 is approximate.

Passenger traffic was the main source of revenue for the GWR when it first opened but goods were also carried in separate trains. It was not until the coal-mining and industrial districts of Wales and the Midlands were reached that goods traffic became significant; in 1856 the Ruabon Coal Company signed an agreement with the GWR to transport coal to London at special rates which nonetheless was worth at least £40,000 each year to the railway.

As locomotives increased in size so did the length of goods trains, from 40 to as many as 100 four-wheeled wagons, although the gradient of the line often limited this. While typical goods wagons could carry 8, 10 or (later) 12 tons, the load placed into a wagon could be as little as 1 ton. The many smaller consignments were sent to a local transhipment centre where they were re-sorted into larger loads for the main segment of their journey. There were more than 550 "station truck" workings running on timetabled goods trains carrying small consignments to and from specified stations, and 200 "pick up" trucks that collected small loads from groups of stations.

The GWR provided special wagons, handling equipment and storage facilities for its largest traffic flows. For example, the coal mines in Wales sent much of their coal to the docks along the coast, many of which were owned and equipped by the railway, as were some in Cornwall that exported most of the china clay production of that county. The wagons provided for both these traffic flows (both those owned by the GWR and the mining companies) were fitted with end doors that allowed their loads to be tipped straight into the ships' holds using wagon-tipping equipment on the dockside. Special wagons were produced for many other different commodities such as gunpowder, aeroplane propellers, motor cars, fruit and fish.

Heavy traffic was carried from the agricultural and fishing areas in the southwest of England, often in fast "perishables" trains, for instance more than 3,500 cattle were sent from Grampound Road in the 12 months to June 1869, and in 1876 nearly than 17,000 tons of fish was carried from west Cornwall to London. The perishables trains running in the nineteenth century used wagons built to the same standards as passenger coaches, with vacuum brakes and large wheels to allow fast running. Ordinary goods trains on the GWR, as on all other British railways at the time, had wheels close together (around 9 feet (2.7 m) apart), smaller wheels and only hand brakes.

In 1905 the GWR ran its first vacuum-braked general goods train between London and Bristol using newly built goods wagons with small wheels but vacuum brakes. This was followed by other services to create a network of fast trains between the major centres of production and population that were scheduled to run at speeds averaging 35 mph (56 km/h). Other railway companies also followed the GWR's lead by providing their own vacuum-braked (or "fitted") services.

=== Ancillary operations ===
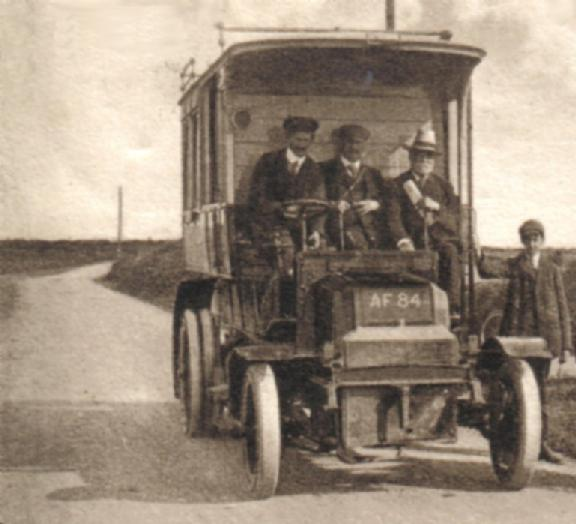
One of the first road motors working a service from Helston to The Lizard

A number of canals, such as the Kennet and Avon Canal and the Stratford-upon-Avon Canal, became the property of the railway when they were purchased to remove competition or objectors to proposed new lines. Most of these continued to be operated although they were only a small part of the railway company's business: in 1929 the canals took £16,278 of receipts while freight trains earned over £17 million. (£894,000 and £934 million respectively in 2025).

The Railways Act 1921 brought most of the large coal-exporting docks in South Wales into the GWR's ownership, such as those at Cardiff, Barry, and Swansea. They were added to a small number of docks along the south coast of England which the company already owned, to make it the largest docks operator in the world.

Powers were granted by Parliament for the GWR to operate ships in 1871. The following year the company took over the ships operated by Ford and Jackson on the route between Neyland in Wales and Waterford in Ireland. The Welsh terminal was relocated to Fishguard Harbour when the railway was opened to there in 1906. Services were also operated between Weymouth Quay and the Channel Islands from 1889 on the former Weymouth and Channel Islands Steam Packet Company routes. Smaller GWR vessels were also used as tenders at Plymouth Great Western Docks and, until the Severn Tunnel opened, on the River Severn crossing of the Bristol and South Wales Union Railway.

The first railway-operated bus services were started by the GWR between Helston railway station and The Lizard on 17 August 1903. Known by the company as "road motors", these chocolate-and-cream buses operated throughout the company's territory on railway feeder services and excursions until the 1930s when they were transferred to local bus companies (in most of which the GWR held a share).

The GWR inaugurated the first railway air service between Cardiff, Torquay and Plymouth in association with Imperial Airways. This grew to become part of the Railway Air Services.

== Motive power and rolling stock ==
=== Locomotives ===
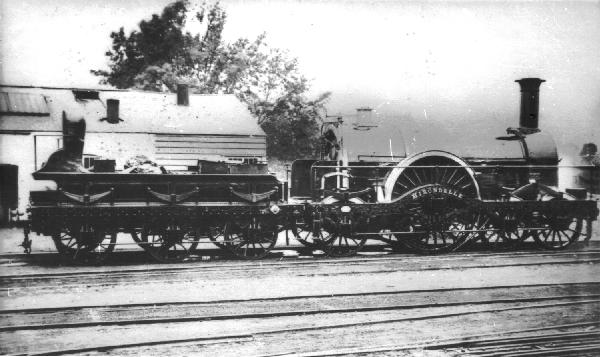
Broad gauge Iron Duke class locomotive Hirondelle, built in 1848

The GWR's first locomotives were specified by Isambard Kingdom Brunel but proved unsatisfactory. Daniel Gooch, who was just 20 years old, was soon appointed as the railway's Locomotive Superintendent and set about establishing a reliable fleet. He bought two locomotives from Robert Stephenson and Company which proved more successful than Brunel's, and then designed a series of standardised locomotives. From 1846 these could be built at the company's newly established railway workshops at Swindon. He designed several different 7 ft (2,134 mm) broad-gauge types for the growing railway, such as the Firefly 2-2-2s and later Iron Duke Class 4-2-2s. In 1864 Gooch was succeeded by Joseph Armstrong who brought his standard-gauge experience to the railway. Some of Armstrong's designs were built as either broad or standard gauge just by fitting different wheels; those needing tenders were given old ones from withdrawn broad-gauge locomotives.

Joseph Armstrong's early death in 1877 meant that the next phase of motive power design was the responsibility of William Dean who developed express 4-4-0 types rather than the single-driver 2-2-2s and 4-2-2s that had hauled fast trains up to that time. Dean retired in 1902 to be replaced by George Jackson Churchward, who introduced the familiar 4-6-0 locomotives. It was during Churchward's tenure that the term "Locomotive Superintendent" was changed to "Chief Mechanical Engineer" (CME). Charles Collett succeeded Churchward in 1921. He was soon responsible for the much larger fleet that the GWR operated following the Railways Act 1921 mergers. He set about replacing the older and less numerous classes, and rebuilding the remainder using as many standardised GWR components as possible. He also produced many new designs using standard parts, such as the Castle and King classes. The final CME was Frederick Hawksworth who took control in 1941, seeing the railway through wartime shortages and producing GWR-design locomotives until after nationalisation.

Brunel and Gooch both gave their locomotives names to identify them, but the standard-gauge companies that became a part of the GWR used numbers. Until 1864 the GWR therefore had named broad-gauge locomotives and numbered standard-gauge ones. From the time of Armstrong's arrival all new locomotives – both broad and standard – were given numbers, including broad-gauge ones that had previously carried names when they were acquired from other railways. Dean introduced a policy in 1895 of giving passenger tender locomotives both numbers and names. Each batch was given names with a distinctive theme, for example kings for the 6000 class and castles for the 4073 class.

The GWR first painted its locomotives a dark holly green but this was changed to middle chrome or Brunswick green for most of its existence. They initially had chocolate brown or Indian red frames but this was changed in the 20th century to black. Name and number plates were generally of polished brass with a black background, and chimneys often had copper rims or "caps".

Liveries through the years:

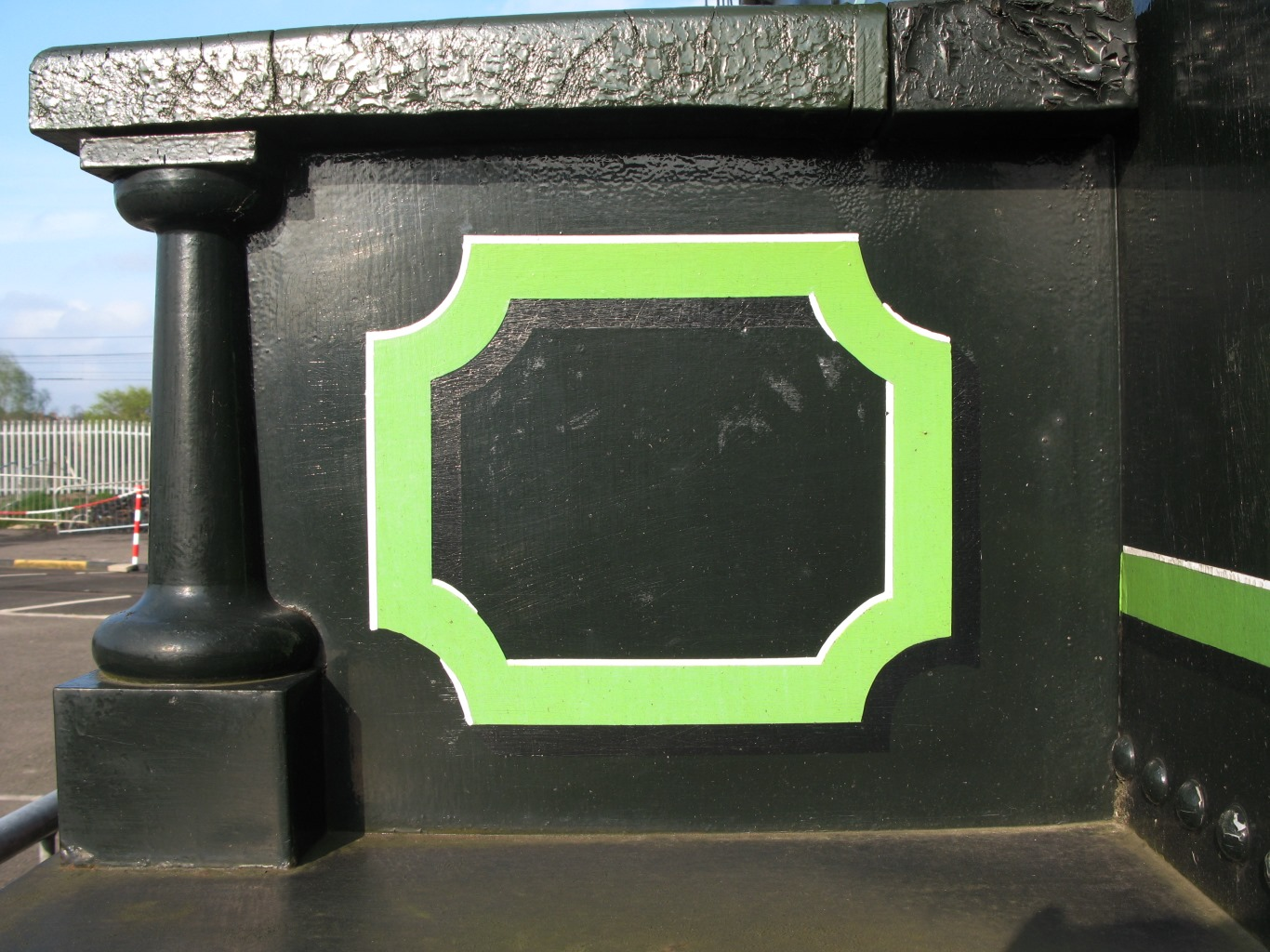
Iron Duke's tender: Holly green with pea green lining

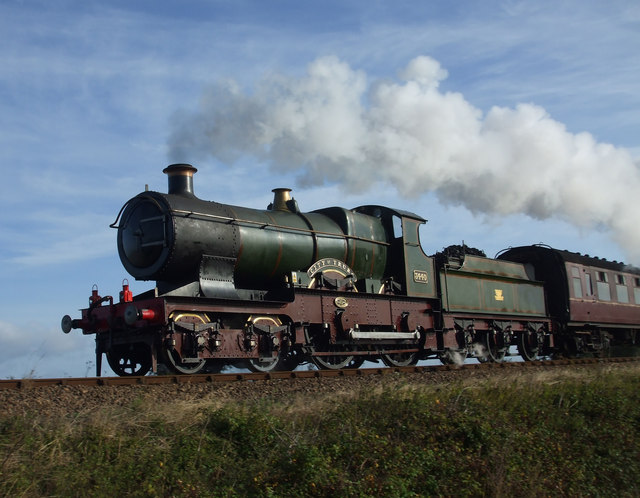
City of Truro: Middle Chrome green, orange lining and red frames

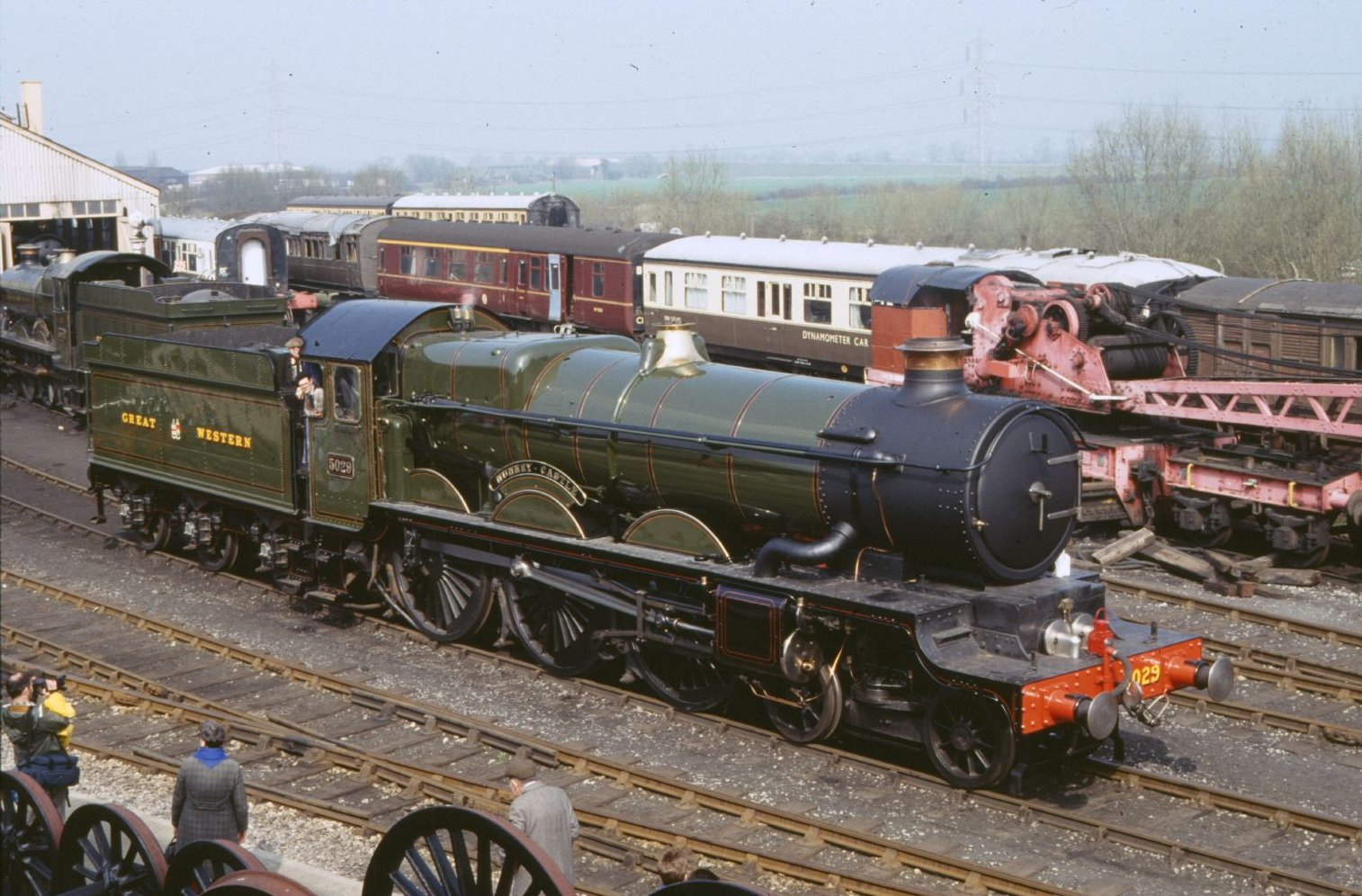
Nunney Castle: Middle Chrome green, orange lining and black frames

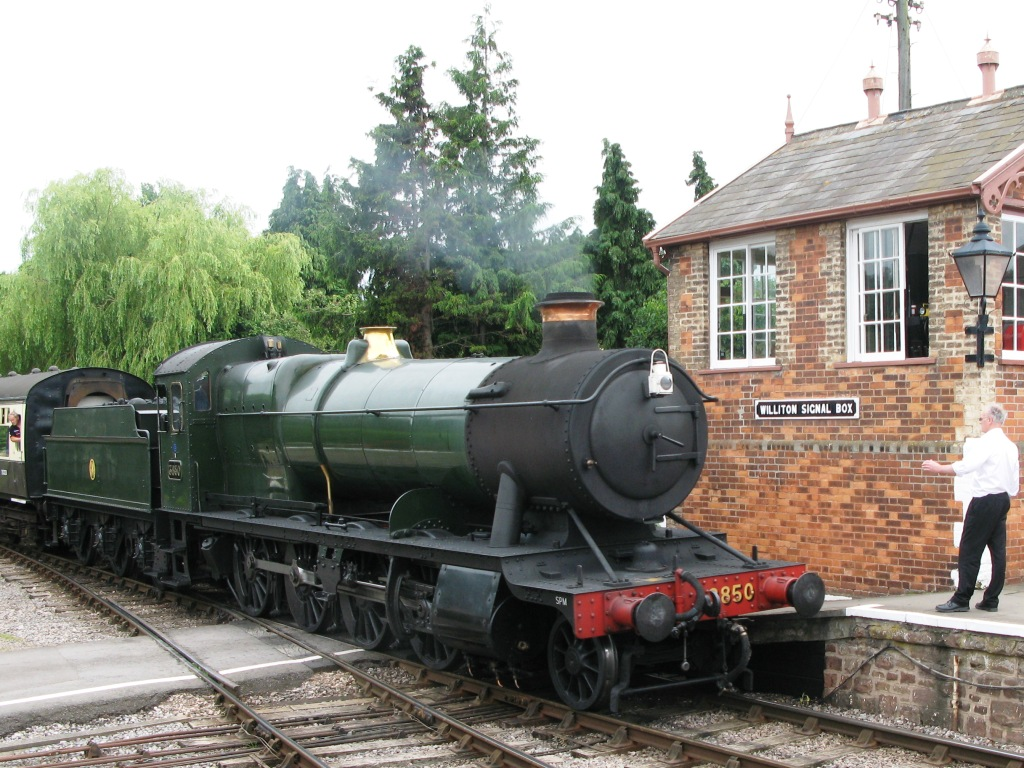
3850: Middle Chrome green, black frames but no lining

=== Carriages ===
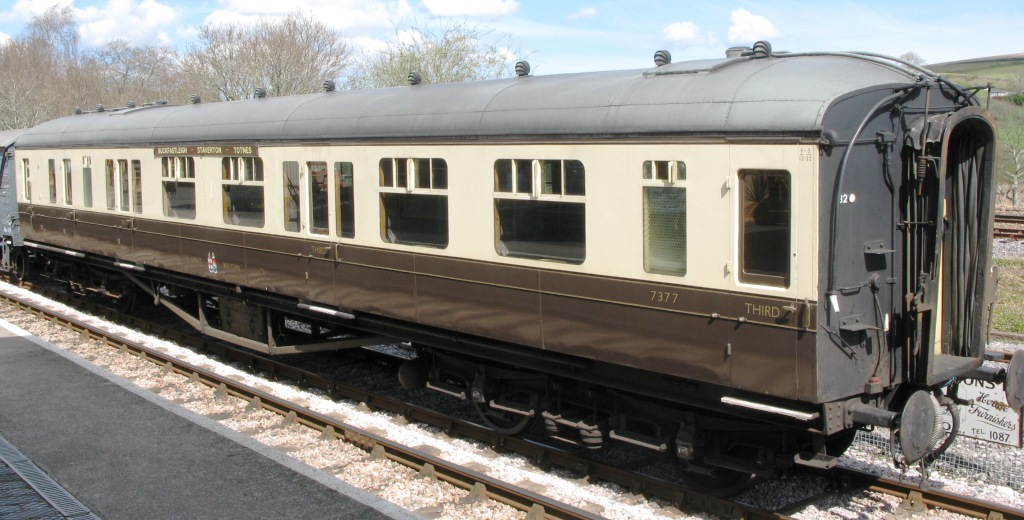
A coach in the chocolate and cream livery used from 1922

GWR passenger coaches were many and varied, ranging from four- and six-wheeled vehicles on the original broad-gauge line of 1838, through to bogie coaches up to 70 feet (21 m) long which were in service through to 1947 and beyond. Vacuum brakes, bogies and through-corridors all came into use during the nineteenth century, and in 1900 the first electrically lit coaches were put into service. The 1920s saw some vehicles fitted with automatic couplings and steel bodies.

Early vehicles were built by a number of independent companies, but in 1844 the railway started to build carriages at Swindon railway works, which eventually provided most of the railway's rolling stock. Special vehicles included sleeping cars, restaurant cars and slip coaches. Passengers were also carried in railmotors, autotrains, and diesel railcars. Passenger-rated vans carried parcels, horses and milk at express speeds. Representative examples of these carriages survive in service today on various Heritage railways up and down the country.

Most coaches were generally painted in variations of a chocolate-brown and cream livery, however they were plain brown or red until 1864 and from 1908 to 1922. Parcels vans and similar vehicles were seldom painted in the two-colour livery, being plain brown or red instead, which caused them to be known as "brown vehicles".

=== Wagons ===
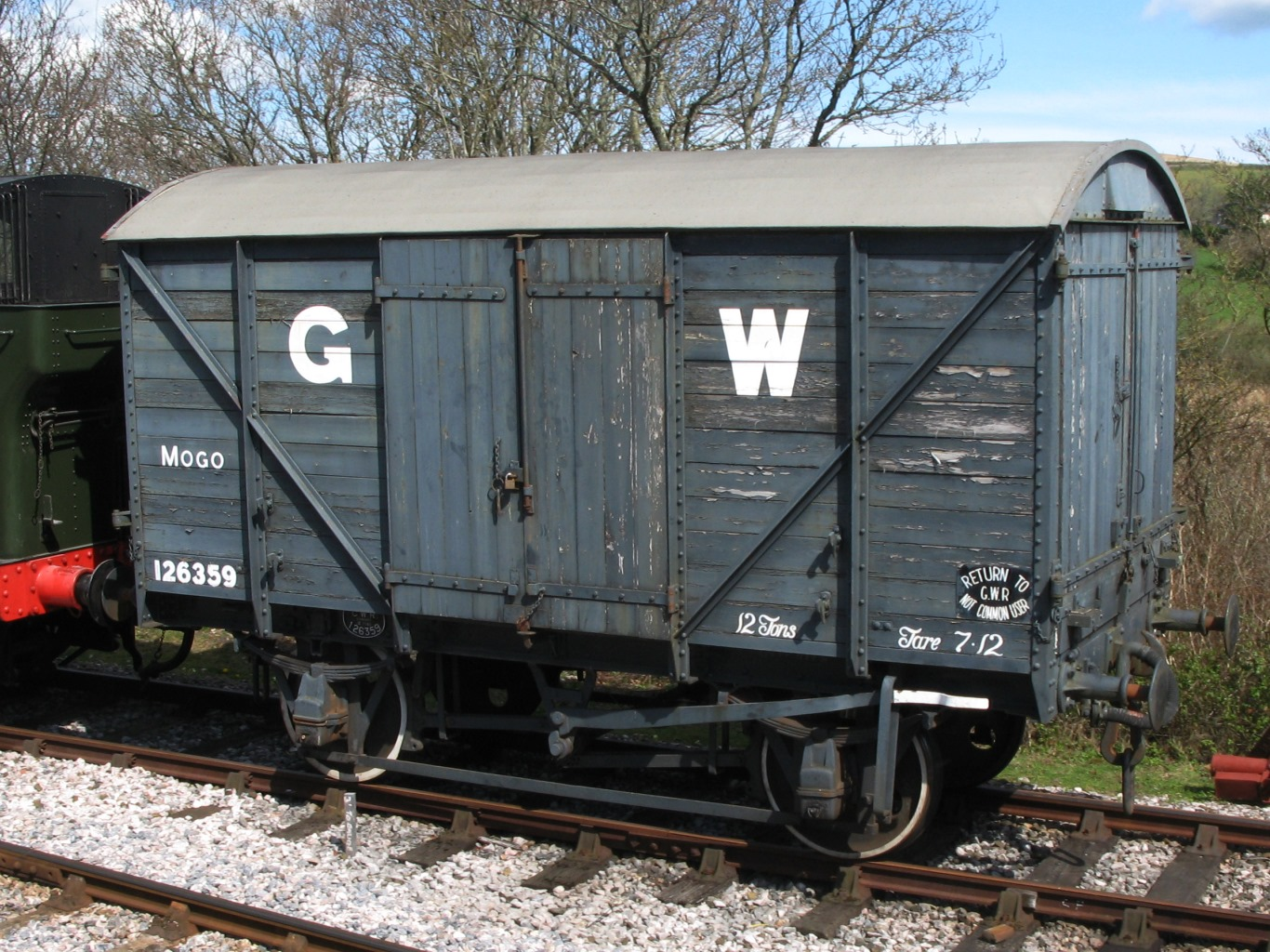
A GWR goods van in the grey livery used from about 1904; this one has end doors to allow motor cars to be loaded

In the early years of the GWR its wagons were painted brown, but this changed to red before the end of the broad gauge. The familiar dark grey livery was introduced about 1904.

Most early wagons were four-wheeled open vehicles, although a few six-wheeled vehicles were provided for special loads. Covered vans followed, initially for carrying cattle but later for both general and vulnerable goods too. The first bogie wagons appeared in 1873 for heavy loads, but bogie coal wagons were built in 1904 following on from the large four-wheel coal wagons that had first appeared in 1898. Rated at 20 tons (20.3 tonnes) these were twice the size of typical wagons of the period, but it was not until 1923 that the company invested heavily in coal wagons of this size and the infrastructure necessary for their unloading at their docks; these were known as "Felix Pole" wagons after the GWR's general manager who promoted their use. Container wagons appeared in 1931 and special vans for motor cars in 1933.

When the GWR was opened no trains in the United Kingdom were fitted with vacuum brakes, instead handbrakes were fitted to individual wagons and trains also conveyed brake vans where a guard had control of a screw-operated brake. The first goods wagons to be fitted with vacuum brakes were those that ran in passenger trains carrying perishable goods such as fish. Some ballast hoppers were given vacuum brakes in December 1903, and general goods wagons were constructed with them from 1904 onwards, although unfitted wagons (those without vacuum brakes) still formed the majority of the fleet in 1948 when the railway was nationalised to become a part of British Railways.

All wagons for public traffic had a code name that was used in telegraphic messages. As this was usually painted onto the wagon it was common to see them referred to by these names, such as "Mink" (a van), "Mica" (refrigerated van), "Crocodile" (boiler truck), and "Toad" (brake van).

== Track ==
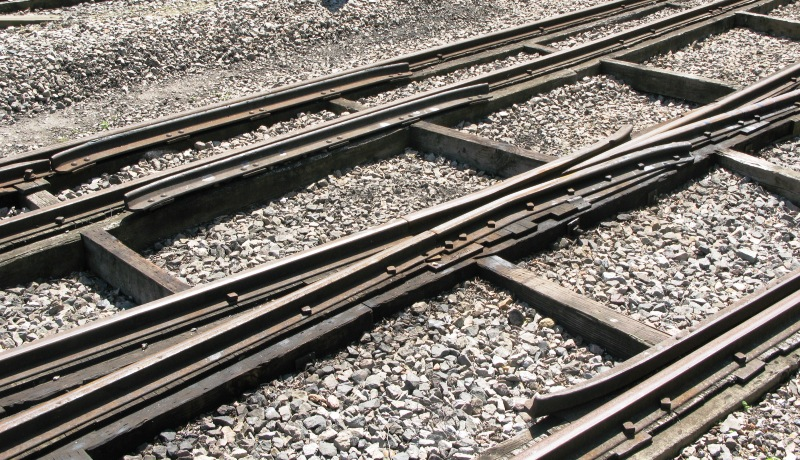
Baulk road track

For the permanent way Brunel decided to use a light bridge rail continuously supported on thick timber baulks, known as "baulk road". Thinner timber transoms were used to keep the baulks the correct distance apart. This produced a smoother track and the whole assembly proved cheaper than using conventional sleepers for broad-gauge track, although this advantage was lost with standard- or mixed-gauge lines because of the higher ratio of timber to length of line. More conventional track forms were later used, although baulk road could still be seen in sidings in the first half of the twentieth century.

== Signalling ==
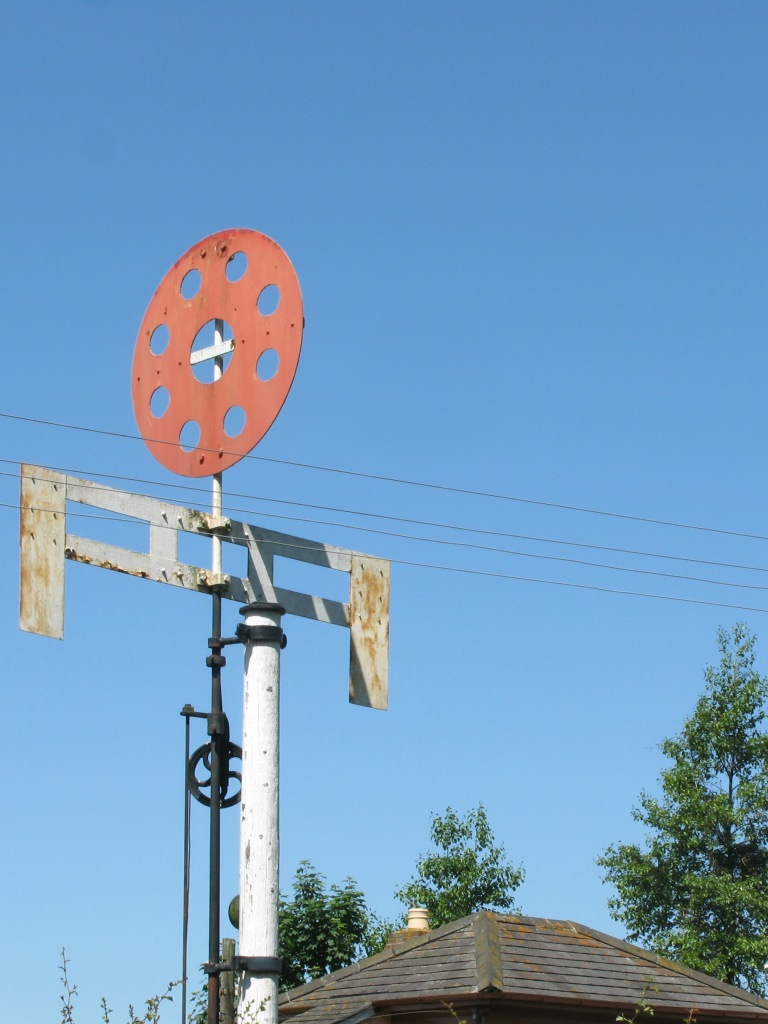
Disc and crossbar signal

Brunel developed a system of "disc and crossbar" signals to control train movements, but the people operating them could only assume that each train reached the next signal without stopping unexpectedly. The world's first commercial telegraph line was installed along the 13 miles (21 km) from Paddington to West Drayton and came into operation on 9 April 1839. This later spread throughout the system and allowed stations to use telegraphic messages to tell the people operating the signals when each train arrived safely. A long list of code words were developed to help make messages both quick to send and clear in meaning.

More conventional semaphore signals replaced the discs and crossbars over time. The GWR persisted with the lower quadrant form, where a "proceed" aspect is indicated by lowering the signal arm, despite other British railways changing to an upper quadrant form. Electric light signals of the "searchlight" pattern were later introduced at busy stations; these could show the same red/green or yellow/green aspects that semaphore signals showed at night. An "automatic train control" system was introduced from 1906 which was a safety system that applied a train's brakes if it passed a danger signal.

== Cultural impact ==
The GWR is known admiringly to some as "God's Wonderful Railway", but jocularly to others as the "Great Way Round" as some of its earliest routes were not the most direct. The railway, however, promoted itself from 1908 as "The Holiday Line" as it carried huge numbers of people to resorts in Wales and south-west England.

=== Tourism ===
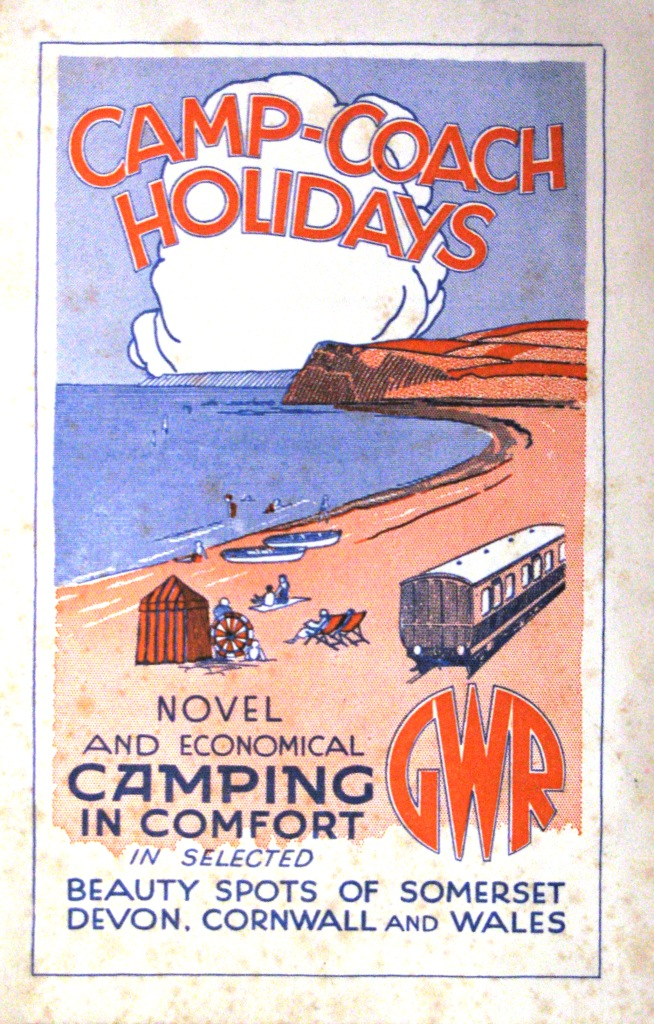
1934 camp coach brochure

Cheap tickets were offered and excursion trains operated to popular destinations and special events such as the 1851 Great Exhibition. Later, GWR road motors operated tours to popular destinations not served directly by train, and its ships offered cruises from places such as Plymouth. Redundant carriages were converted to camp coaches and placed at country or seaside stations such as Blue Anchor and Marazion and hired to holidaymakers who arrived by train.

The GWR had operated hotels at major stations and junctions since the early days, but in 1877 it opened its first "country house hotel", the Tregenna Castle in St Ives, Cornwall. It later added the Fishguard Bay Hotel in Wales and the Manor House at Moretonhampstead, Devon, to which it added a golf course in 1930.

It promoted itself from 1908 as "The Holiday Line through a series of posters, postcards, jigsaw puzzles, and books. These included Holiday Haunts, describing the attraction of the different parts of the GWR system, and regional titles such as S. P. B. Mais's Cornish Riviera and A. M. Bradley's South Wales: The Country of Castles. Guidebooks described the scenery seen Through the Window of their trains. Other GWR books were designed to encourage an interest in the GWR itself. Published as "Books for Boys of All Ages", these included The 10:30 Limited and Loco's of the Royal Road.

The Great Western Railway effectively created the modern day tourist spots of the West Country and the southwest part of Wales that had previously been very difficult to reach. The Bristol Channel resorts of Wales and the West Country such as Minehead or the cliffs of Exmoor had been very remote from other parts of England before the advent of the GWR.

=== Locomotive books ===
Railway enthusiasts were kept informed of new locomotives and other topics through the Great Western Railway Magazine from 1904. In 1911 the GWR became the first company to publish a book about its locomotive stock. Names of Engines was a booklet containing an alphabetic list of the company's named engines, with their number and wheel arrangement. Alternate pages showed formal vignetted photographs of different types of engine, mostly in photographic grey, annotated with their principal dimensions. No author was credited but the list was compiled by Arthur J.L. White in the railway's Chief Mechanical Engineer's Office.

New editions were printed in 1914 and 1917 as Great Western Railway Engines edited by 'A.J.L.W.' and then as Great Western Railway Engines: Names, Numbers, Types and Classes in 1919 with new editions at regular intervals up to 1929. These listed the named engines by class, each class having a formal photograph annotated with extensive dimensions and engineering details. Some classes of unnamed engines were also given a page with a photograph and similar annotations. No author was credited, but the introductory essay "Naming of Locomotives" was signed 'A.J.L.W.' Arthur White died in 1929 and from 1932 new editions, now The G.W.R. Engine Book were published by the GWR's Publicity Department up to 1935.

From 1938 the editor was given as 'W.G.C.' who was W.G. Chapman. The title was now GWR Engines: Names, Numbers Types, Classes, etc. of Great Western Railway Locomotives. There were reprints (also listed as editions) following in 1938 (again) and 1939. A final edition was published in 1946. In addition to the locomotive listings, photographs and dimensions, there are numerous essays on many aspects of GWR locomotive development.

On a related subject, the GWR also published in 1935 a 56-page booklet entitled Swindon Works and its place in Great Western Railway History. Illustrated with photographs on almost every opening, it recounts the history of the GWR as a locomotive-using and building company, the construction and development of Swindon Works, and the training of those employed there. It describes each section of the works, some of the latest locomotives to be built there, and finishes with various related organisations, from the Mechanics' Institution to the Annual Works Holiday.

=== Art, media and literature ===
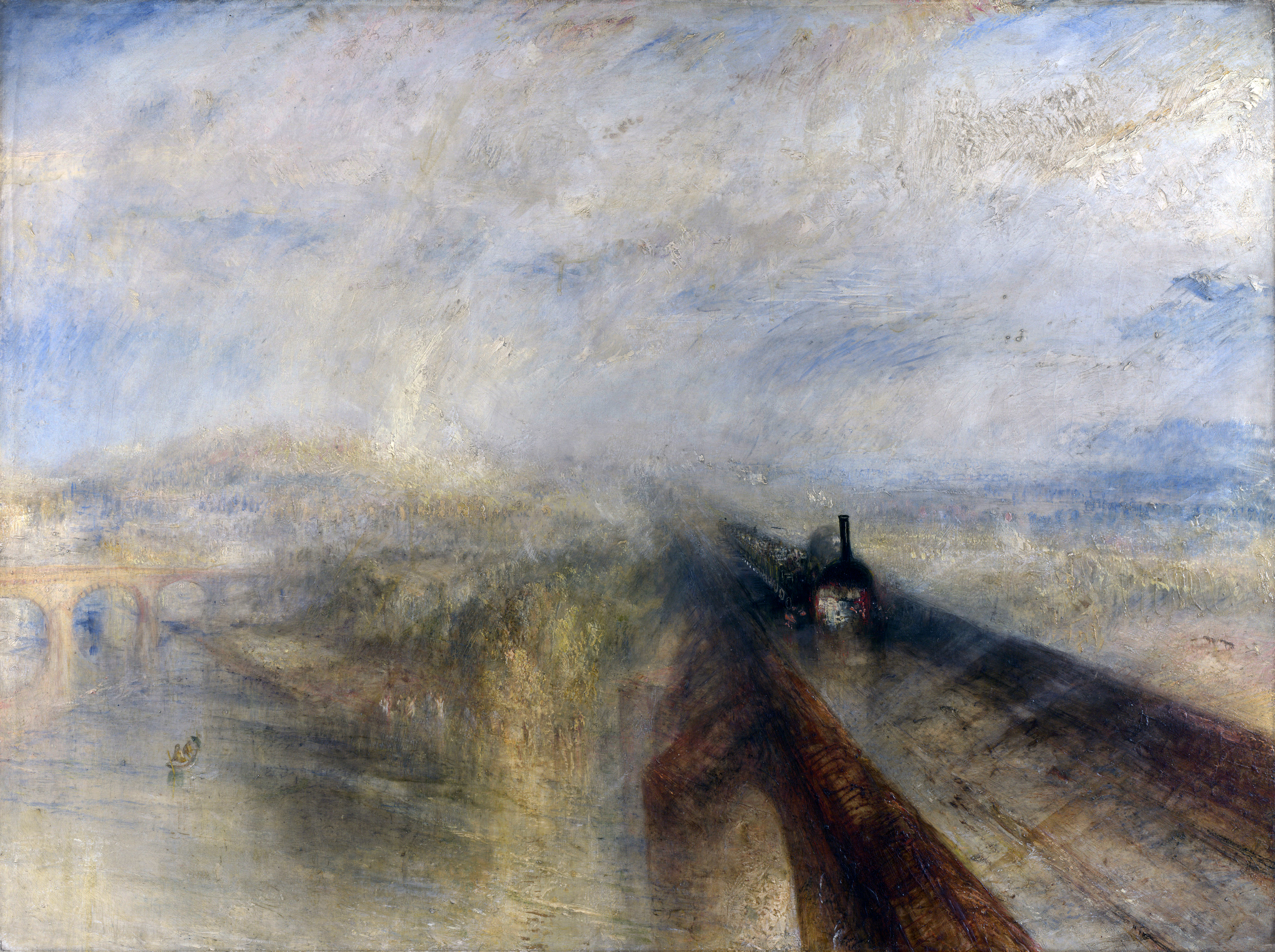
Rain, Steam and Speed - The Great Western Railway, by Turner

The GWR attracted the attention of the artists from an early date. John Cooke Bourne's History and Description of the Great Western Railway was published in 1846 and contained a series of detailed lithographs of the railway that give readers a glimpse of what the line looked like in the days before photography. J. M. W. Turner painted his Rain, Steam and Speed - The Great Western Railway in 1844 after looking out of the window of his train on Maidenhead Railway Bridge, and in 1862 William Powell Frith painted The Railway Station, a large crowd scene on the platform at Paddington. The station itself was initially painted for Powell by W Scott Morton, an architect, and a train was specially provided by the GWR for the painting, in front of which a variety of travellers and railway staff form an animated focal point.

In 1935, as part of the celebration of the centenary of the GWR, the railway commissioned and published Railway Ribaldry, a book of cartoons by W. Heath Robinson, giving that well-known cartoonist a free hand to re-imagine the history of the line for the amusement of its customers. The result is a 96-page softback book with alternating full-page cartoons and smaller vignettes, all on pertinent subjects.

The GWR has featured in many television programmes, such as the BBC children's drama series God's Wonderful Railway in 1980. It was also immortalised in Bob Godfrey's animated film Great, which won the Academy Award for Best Animated Short Film of 1975 which tells the story of Brunel's engineering accomplishments.

Sir John Betjeman mentions the GWR clearly in his poem Distant Views of a Provincial Town:

The old Great Western Railway shakes,
The old Great Western Railway spins –
The old Great Western Railway makes
Me very sorry for my sins.

=== Heritage ===
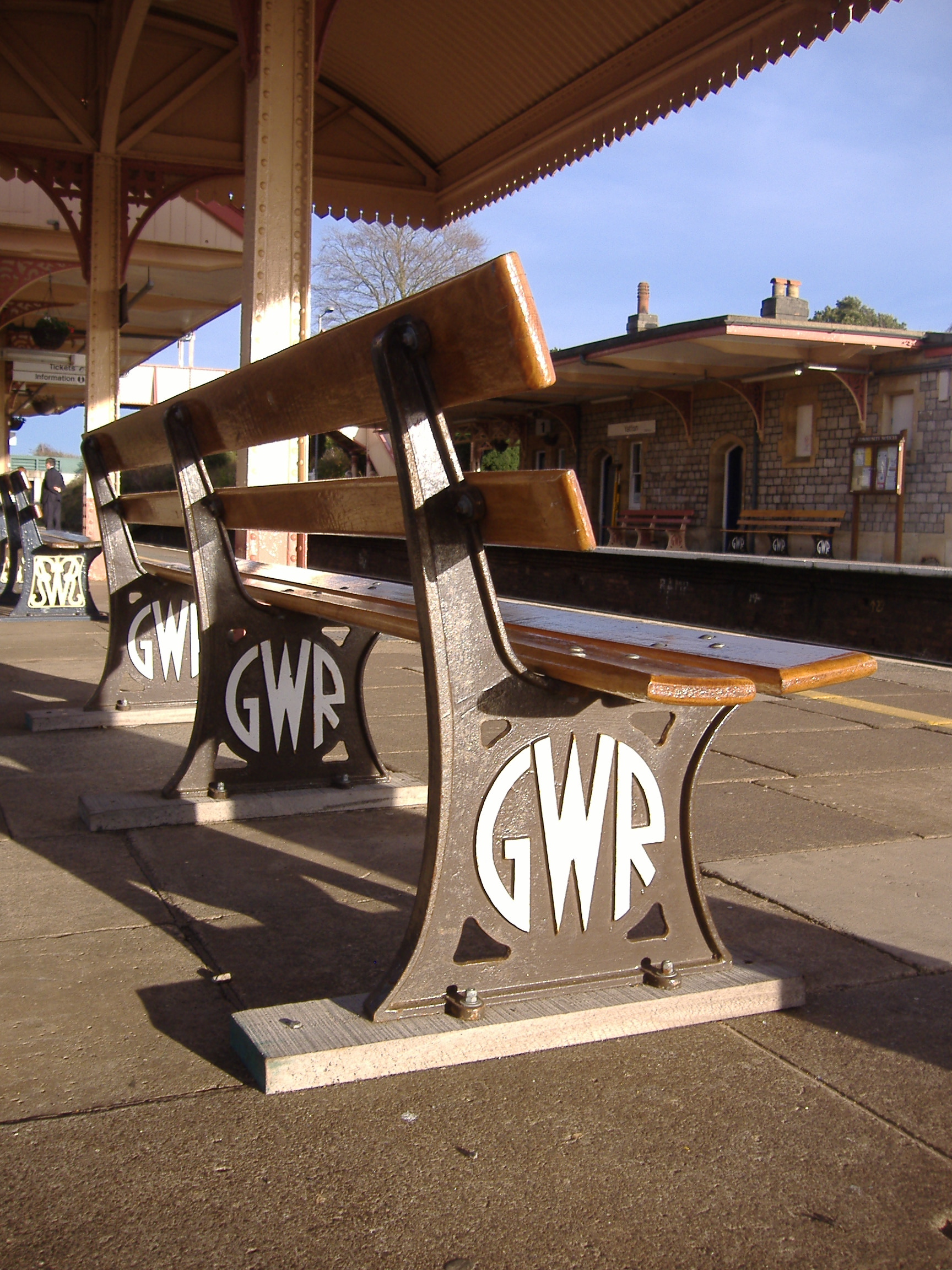
A GWR seat at Yatton

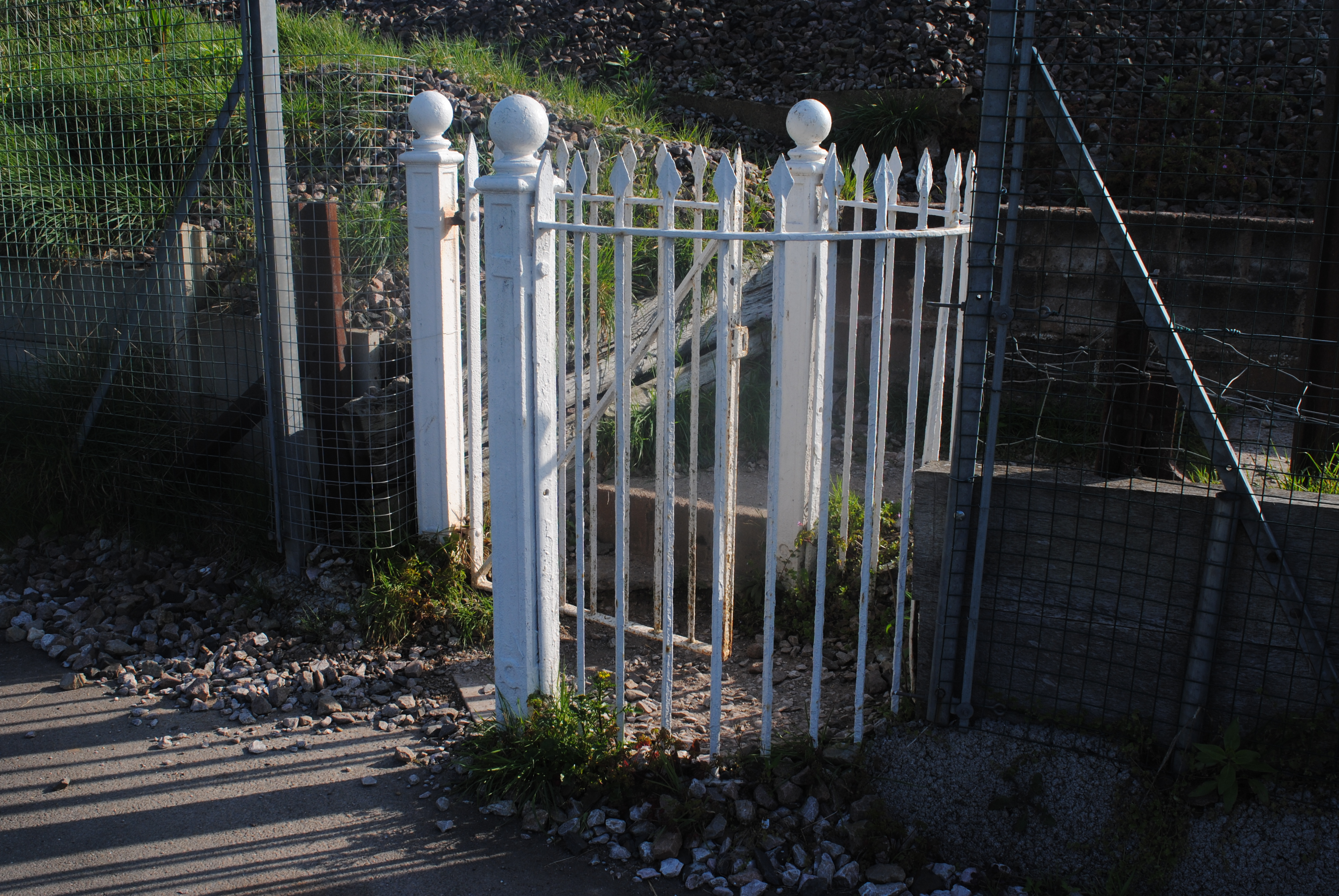
The pedestrian crossing at Cockwood Steps, on the South Devon Main Line, retains a gate with GWR spear-type railings

The GWR's memory is kept alive by several museums such as STEAM – the museum of the GWR (in the old Swindon railway works), and the Didcot Railway Centre where the collection includes replica broad-gauge trains. Preserved GWR lines include those from Totnes to Buckfastleigh, Paignton to Kingswear, Bishops Lydeard to Minehead, Kidderminster to Bridgnorth and Cheltenham to Broadway. Many other heritage railways and museums also have GWR locomotives or rolling stock in use or on display.

Numerous stations owned by Network Rail also continue to display much of their GWR heritage. This is seen not only at the large stations such as Paddington (built 1851, extended 1915) and Temple Meads (1840, 1875 & 1935) but other places such as Bath Spa (1840), Torquay (1878), Penzance (1879), Truro (1897), and Newton Abbot (1927). Many small stations are little changed from when they were opened, as there has been no need to rebuild them to cope with heavier traffic; good examples can be found at Yatton (1841), Frome (1850, Network Rail's last surviving Brunel-style train shed), Bradford-on-Avon (1857), and St Germans (1859). Even where stations have been rebuilt, many fittings such as signs, manhole covers and seats can still be found with "GWR" cast into them.

The Great Western Main Line was considered as a potential UNESCO World Heritage Site in 2006 but rejected in 2011. The proposal comprised seven sites: Temple Meads (including Brunel's GWR offices, boardroom, train shed, the B&ER offices, and the bridge over the River Avon); Bath (including the route from Twerton Tunnel to Sydney Gardens); Middlehill and Box Tunnels; the Swindon area including Swindon railway works and village; Maidenhead Railway Bridge; Wharncliffe Viaduct; and Paddington station.

=== Locomotives named Great Western ===
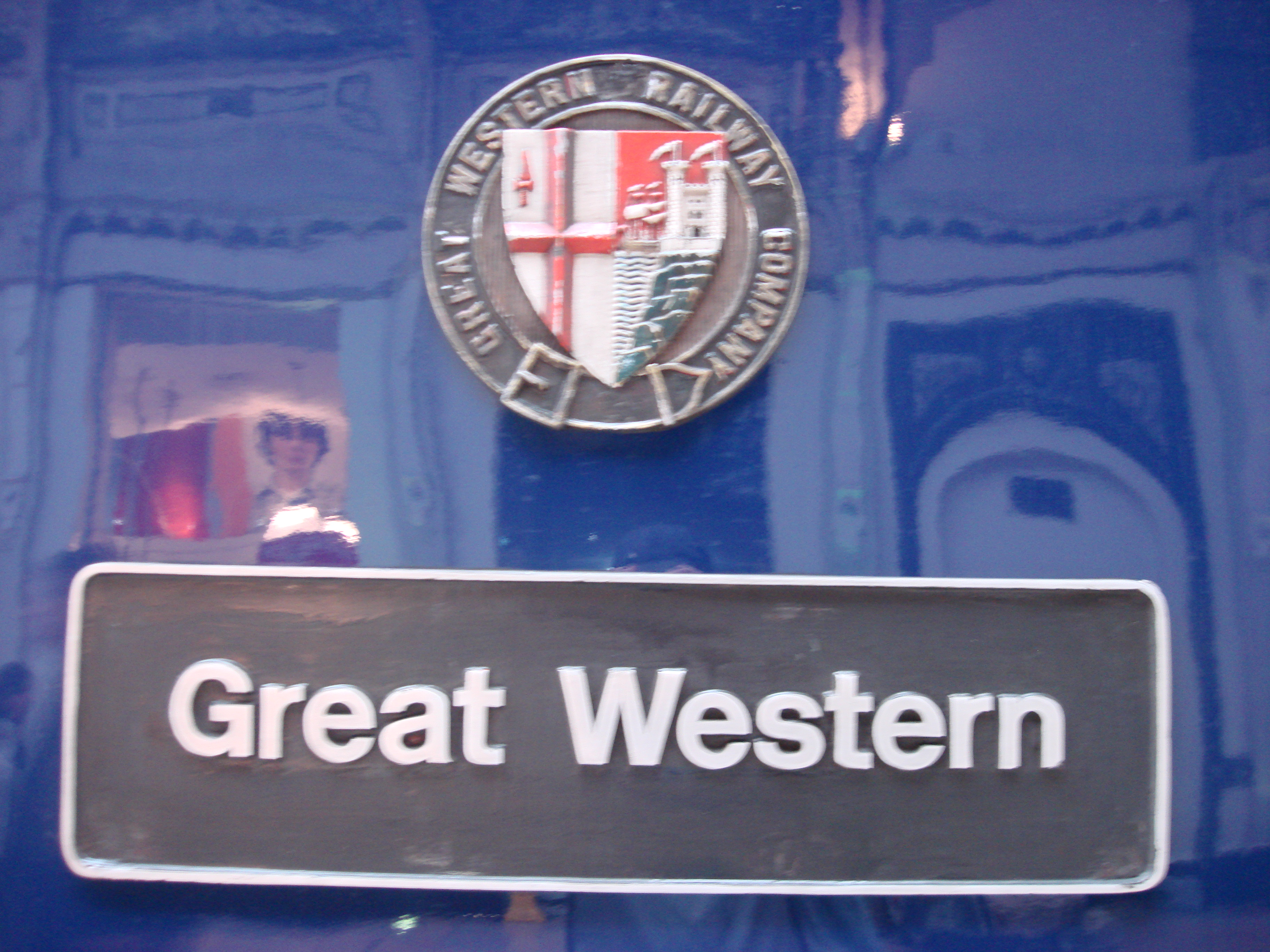
The nameplate on First Great Western power car 43185

Several locomotives have been given the name Great Western. The first was an Iron Duke class broad-gauge locomotive built in 1846, the first locomotive entirely constructed at the company's Swindon Works. This was withdrawn in 1870, but in 1888 a newly built locomotive in the same class was given the same name; this was withdrawn four years later when the broad gauge was taken out of use. A standard-gauge 3031 class locomotive, number 3012, was then given the name. The last GWR locomotive to carry the name was Castle class number 7007, which continued to carry it in British Railways days.

The name later reappeared on some BR diesels. The first was 47500 which carried the name from 1979 until 1991. Another Class 47, this time 47815, had the name bestowed on it in 2005; it is currently (2009) in operation with Riviera Trains. High Speed Train power car number 43185 also carried the same name and was operated by the modern Great Western Railway until 18 May 2019.

== Notable people ==
=== Chairmen ===
*Benjamin Shaw 1835–1837[162]

- William Sims 1837–1839
- Charles Russell 1839–1855
- Spencer Horatio Walpole 1855–1856
- William Barrington, 6th Viscount Barrington 1856–1857
- Frederick Ponsonby, 6th Earl of Bessborough 1857–1859
- Henry Petty-Fitzmaurice, 4th Marquess of Lansdowne 1859–1863
- Spencer Horatio Walpole 1863
- Richard Potter 1863–1865
- Daniel Gooch 1865–1889
- Frederick Saunders 1889–1895
- Frederick Campbell, 3rd Earl Cawdor 1895–1905
- Alfred Baldwin 1905–1908
- Victor Spencer, 1st Viscount Churchill 1908–1934
- Robert Horne, 1st Viscount Horne of Slamannan 1934–1940
- Charles Jocelyn Hambro 1940–1945
- Viscount Portal 1945–1948

=== General Managers ===
- James Grierson 1863–1887 (Goods Manager 1857–1863)
- Henry Lambert 1887–1896 (Previously Chief Goods Manager. Responsible for managing the final gauge conversion in 1892.)
- Sir Joseph Wilkinson 1896–1903
- James Charles Inglis 1903–1911 (formerly Chief Engineer)
- Frank Potter 1911–1919
- Charles Adlington 1919–1921 (formerly Superintendent of the Line)
- Sir Felix Pole 1921–1929 (he oversaw the Grouping of the South Wales railways into the GWR following the Railways Act 1921, and promoted the use of 20 ton wagons to bring efficiencies to the railway's coal trade.)
- James Milne 1929–1947 (he saw the GWR through World War II.)

=== Superintendents of the line ===
In January 1864, the Chairman of the GWR, Richard Potter, defined a new role in the company, "Superintendent of the Line", whose duties were to "conduct the passenger business of the Railway". He proposed George Nugent Tyrrell for this role. The position of "Superintendent of the Line" continued in the GWR until nationalisation.

- George Nugent Tyrrell 1864–1888
- Nathan James Burlinson 1888–1894
- Thomas Isaac Allen 1894–1904
- Joseph Morris 1904–1910
- Charles Adlington 1911–1919 (afterwards General Manager)
- Richard Howell Nicholls 1919–1932
- H.L. Wilkinson 1932–1936
- Frank Rowe Potter 1936–1940
- Gilbert Matthews 1941–1948

=== Chief Engineers, Locomotive Superintendents, CMEs ===
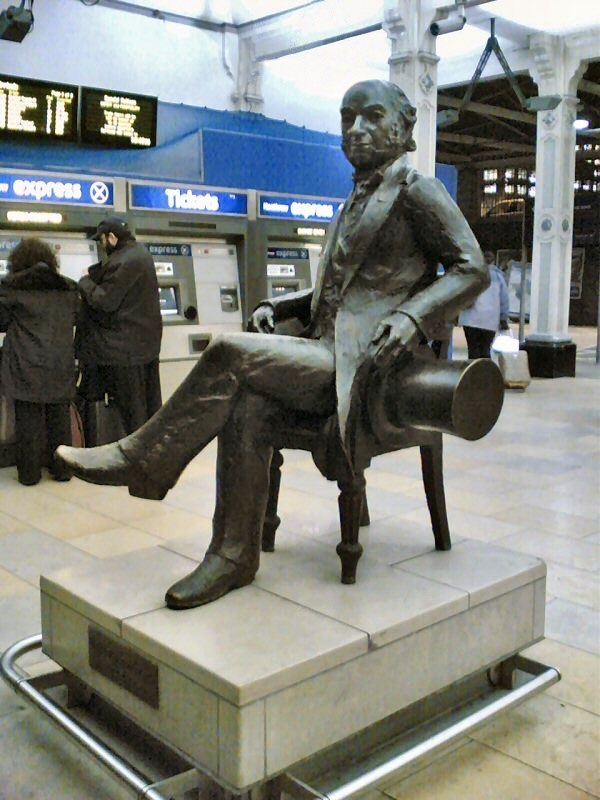
Isambard Kingdom Brunel's statue at Paddington station

Chief Engineer

- Isambard Kingdom Brunel - (1835–1859) Also engineered many of the broad-gauge lines with which the GWR amalgamated, and the standard-gauge Taff Vale Railway. He was responsible for choosing the route of the railway and designing many of today's iconic structures including Box Tunnel, Royal Albert Bridge, Maidenhead Railway Bridge, Paddington and Bristol Temple Meads stations.
- T.H. Bertram 1859–1860
- Michael Lane 1860–1868
- William George Owen 1868–1885
- William Lancaster Owen 1885–1891 (son of William George Owen)
- Louis Trench 1891–1892
- James Inglis 1892–1903
- William Grierson 1903–1923
- John Christian Lloyd 1923–1929 (jointly with William Waddell from 1923–1925)
- William Waddell 1923–1925 (jointly with John Christian Lloyd)
- Raymond Carpmael 1929–1939
- Allan Quartermaine 1940–1948.

Locomotive Superintendent

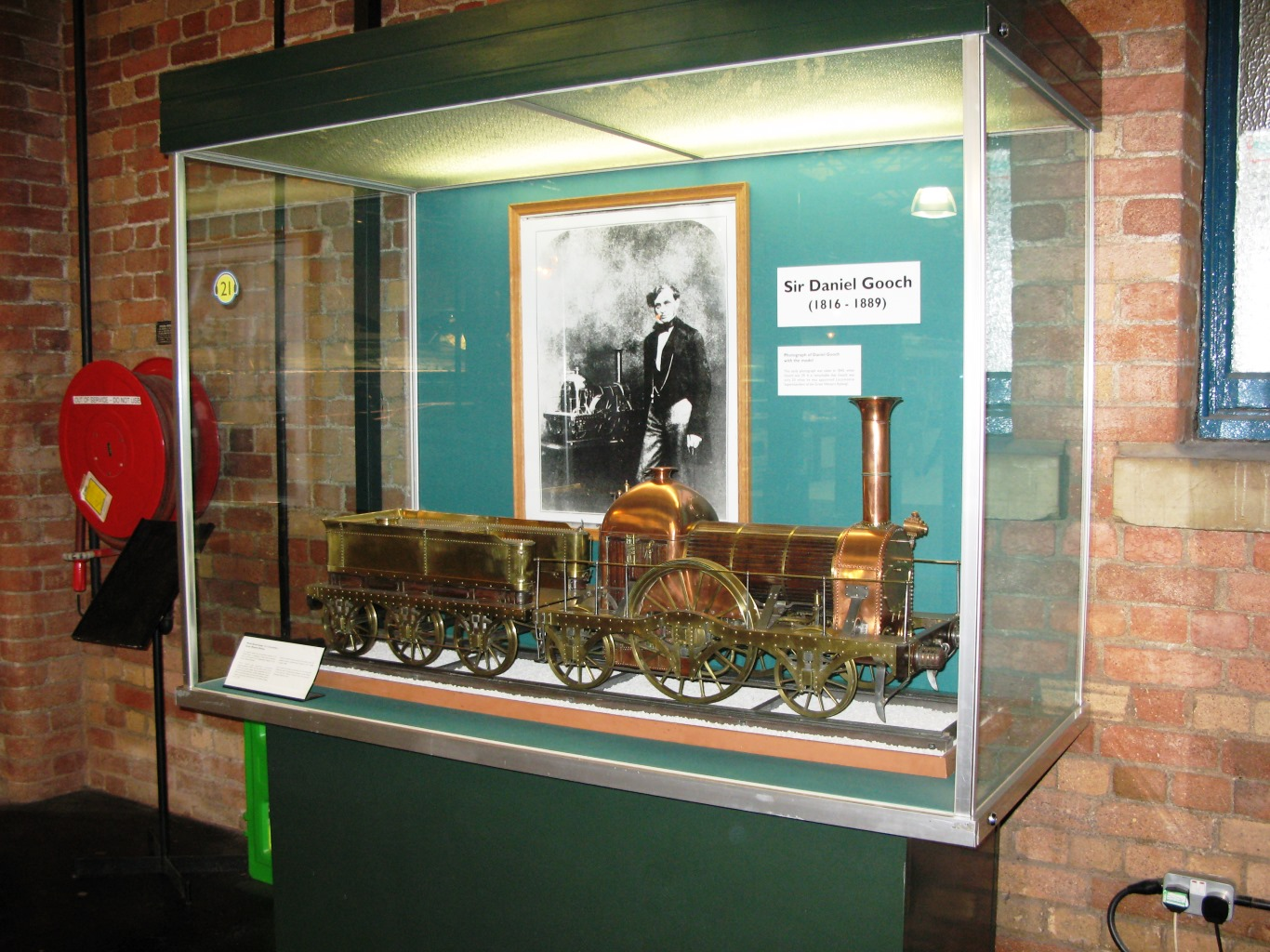
A display commemorating Daniel Gooch at the National Railway Museum

- Daniel Gooch - (1837–1864) Later the chairman (1865–1889). He was responsible for the railway's early locomotive successes, such as the Iron Duke Class, and for establishing Swindon railway works.
- Joseph Armstrong - (1864–1877) Locomotive Superintendent to the Shrewsbury and Chester Railway and the Shrewsbury and Birmingham Railways from 1853, he was responsible for the locomotive workshops at Wolverhampton. When they amalgamated with the GWR the following year he was given the title of Northern Division Locomotive Superintendent (1854–1864), he then moved to Swindon as the chief Locomotive Superintendent.
- William Dean - (1877–1902).
- George Jackson Churchward - (1902–1915) who instigated much standardisation of locomotive components.

Chief Mechanical Engineer

- George Jackson Churchward - (1915–1921) The position was renamed.
- Charles Collett - (1922–1941).
- Frederick Hawksworth - (1941–1947) The last GWR Chief Mechanical Engineer.

=== Others ===
- George Armstrong, brother of Joseph, and Superintendent of the Northern Division (1864–1897) at Wolverhampton works, which he ran almost independently of Swindon.
- Charles Spagnoletti - The GWR's Telegraph Superintendent (1855–1892) patented the Disc Block Telegraph Instrument that was used to safely control the dispatch of trains. First used on the Metropolitan Railway in 1863 and the Bristol and South Wales Union Railway in 1864, it was later used on many other lines operated by the company.

A number of engineers trained at or worked for the GWR, before moving to other companies, including:

- Thomas Russell Crampton (SER among others)
- Harold Holcroft (SECR, SR),
- James Holden (GER)
- William Martley (LCDR)
- John G. Robinson (WL&WR, GCR)
- William Stanier (LMS)
- William Stroudley (HR, LBSCR)
- Archibald Sturrock (GNR)

== See also ==
- Chiltern Railways, Great Western Railway and Transport for Wales – Current train operators on routes built by the Great Western Railway
- Great Western Railway accidents
- Great Western Railway ships
- Great Western Railway telegraphic codes
- GWR locomotive numbering and classification
- List of 7-foot gauge railway locomotive names
- List of Chief Mechanical Engineers of the Great Western Railway
- List of constituents of the Great Western Railway
- Llanelli railway strike
