= William George Owen =

British civil engineer (1810–1885)

- Born: 25 October 1810
- Died: 13 May 1885 (aged 74)
- Occupation: Civil engineer

Bridge over Afon Seiont in Caernarfon. "Erected 1835, W. G. Owen, Contractor"

William George Owen (25 October 1810 – 13 May 1885) was a British civil engineer primarily with the Great Western Railway.

== Career ==
Born in Caernarfon on 25 October 1810 to a family of shopkeepers, he attended school in Malpas, Cheshire before being apprenticed to surveyor George Hennet, then engaged on a map of Lancashire. He returned to Caernarfon to set up on his own as a surveyor and civil engineer. He won a tender from the County Justices and Turnpike Trust to build a new bridge over Afon Seiont, then within a year he himself designed a bridge, this time for the Anglesey Justices at Cefn Coch near Beaumaris. During this time he collaborated again with Hennet to survey a potential railway route from Porthdinllaen to London, a line which was never built. His next contract in North Wales was to build a new line of road for the Caernarfonshire Turnpike Trust between Bangor, Gwynedd and Aberpwll, a level road along the valley bottoms instead of the older road which had climbed hills. This road largely still exists as part of the A4087 and B4547.

Just as Owen was beginning on the Bangor road contract, he received a letter from Isambard Kingdom Brunel, on Hennet's recommendation, inviting him to come and work for him building the Great Western Railway. Owen complied, and was engaged with Brunel building the Maidenhead Railway Bridge while also completing the North Wales contract. He went on to work on the construction and, later, maintenance of the Box Tunnel. He soon became the Chief Engineer of the South Wales Railway, then a separate company, then after merger with the Great Western the Resident Engineer for a larger region based at Gloucester. His responsibilities grew until in 1868 he became Chief Engineer of the entire Great Western Railway, based at Paddington. During his time, he oversaw the conversion from Broad Gauge to Standard Gauge and a move from iron to steel rails.

Owen retired as Chief Engineer in March 1885. No successor was appointed immediately, but his son William Lancaster Owen took over responsibility for new civil engineering works. Another son Sir Herbert Isambard Owen was instrumental in the founding of the University of Wales, and served as its first deputy chancellor.

Professional and academic associations
Preceded by Michael Lane	Chief Engineer of the Great Western Railway; 1885–1891	Succeeded by William Lancaster Owen
