= Charles Spagnoletti =

English inventor and telegraph superintendent

- Born: Charles Ernest Paolo della Diana Spagnoletti; 12 July 1832; Brompton, London
- Died: 28 June 1915 (aged 82); Hampstead, London
- Education: Blemmell House School
- Occupations: Telegraph Superintendent and inventor
- Years active: 1855–1892
- Employer: Great Western Railway
- Spouse: Caroline Charlotte Duffield (1829–1903)

Charles Ernest Spagnoletti MInstCE, MIEE (12 July 1832 – 28 June 1915) was an electrical inventor and the first telegraph superintendent of the Great Western Railway (GWR). He also advised various railway companies on the use of electricity, signalling, and telegraphy.

== Early life ==
Charles Ernest Paolo della Diana Spagnoletti was born in Brompton, London on 12 July 1832. He was the eldest child of Ernesto and Charlotte (née Stohwasser) Spagnoletti. He was educated at Blemmell House School, Brompton. Ernesto Spagnoletti was descended from the noble Sardinian della Diana family. His own father, Paolo, had been a popular musician in London and had been given the inaccurate nickname "Spagnoletto" - the "little Spaniard" - by his admirers. Two generations later, Charles Ernest was given the surname Diana-Spagnoletti.

== Career ==
At the age of fourteen, Spagnoletti started work at the National Debt Office. He soon started studying with Alexander Bain, inventor and engineer, and worked with him on a printing telegraph. He joined the Electric Telegraph Company in 1847, travelling around the country and setting up and managing new telegraphy stations.

In 1855, at the age of 23, he joined the GWR, becoming the first Telegraph Superintendent of the company. He set about developing a complete system of block signalling using telegraphy, supported by a book of rules and instructions. This system was first applied on the Metropolitan and District railway, followed soon by the GWR, whose Chairman, Daniel Gooch, disapproved of mechanical safety devices, claiming that they reduced the "natural vigilance" of the operating staff. On the GWR, Spagnoletti's block telegraph instrument was particularly useful on single-track lines where it allowed more trains to be run. It became the foundation of all block signalling used on almost all British railways, and on the railways of many other countries. In 1866 Spagnoletti devised a system of communication between passengers and the guards of a train, consisting of a handle which a passenger could turn in the compartment in which they were travelling. This activated a system of alarm bells in the train and also caused a red disc to be shown on the outside of the carriage in which the alarm had been used. He continued to develop various devices and inventions applicable to signalling and railways, and also in other areas such as fire safety.

After retiring as Telegraph Superintendent of the GWR in 1892 (following a long illness), he was appointed as Consulting Electrical Engineer for the railway. In 1893 Spagnoletti became managing director of the Phonopore Company. The phonopore system had been in use since 1885 and allowed telephone calls in addition to telegraphy over an existing telegraph cable.

Throughout his career Spagnoletti acted in various advisory roles. He was consulting engineer for a number of railway companies (Metropolitan and District, City and South London, and Central London), and also the London Electric Omnibus Company. After the Telegraph Act 1868 (which enabled the nationalisation of telegraph companies in the UK), Spagnoletti advised the government on compensation due to the companies involved. He was on the organising committee or jury, or both, for the electrical sections of various international exhibitions including the Paris World's Fair (1878), the first International Exposition of Electricity (Paris 1881), the International Health Exhibition (London, 1884), the International Inventions Exhibition (London, 1885), and the Chicago World's Fair (1893).

In 1874, Spagnoletti's views on contemporary signalling developments were recorded during a discussion of a paper, "On the fixed signals of railways" by R.C. Rapier read before members of the Institution of Civil Engineers on 31 March of that year:

The marvellous increase of railway traffic, and the amount of the earnings of railways for the last ten years were a proof of how much had been gained by mechanical and electrical assistance in working them; and how the carrying capacity of the lines had been stretched and expanded by appliances of this kind; and at a comparatively small outlay, with such great results...

...Seeing that mechanical [signalling] appliances had done so much in these respects, [Spagnoletti] considered that any brought forward possessing desirable improvements deserved a fair trial.

Prejudice, generally found to be the want of a better knowledge and comprehension of any object or thing, was an awkward and difficult barrier to get over; but had not the experience of past inventions (some of which were now admitted to be quite necessary) shown how long it took to introduce and get existing ones into use.

=== Inventions and developments ===
In the early days of telegraphy it was found that the effects of telluric currents and lightning strikes could have an adverse effect on the permanent magnets used in the needles used to display signals. The permanent magnet was surrounded by a coil of wire which carried the signal, causing the needle to deflect. A strong current in the telegraph cable, arising from external sources such as a lightning strike, could weaken the permanent magnet and occasionally reverse the direction of the magnetic field. The "false reversal" of telegraph signals used in railway signalling presented a great danger. In the Spagnoletti Induced Needle, patented in 1869, the permanent magnet was replaced with a soft iron core which was magnetised by induction by a strong permanent magnet well away from the coil of wire. Although the needle would be deflected by a surge of current, the magnet would not be weakened or its polarity reversed.

In 1862 Spagnoletti patented and produced the Spagnoletti disc block instrument, first used on the Metropolitan Railway when it opened in 1863, and which soon became standard on the GWR.

In this block instrument, a disc, instead of a telegraph needle, oscillated between a pair of electromagnets to indicate "line clear" or "train on line" in a window at the bottom of the instrument's face. The indication "line blocked", the default position for block instruments, was displayed through one half of each of the other two indications being displayed in the window. Each indication was obtained by pressing on a key which was held down by a wire frame passing over the key shank (see illustration). This type of instrument survived in use beyond the end of the GWR in 1948, and into the 21st century. The final operational Network Rail example, located in Banbury South signal box was finally decommissioned at 02:00 on 30 July 2016 shortly before the box's demolition.

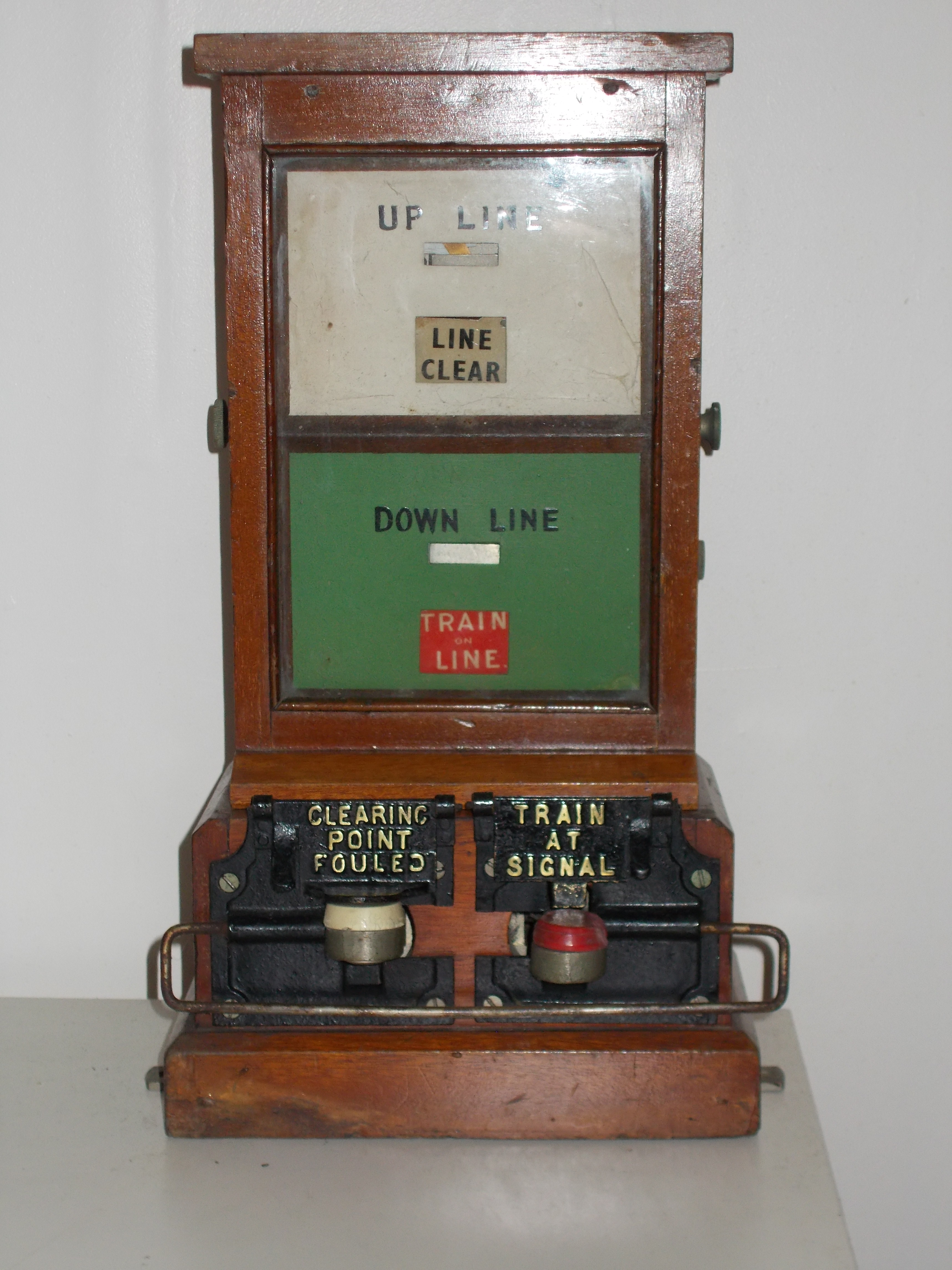
A Spagnoletti block telegraph instrument.The red and white keys were "pegged" or secured to give a "Train on Line" or "Line Clear" indication.

He also developed a repeater for semaphore signals (where the status of signals not directly visible from the signal box could be displayed) and a semaphore signal lamp checker (warning if the light of a signal was extinguished). He also introduced electric lighting at a number of stations, including Paddington. He designed a portable telegraph machine, which was always carried on Queen Victoria's royal train, in case of breakdown or emergency. The machine was under Spagnoletti's care so he always travelled on the royal train.

Spagnoletti also designed a results board for Ascot racecourse, and a town fire alarm, used in a number of London streets, that was regarded as being as effective as it was ugly.

His talents extended to inventing a system of road construction using interlocking blocks of precast concrete laid on a bed of compressed sand and bound together with molten pitch. This method was adopted by the London County Council.

=== Society of Telegraph Engineers ===
Charles Spagnoletti was an early member of the Society of Telegraph Engineers (formed in 1871), joining in 1872. The society became the Society of Telegraph Engineers and Electricians in 1880, with Spagnoletti as president in 1885, and then became the Institution of Electrical Engineers in 1889. Spagnoletti was also a member of the Institution of Civil Engineers, the Physical Society of London, the Royal Society of Arts, and the Imperial Institute.

== Family life ==
Like his father and grandfather, Spagnoletti was also musically gifted and wrote and composed songs. He had a good tenor voice which was put to good use when Sir William Preece demonstrated the first Edison phonograph in London in 1878. Spagnoletti recorded a song and the national anthem.

Spagnoletti married Caroline Charlotte Duffield (1829–1903), a widow, in 1853. They had three daughters and two sons. His brother (Charles), son (James), great-nephew (Philip), and Philip's son (Robert) all pursued careers in electricity.

Spagnoletti died of pneumonia on 28 June 1915 at Hampstead and was buried at Hampstead Cemetery.
