= George Nugent Tyrrell =

British rail official (b. 1816, d. 1893)

George Nugent Tyrrell (13 April 1816 – 12 July 1893) was a key figure in the development of the Great Western Railway in England and Wales.

== Early life ==
George Nugent Tyrrell was born to John Tyrrell, private secretary to Sir George Nugent, and his wife Clarissa (née Merle) in London.

The family moved to Sidmouth in 1823, and Tyrrell attended Mount Radford School in Exeter. At the age of 16, he suffered a long illness and, in order to aid recovery, at the age of 21 he travelled to New South Wales for an "outdoor life".

After a drought and commercial depression, he returned to England and started his railway career as the stationmaster for the Great Western Railway in Keynsham in 1842, and by 1848 was a Superintendent based in Cirencester, Gloucester, Paddington, and then finally the Northern Division at Shrewsbury, and Chester.

== Superintendent of the Line ==
In January 1864, the Chairman of the GWR, Richard Potter, defined a new role in the company, "Superintendent of the Line", whose duties were to "conduct the passenger business of the Railway". He proposed George Nugent Tyrrell for this role.

Early in the role, Tyrrell looked to improve reliability, and this involved increasing scheduled journey times for some fast servies. Journey times between London and Birmingham increasing between 5-10 minutes. Tyrrell planned the new services through the Severn Tunnel which opened in 1886.

Despite being initially a passenger-focused role, Tyrrell became involved in all aspects of train operation, including deployment of Telegraph Block Signalling, and gathering information on all accidents.

Tyrrell held the position for 24 years, retiring in June 1888.

The position of "Superintendent of the Line" continued in the GWR until nationalisation.

Professional and academic associations
Preceded by New Position	Superintendent of the Line of the Great Western Railway; 1894–1904	Succeeded by Nathan James Burlinson
