= Retired Railway Officers' Society =

Retired Railway Officers’ Society
- Formation: November 12, 1901; 124 years ago
- Founder: Edmund Bachelor Ivatts
- Location: London, United Kingdom
- Fields: Railway Management and Operation
- Website: rros.org.uk

The Retired Railway Officers’ Society was founded in 1901.

== History ==
A preliminary meeting to discuss the formation of the society took place at the Railway Clearing House on 12 November 1901. Edmund Bachelor Ivatts who had been retired for 10 years obtained support from 24 retired railway officers with the objective of setting up an association for senior officers of the rail industry. On 1 July 1902 a meeting took place which established the society formally, and Joseph Metcalfe was voted as chairman. Membership was open to those who had worked in the rail industry of any company based in British or the British Empire.

The first committee comprised Joseph Metcalfe as chairman, with Messrs Neele (London and North Western Railway), Johnson (Great Northern Railway), Medcalf (Great Northern Railway), O’Connell (Bombay Baroda and Central India Railway) and Stephens (Great Western Company).

The organisation was headed by Joseph Metcalfe as chairman until 1910 when it was agreed to elect a president when George Potter Neele of the London and North Western Railway was selected.

By 1916 the membership had grown to 50 and for ordinary members the entrance fee and annual subscription was one guinea (equivalent to £79 in 2025) and for associate members 10s 6d (equivalent to £38 in 2025).

== Member Portraits ==
Starting in 1909 on the initiative of Alfred Powell of the Metropolitan Railway, Member Portraits were published periodically in volumes with photographs and details of the careers of members.

Vol	Page	Name	Role	Company	Year entered service	Year ended service
1	1	Edmund Bachelor Ivatts	Goods Manager	Midland Great Western Railway of Ireland	1851	1891
1	2	Josiah Medcalf	Outdoor Goods Manager	Great Northern Railway	1851	1897
1	3	John O’Connell	Chief Auditor and Accountant	Bombay, Baroda and Central India Railway	1847	1896
1	4	Nathan James Burlinson	Superintendent of the Line	Great Western Railway	1850	1894
1	5	James Craik	Manager	Central Argentine Railway	1848	1896
1	6	David Stevenson	London Traffic Superintendent	London and North Western Railway	1837	1890
1	7	Charles Henry Chapman	Chief Goods Manager	London Chatham and Dover Railway	1848	1898
1	8	Harold Copperthwaite	Engineer Southern Division	North Eastern Railway	1874	1899
1	9	Mortimer Harris	Manager	London Chatham and Dover Railway	1840	1887
1	10	Edward William Keily	Deputy Traffic (Coaching) Manager	Great Indian Peninsula Railway	1855	1899
1	11	George Potter Neele	Superintendent of the Line	London and North Western Railway	1845	1895
1	12	Robert Pauling	Chief Goods Manager	North Eastern Railway	1849	1892
1	13	James Stephens	District Goods manager, Manchester, Lancashire & West Riding Division	Great Western Railway	1848	1893
1	14	Jacob Wait	Secretary & Accountant	London and North Western Railway and Great Western Railway Joint Committee	1849	1896
1	15	George Byland Roche MICE	Chief Engineer	London, Chatham and Dover Railway	1851	1898
1	16	Fred White Read	Traffic Manager	Midland Railway	1873	1901
1	17	Richard Johnson	Chief Engineer	Great Northern Railway	1847	1898
1	18	Frank Grundy	Vice President	Quebec Central Railway	1850	1905
1	19	Edmund Andrews MICE	Resident Engineer	London and South Western Railway	1857	1901
1	20	John Alexander	Superintendent of the Line	Great Northern Railway	1861	1902
1	21	William Henry Newman	Chief Accountant	North Staffordshire Railway	1847	1896
1	22	Alfred Powell	General Manager	Metropolitan District Railway	1854	1902
1	23	Thomas Toon Young	Assistant Goods Manager	Great Northern Railway	1857	1902
1	24	William Latta	Secretary	Great Northern Railway	1856	1902
1	25	William Henry Elwell JP	Surveyor Estate Agent	Great Northern Railway	1881	1903
1	26	Albert Guille	Chief Accountant	Great Northern Railway	1857	1903
1	27	Edward Thomas	Assistant Accountant	Great Northern Railway	1870	1903
1	28	Frederick Boswell Kelly	District Superintendent Cambridge	Great Northern Railway	1849	1904
1	29	William Jones	Secretary	Metropolitan District Railway	1866	1904
1	30	Henry George Drury MVO	Superintendent of the Line	Great Eastern Railway	1854	1904
2	31	Charles Temprel	Statistical Officer	Great Northern Railway	1858	1904
2	32	Frederick Thomas Granville Walton CIE MICE	Engineer in Chief	Oudh and Rohilkhand Railway	1861	1900
2	33	John Thomas Warren White	District Traffic Superintendent	London and North Western Railway	1854	1884
2	34	William J. Young	Goods Superintendent, Farringdon Depot	Great Northern Railway	1855	1901
2	35	Thomas Isaac Allen	Superintendent of the Line	Great Western Railway	1856	1903
2	36	Thomas Houghton	Secretary	London and North Western Railway	1845	1902
2	37	Thomas Eaton	Superintendent of the Line	Midland Railway	1862	1906
2	38	Charles Ernest Spagnoletti MICE MIEE	First Electrical Engineer	Great Western Railway	1855	1892
2	39	Lewis Henry Viner	Principal Assistant to the General Manager	London and North Western Railway	1848	1902
2	40	George William Keeling MICE	Divisional Engineer (Gloucester)	Great Western Railway	1860	1904
2	41	William Lancaster Owen MICE	Chief Engineer for Works of Construction	Great Western Railway	1861	1891
2	42	William Dawson	Assistant Superintendent of the LIne	Great Western Railway	1864	1906
2	43	William Moffatt	Secretary and General Manager	Great North of Scotland Railway	1852	1906
2	44	David Greenwood	Superintendent of the Line	London, Brighton and South Coast Railway	1860	1907
2	45	Henry John Humphrey	Outdoor Assistant Goods Manager	Great Western Railway	1866	1908
2	46	Henry Isaac Cope	Mineral Manager	Great Western Railway	1859	1908
2	47	William Fewkes	Assistant Traffic & Mineral Manager	London and North Western Railway	1850	1903
2	48	James Watson Emmett JP	Superintendent of the Wagon Department	London and North Western Railway	1851	1903
2	49	Ernest Henry Lloyd	Divisional Engineer	Great Western Railway	1858	1901
2	50	Frederick John Dunn	General Manager	North London Railway	1866	1909
2	51	Henry Goulborn	Assistant Superintendent of the Line	London and North Western Railway	1863	1909
2	52	Lieutenant Colonel Joseph Morris MVO VD	Superintendent of the Line	Great Western Railway	1861	1910
2	53	Robert Powley Ellis MVO	Superintendent of the Line	Great Eastern Railway	1856	1910
2	54	James Hardy	District Passenger and Goods Maager	Great Northern Railway	1860	1910
2	55	Colonel Jabez Lightfoot VD	Manager	Eastern Bengal State Railway	1864	1909
2	56	John Elliott	Superintendent of the Line	Midland Railway	1863	1909
2	57	Henry James Pryce MICE	Locomotive, Carriage & Wagon & Signalling & Telegraph Superintendent	North London Railway	1869	1909
2	58	John Wilson MICE	Engineer in Chief	Great Eastern Railway	1864	191
2	59	Robert Andrews	Chief Accountant	North London Railway	1865	1909
2	60	William Thomson MVO	Superintendent of the Line	South Eastern and Chatham Railway	1863	1911
3	61	John Pearson Hornsby	Assistant Manager	Midland Great Western Railway of Ireland	1848	1894
3	62	William Thomas Clifford Beckett	Chief Engineer and Acting Agent	Bengal Nagpur Railway	1882	1905
3	63	John Dunster	Divisional Superintendent	Great Western Railway	1872	
3	64	Henry Alfred Ivatt	Chief Locomotive Engineer	Great Northern Railway	1868	1911
3	65	Lieutenant Colonel Alexander Ross	Chief Engineer	Great Northern Railway	1863	1911
3	66	Alfred Malby	Chief Goods Manager	London and South Western Railway		1912
3	67	Edwin Chalk	Goods Manager, L. T. & S. Section	Midland Railway	1862	1913
3	68	Frederick Robert Carter	Superintendent	Great Northern and London and North Western Joint Railway	1865	1911
3	69	James William Brooks	Mineral Manager	Great Northern Railway	1860	1905
3	70	John Proud	General Superintendent	Great Northern Railway	1860	1910
3	71	Alfred Booth Garside	Assistant General Manager	Metropolitan Railway		1913
3	72	Arthur James Grinling	Engineer Western Division	Great Northern Railway	1863	1911
3	73	Walter Henry Hyde	General Manager	Great Eastern Railway	1877	1914
3	74	Robert Davis	Joint Superintendent	West London and West London Extension Railway	1870	1914
3	75	Charles Wibberley	Manager	Beira, Mashonaland and Rhodesia Railway	1866	1911
3	76	Frederick Garwood Randall	Superintendent of the Line	Great Eastern Railway	1869	1914
3	77	James Edward Hennell	Assistant Goods Manager	Great Western Railway	1872	1915
3	78	Harry Jones	Chief Engineer	Great Eastern Railway	1867	1914
3	79	James Henry Finlayson VD	Accountant	Metropolitan Railway	1871	1914
3	81	Alaric Walter Churchward MVO	Paris Representative	South Eastern and Chatham Railway	1873	1914
3	82	Walter John Armstrong MICE	Construction Engineer	Great Western Railway	1871	1916
3	83	Tom Richard Johnson MICE	Chief Commissioner of Railways	New South Wales	1872	1914
3	84	John Armstrong MVO	Locomotive and Carriage Superintendent (Paddington Division)	Great Western Railway	1866	1916
3	85	Sir James Bradford	Director and Chairman	Warnfleet, Firsby and Skegness Railways		
3	86	Sir Charles Langbridge Morgan CBE MICE	Chief Engineer	London, Brighton and South Coast Railway	1883	1917
3	87	Henry Richmond Powell FRGS FRSA	District Goods Superintendent, London Division	South Eastern and Chatham Railway	1861	1910
3	89	Horace Wilmer	Chief Engineer	Great Eastern Railway	1878	1916
3	90	Thomas Nigel Wylie	Continental Traffic Manager	London, Brighton and South Coast Railway		1916
4	91	Richard Mountford Deeley MICE FGS FRMetS FRGS FGS	Locomotive Superintendent	Midland Railway	1875	1909
4	92	Henry Chad Law	London District Goods Manager	Great Western Railway	1870	1917
4	93	William Barton Worthington MICE JP	Engineer in Chief	Midland Railway	1873	1917
4	94	Oliver Stanbrooke Holt	Secretary	Great Central Railway	1869	1917
4	95	Charles Thomas Broxup	Locomotive, Carriage and Wagon Superintendent	Argentine North Eastern Railway	1874	1913
4	96	William Henry Stanier	Stores Superintendent	Great Western Railway	1864	1914
4	97	Francis John Webster	Locomotive Running Superintendent	Great Northern Railway	1879	1918
4	98	William James Grinling	Chief Traffic Manager	Great Northern Railway	1871	1919
4	99	George Shaw	Goods Manager	Great Northern Railway	1867	1919
4	100	Frank Saward	London Cartage Manager	Great Northern, Great Central and Great Eastern Railways	1873	1919
4	101	Arthur Boyce	District Goods Manager, Rugby	London and North Western Railway	1867	1920
4	102	James Robert Robertson MICE	Chief Engineer, Tilbury Section	Midland Railway	1869	1920
4	103	Benjamin Bullock	General Manager	London, Tilbury and Southend Railway		1920
4	104	James Winterbottom Morton	Mineral Manager	Great Northern Railway	1870	1920
4	105	William Willox MICE	Chief Engineer	Metropolitan Railway	1881	1921
4	106	Charles Abraham Roberts CBE	Chief Goods Manager	Great Western Railway	1871	1921
4	107	Charles Erskine Cockburn	Superintendent of the Line	Glasgow and South Western Railway	1879	1921
4	108	William Alban Jespon	Assistant to General Manager	London and North Western Railway	1871	1921
4	109	George Jackson Churchward	Chief Mechanical Engineer	Great Western Railway	1873	1921
4	110	Alfred Edwin Dolden	Chief Accountant	Great Eastern Railway	1870	1922
4	111	Poyntz Ricketts MICE	General Manager and Engineer in Chief	Peking–Mukden Railway	1882	1922
4	112	Francis Charles Castleman	District Goods Manager	London and North Western Railway	1863	1915
4	113	Alfred John Hill CBE MICE	Locomotive, Carriage and Wagon Superintendent	London and North Eastern Railway	1877	1923
4	114	Edward Watkin	General Manager	Hull and Barnsley Railway	1871	1922
4	115	Henry Frith Loney OBE	Chief Goods Manager	Midland Railway	1879	1923
4	116	Arthur Thorp	Storekeeper	Great Eastern Railway	1876	1923
4	117	Major George Frederick Parrett West CBE	Superintendent	London and South Western Railway	1880	1923
4	119	T.W. Watts	Commercial Superintendent	London and North Eastern Railway	1868	1922
4	120	James Petrie OBE	Engineer	London, Brighton and South Coast Railway	1896	1923
5	121	Captain Frederick Mortimer Barwick	Port Master and Marine Superintendent	London and North Eastern Railway	1902	1923
5	123	Alexander Preston Parker	Assistant to Divisional General Manager	London and North Eastern Railway	1872	1923
5	124	Joseph Rostern CBE	Chief Goods Manager	London and North Eastern Railway	1876	1923
5	125	Henry Angus Watson CBE MVO	General Superintendent	London and North Eastern Railway	1884	1923
5	126	Herbert Marriott	Chief Goods manager	London, Midland and Scottish Railway	1883	1924
5	128	Edwin Livesley OBE	Assistant Goods manager	Great Central Railway		1924
5	129	A.G. Aitken	District Goods manager, Manchester and Liverpool	Midland Railway	1870	1924
5	131	George Thompson Phizackerley OBE	District Goods Manager	London and North Western Railway	1873	1921
5	132	John Roughley	District Traffic and Goods Superintendent	London and North Western Railway	1874	1924
5	133	Joseph Roughton	District Goods Manager	London, Midland and Scottish Railway	1875	1925
5	134	Henry Thompson	District Superintendent	London and North Western Railway	1876	1924
5	135	William Thomas Weeks	Chief Stores Superintendent	London and North Eastern Railway	1876	1924
5	137	Harry Blundell MICE	Chief Engineer	Great Central Railway	1876	1923
5	138	Edwin Arnold Clear MICE	Assistant Divisional General Manager	London and North Eastern Railway	1877	1925
5	139	Frederick George Welch	District Goods Manager	London and North Western Railway	1881	1925
5	142	Thomas McEwen OBE MVO	Assistant General Superintendent	London, Midland and Scottish Railway	1874	1924
5	144	George Gaunt Senior OBE	Divisional Goods Manager	London, Midland and Scottish Railway	1873	1925
5	145	Ernest Goulborn	District Traffic Superintendent	London, Midland and Scottish Railway	1877	1923
5	146	Thomas Chew	Solicitor	London and North Eastern Railway	1888	1925
5	148	C.W. Neele	Chief Electrical Engineer	London and North Eastern Railway	1884	1924
5	149	Sidney Arthur Parnwell	Divisional General Manager, Southern Area	London and North Eastern Railway	1809	
5	150	William Jenkin Rich	District Goods Manager	Great Western Railway	1874	1926
6	151	Henry John SIze	District Goods Superintendent	London and North Western Railway	1852	1904
6	152	Arthur Francis Dymant	Registrar	Great Northern Railway	1873	1921
6	153	S. Williamson	General Manager	Cambrian Railway		1922
6	154	John Williams	Superintendent	Great Northern and London and North Western Joint Railway	1872	1926
6	155	James Robert Ball	Land and Estate Agent	London, Midland and Scottish Railway	1877	1924
6	156	Frederick Albert Sargent OBE	London Traffic Superintendent	London and North Western Railway	1873	1920
6	157	John Quirey CBE	Vice President	London, Midland and Scottish Railway		1931
6	158	William Frank Pettigrew MICE	Locomotive Superintendent and Chief Mechanical Engineer	Furness Railway		1918
6	159	James William Lovejoy	District Goods Manager	Great Western Railway	1882	1927
6	160	Aaron Walker	District Traffic Superintendent	London, Midland and Scottish Railway	1881	1926
6	161	George John Chesters	Stores Superintendent	London, Midland and Scottish Railway	1878	1923
6	162	Samuel Walter Burleigh	Superintendent (Hotels)	London, Midland and Scottish Railway	1882	1926
6	163	Thomas Abbott Painter MBE	District Goods Manager	London and North Eastern Railway	1878	1927
6	164	Alfred Puleston	London Estate Agent	London and North Eastern Railway	1903	1925
6	165	John Procter Smith	Divisional Accountant (London)	London and North Eastern Railway	1881	1928
6	166	Thomas Edward Whitmore Guest	District Passenger Superintendent	London, Midland and Scottish Railway	1875	1924
6	167	Arthur William Longden	Store Keeper (Gorton)	Manchester, Sheffield and Lincolnshire Railway	1859	1907
6	168	Frank Brisson Mortimore	Assistant Goods Manager	Great Western Railway	1876	1927
6	169	Frank Tatlow CBE	General Manager	Midland Railway	1875	1922
6	170	Richard John Moore JP	Superintendent of the Line	Great Northern Railway	1879	1927
6	171	William Clow CBE	Superintendent	London and North Eastern Railway	1878	1927
6	172	George Hughes CBE MICE	Chief Mechanical Engineer	London, Midland and Scottish Railway	1882	1925
6	173	John Pike OBE	Goods Commercial Manager	London, Midland and Scottish Railway	1884	1928
6	174	William E. James	District Goods Manager	Great Western Railway	1881	1928
6	175	John Parry Monkhouse OBE	Mineral Traffic Manager	Great Western Railway	1880	1927
6	176	Alfred Weeks Szlumper CBE MICE	Chief Engineer	Southern Railway	1881	1927
6	177	William Joseph Skinner Cox OBE	Assistant Goods Manager (Coal)	Great Western Railway	1870	1920
6	178	Samuel Lees Murgatroyd OBE	Permanent Way Engineer	London and North Eastern Railway	1881	1929
6	179	Robert Christopher Irwin CBE	Secretary	London, Midland and Scottish Railway	1881	1927
6	180	John William Faulkner	Mineral Manager	London and North Eastern Railway	1882	1927
7	181	Thomas Moffet	Divisional Estate and Land Agent	London and North Western Railway	1876	1922
7	182	William Alfred Thomas	District Goods Manager	London and North Western Railway	1880	1929
7	183	Stanley Herbert Hunt	Chief Goods Manager	London, Midland and Scottish Railway	1882	1928
7	184	Cumberland Lowndes	Chief Goods Manager	London and North Western Railway	1883	1914
7	185	Alexander Wilson OBE	Divisional General Manager	London and North Eastern Railway	1877	1929
7	186	Arthur Morton Bell OBE	Carriage and Wagon Superintendent	Great Indian Peninsular Railway	1881	1925
7	187	Fredrick William Dingley	Chief Running Superintendent	London and North Western Railway	1875	1927
7	188	Frederick Stephen Bridge	Divisional Commercial Manager	London and South Western Railway	1884	1930
7	189	Sydney Frederick Johnson	Divisional Superintendent	Great Western Railway	1871	1922
7	190	Henry Ferrett	Assistant Mineral Manager	London and North Western Railway	1868	1920
7	191	George Tullidge Hedge OBE	Commercial Manager	Southern Railway	1881	1930
7	192	Hubert Job Guest	Goods Commercial Manager	London, Midland and Scottish Railway	1886	1929
7	193	Robert Horace Todd	Cartage Manager	London and North Eastern Railway	1885	1930
7	194	William Tuckett Venton	Commercial Manager	Southern Railway	1892	1930
7	195	Ernest Prebble MICE	Assistant Engineer (Permanent Way)	London, Midland and Scottish Railway	1903	1929
7	196	Arthur Wood-Hill MICE	Divisional Engineer	London, Midland and Scottish Railway	1905	1930
7	197	James Frederick Gee	Chief Accountant	London, Midland and Scottish Railway	1884	1930
7	198	Mark Moyle Parkes	Assistant Secretary	London, Midland and Scottish Railway	1897	1929
7	199	Thomas Henry Shipley	District Manager	London, Midland and Scottish Railway	1886	1931
7	200	Arthur William Allen OBE	Mineral Manager	London, Midland and Scottish Railway	175	1926
7	201	Elias Ford	Chief Goods Manager	Great Western Railway	1884	1931
7	202	Elias Crofts	District Goods Manager	London, Midland and Scottish Railway	1884	1931
7	203	Frederick Ernest Baxandall	District Goods and Passenger Manager	London, Midland and Scottish Railway	1883	1931
7	204	Henry Ferguson	Assistant Goods Manager	London and North Eastern Railway	1876	1928
7	205	Thomas Smith	Assistant Superintendent	London and North Eastern Railway	1880	1930
7	206	F. Ruffell	Passenger Services Assistant	London, Midland and Scottish Railway	1886	1932
7	207	Arthur Henry Bull	Audit Accountant	Southern Railway	1880	1932
7	208	Thomas Christopher	District Superintendent	London and North Eastern Railway	1885	1931
7	209	Henry John Rudgard OBE MICE	Assistant Engineer	London and North Eastern Railway	1885	1931
7	210	Ernest Banner Hassall	Assistant to the vice-president, Railway Traffic and Operating	London, Midland and Scottish Railway	1896	1932
7	211	Thomas Edward Lovell	Registrar	Great Western Railway	1888	1932
7	212	James Fenton Bradford	District Passenger Manager	London, Midland and Scottish Railway	1888	1932
7	213	John Powell	Divisional Superintendent	Great Western Railway	1873	1924
7	214	William Arthur Wooding	Divisional Accountant	London and North Eastern Railway	1884	1932
7	215	Lionel Speakman	General Manager	Furness Railway	1902	1923
7	216	John Robert Catherall	District Goods Manager	Great Western Railway	1983	1931
7	217	George Newton Ford OBE	Divisional Superintendent	London, Midland and Scottish Railway		1931
7	218	Arthur Brissenden Holloway	Goods Manager	Great Western Railway	1883	1931
7	219	Henry John Smeddle OBE TD	Locomotive Running Superintendent	London and North Eastern Railway	1882	1931
7	220	E.H. Dannatt	Divisional Superintendent	Great Western Railway	1894	
7	221	Frederick James Paice AMICE RNVR	Dock and Harbour Assistant	London, Midland and Scottish Railway	1890	1933
7	222	Henry Rowland Campfield	Divisional Superintendent	Great Western Railway	1894	1933
7	223	Richard Howell Nicholls CBE	Superintendent of the Line	Great Western Railway	1884	1932
7	224	Oliver John White	Mineral Traffic Manager	Great Western Railway	1890	1933
7	225	Alexander Newlands MICE	Chief Engineer	London, Midland and Scottish Railway	1892	1933
7	226	Percy Douglas Michod OBE	Assistant Signal and Telegraph Engineer	London, Midland and Scottish Railway	1893	1933
7	227	John Henry Follows CBE MVO	Vice President	London, Midland and Scottish Railway	1890	1932
7	228	Mortimer Constantine Tait	Chief Solicitor	London and North Western Railway	1874	1921
7	229	Arthur Turnbull	District Engineer	London, Midland and Scottish Railway	1890	1932
7	230	Sir Felix John Clewett Pole KT	General Manager	Great Western Railway	1891	1929
8	231	Sir Arthur Watson CBE MICE	General Manager	London, Midland and Scottish Railway	1890	1924
8	232	Henry William Collins Drury	District Superintendent	London and North Eastern Railway	1890	1933
8	233	Sir Henry Fowler KBE CBE JP DSC MICE	Assistant to vice president for Works (Research and Development)	London, Midland and Scottish Railway	1887	1933
8	234	Lawrence Dudley Parsons	Assistant to Chief General Superintendent	London, Midland and Scottish Railway	1895	1931
8	235	Lieutenant Colonel Henry Adin Hull MICE	District Engineer	London, Midland and Scottish Railway	1884	1933
8	236	Joseph Sayers OBE	Telegraph Superintendent	London, Midland and Scottish Railway	1888	1934
8	237	Frederick William Tyler	District Goods Manager	Great Western Railway	1887	1933
8	238	Alfred Brook JP	Divisional Superintendent	Great Western Railway	1879	1929
8	239	John Quirey CBE	Vice President (Railway Traffic Operating and Commercial Section)	London, Midland and Scottish Railway	1882	1931
8	240	Charles Bassage	Principal Assistant to Chief Goods Manager	Great Western Railway	1884	1934
8	241	Edward Lake Hawkins	Assistant Engineer (Maintenance)	London and North Eastern Railway	1892	1934
8	242	Alfred Tatlow	New Works Assistant to Chief General Superintendent	London, Midland and Scottish Railway	1883	1928
8	243	Harry Powell Miles OBE MICE	Divisional Engineer (Derby)	London, Midland and Scottish Railway	1888	1929
8	244	Arthur James Brickwell CBE	Estate and Rating Surveyor (Southern Area)	London and North Eastern Railway	1887	1935
8	245	John Brant Rogers	District Superintendent	London and North Eastern Railway	1888	1934
8	246	William Joseph Smith MBE	Works Superintendent (Carriage and Wagon Department, Derby)	London, Midland and Scottish Railway	1884	1931
8	247	William Embry Bradbury MBE	Assistant to Chief General Superintendent (Naval and Military)	London, Midland and Scottish Railway	1878	1924
8	248	Henry William Ede MBE	District Goods and Passenger Manager	London, Midland and Scottish Railway	1890	1935
8	249	Arthur Twist	Horse Superintendent	Great Western Railway	1888	1931
8	250	Ernest Wharton	Mineral Manager	London, Midland and Scottish Railway	1888	1934
8	251	Henry John Burcham	Chief Rating Surveyor	London, Midland and Scottish Railway	1888	1933
8	252	John Christopher Mitchell JP FCIS	Secretary and Treasurer	London Underground	1886	1933
8	253	Alfred William Arthurton	Director British Railways Press Bureau		1888	1934
8	254	Alfred Oldham	Divisional Signal and Telegraph Engineer	London, Midland and Scottish Railway	1890	1935
8	255	Walter Edward Thornhill MC MICE	Divisional Engineer	London, Midland and Scottish Railway	1895	1935
8	256	John Wardle	Assistant Commercial Manager	London Passenger Transport Board	1891	1934
8	257	Archibald William Willet MICE	Chief Engineer of the Birmingham Canal	London and North Western Railway	1881	1923
8	258	Ernest William Mauger	District Goods Manager	Great Western Railway	1891	1935
8	259	John Arthur Milligan	London District Passenger Manager	London, Midland and Scottish Railway	1887	1935
8	260	George Francis Thurston	Divisional General Manager (Southern Area)	London and North Eastern Railway	1885	1935
8	261	Herbert Elliott Cracknell	District Goods Manager	Great Western Railway	1891	1936
8	262	Walter Arthur Brown	London District Freight Superintendent	Southern Railway	1897	1936
8	263	William Alfred Messer	Permanent Way Engineer	Southern Railway	1891	1934
8	264	Alfred Chorley Cookson	Stores Superintendent	Great Western Railway	1894	1936
8	265	John Frederick Lean OBE FCIS	Principal Assistant to General Manager	Great Western Railway	1887	1936
8	266	Thomas Martin	District Goods Manager	Great Western Railway	1889	1936
8	267	Alleyne Stentiford Mills	District Goods Manager	Great Western Railway	1893	1936
8	268	George James Walker	Manager of Hotels Department	Great Western Railway	1903	1936
8	269	John Stewart Wilson OBE	Assistant Audit Accountant	Southern Railway	1886	1936
8	270	Arthur Cowrie Stamer CBE	Assistant Chief Mechanical Engineer	London and North Eastern Railway	1891	1933
8	271	John Hilder Woodhead	Assistant to Chief Engineer (Surveying)	London, Midland and Scottish Railway	1892	1936
8	272	Robert Rowbottom	Assistant to Goods Manager (Rates)	London and North Eastern Railway		1926
8	273	Harold Edgar Daman	Divisional Engineer	Great Western Railway	1891	1932
8	274	Robert Killin CBE	General Superintendent (Northern Division)	London, Midland and Scottish Railway	1882	1932
8	275	Lieutenant Colonel Edwin Charles Cox CVO CBE TD	Traffic Manager	Southern Railway	1881	1936
8	276	Colonel William Henry Hall OBE	District Goods Manager	Great Western Railway	1891	1935
8	277	William Richard Jones	Divisional Signal and Telegraph Engineer	London, Midland and Scottish Railway	1891	1937
8	278	William Henry John Pyne	Assistant Transportation Superintendent	Great Indian Peninsular Railway	1897	1937
8	279	John Farrow Brook	District Passenger Manager	London, Midland and Scottish Railway	1892	1937
8	280	Edward Douglas Grasett OBE	Divisional Superintendent of Operation	London, Midland and Scottish Railway	1895	1937
9	281	William John Clayton	Estate Agent	Southern Railway	1881	1935
9	282	Lewis Cecil Geach	Superintendent of Motive Post	London, Midland and Scottish Railway	1896	1927
9	283	Charles William Edwards	Assistant Accountant	Southern Railway	1874	1924
9	284	Richard Edward Lloyd Maunsell CBE	Chief Mechanical Engineer	Southern Railway		1937
9	285	Henry Rivers Cripps OBE	Chief Assistant Solicitor	London and North Eastern Railway	1823	1937
9	286	William Gregory JP	Chief of Police	London, Midland and Scottish Railway	1883	1930
9	287	John Miller MICE	Engineer, North Eastern Area	London and North Eastern Railway	1916	1937
9	288	Arthur White OBE	Divisional Superintendent, London (East)	Southern Railway	1888	1936
9	289	Joseph Robertson Morris	Divisional Superintendent	Great Western Railway	1888	1938
9	290	Charles James Challenger	District Goods Manager	Great Western Railway	1891	1938
9	291	Arthur Reginald Cooper MICE MIEE	Chief Engineer	London Passenger Transport Board	1893	1937
9	292	John Murray OBE	Chief Engineer	London, Midland and Scottish Railway	1887	1932
9	293	Ernest Edward Painter	Secretary	Railway Clearing House	1890	1939
9	294	John Pattinson Thomas MIEE	General Manager (Railways)	London Passenger Transport Board	1901	1938
9	295	Charles Cooper	Continental Traffic Assistant	Southern Railway	1885	1938
9	296	Herbert Ivo Bond	Divisional Engineer	Southern Railway	1900	1939
9	297	Percy Syder	London City Manager	London and North Eastern Railway	1896	1939
9	298	John William Walklett Enser	District Traffic Manager	Great Western Railway	1896	1940
9	299	Henry Wheeler	Assistant to General Manager	Great Western Railway	1892	1939
9	300	John Barrowcliff Scattergood	District Goods Manager	London, Midland and Scottish Railway	1892	1940
9	301	Frank Rowe Potter	Superintendent of the Line	Great Western Railway	1895	1940
9	302	Andrew Howie	Joint Accountant	Southern Railway	1890	1940
9	303	Charles Felix Slade MICE	District Engineer	London and North Eastern Railway	1898	1941
9	304	Herbert William Payne	Principal Assistant to Chief Goods Manager	Great Western Railway	1896	1941
9	305	Frederick Kinsey Pelley	District Goods Manager	Great Western Railway	1889	1939
9	306	Patrick Joseph Floyd	Traffic Manager	Southern Railway of Ireland	1881	1942
9	307	Cornelius James Selway CBE	Passenger Manager (S. Area)	London and North Eastern Railway	1892	1940
9	308	Raymond Carpmael OBE MICE	Chief Engineer	Great Western Railway	1900	1939
9	309	William Edward Hart	Divisional Superintendent	Great Western Railway	1892	1942
9	310	Horace Ernest Horne	Assistant Chief Commercial Manager	London, Midland and Scottish Railway	1888	1942
9	311	Alexander Maynard	Chief Goods Manager	Great Western Railway	1909	1942
9	312	James Dalziel	Assistant Electrical Engineer	London, Midland and Scottish Railway	1899	1935
9	313	Gilbert Savil Szlumper CBE TD MICE	General Manager	Southern Railway	1901	1942
9	314	Cecil Herbert Bloomfield-Smith MICE	District Engineer	London and North Eastern Railway	1910	1942
9	315	William James Hatcher	Assistant Secretary	Southern Railway	1887	1937
9	316	Victor Hpe Boalth	Chief Commercial Manager	North Western Railway of India	1887	1937
9	317	David Chalmers Urie MICE	Superintendent of Motive Power	London, Midland and Scottish Railway	1901	1943
9	318	Stanley Bronislaw Carter	Outdoor Superintendent to Chief Operating and Commercial Managr	London, Midland and Scottish Railway	1900	1942
9	319	Major Percy Marriott Payne TD AMICE	Chief Rating Surveyor	London, Midland and Scottish Railway	1889	1930
9	320	Fulwar Cecil Ashton Coventry	Superintendent of Road Transport	Great Western Railway	1893	1942
9	321	Thomas William Jacobs	European Traffic Manager	Baltimore and Ohio Railroad	1901	1942
9	322	Charles Henry Tait	District Goods and Passenger Manager	London, Midland and Scottish Railway	1894	1943
9	323	George Seatter Begg	Passenger Manager Scottish Area	London and North Eastern Railway	1894	1943
9	324	Douglas Crosbie Kingsford McCulloch	Assistant Chief Commercial Manager	London, Midland and Scottish Railway	1901	1943
9	325	William Michael Perts	Commercial Superintendent	Southern Railway	1891	1943
9	326	James Gordon Symes	Assistant Estate Agent	Southern Railway	1894	1941
9	327	George Ellson CBE MICE	Chief Engineer	Southern Railway	1899	1944
9	328	Henry Barnden	Registrar	Southern Railway	1901	1944
9	329	Lieutenant Colonel K.R.N. Speir DSO	Assistant to Chief Commercial Manager for Overseas and Continental Traffic	London, Midland and Scottish Railway	1896	1942
9	330	Harry Vincent Mosley	Chief Executive Officer (New Works and Parliamentary Business)	London, Midland and Scottish Railway	1896	1944
10	331	William Davis JP	District Goods Manager	Great Western Railway	1901	1943
10	332	Hamilton Bertrand Webster	Assistant for Rates and Charges	London, Midland and Scottish Railway	1894	1944
10	333	Ashton Davis CVO OBE	Vice President	London, Midland and Scottish Railway	1919	1944
10	334	Alan Cobb	Locomotive Running Superintendent	Southern Railway	1900	1944
10	335	Arthur Ernest Kirkus OBE	Director of Statistics	Ministry of Transport	1892	1938
10	336	Sir William Arthur Stanier	Chief Mechanical Engineer	London, Midland and Scottish Railway	1892	1944
10	337	Sir Sam Fay	General Manager	Great Central Railway	1872	1922
10	338	William John England OBE	Superintendent of Operation	Southern Railway	1896	1945
10	339	Arthur Edward Moore	Audit Accountant	Southern Railway	1895	1945
10	340	William Henry Eustace Humphrey	Cartage Controller	Great Western Railway	1900	1945
10	341	Herbert Edward Ogle Wheeler OBE	Deputy Traffic Manager	Southern Railway	1896	1945
10	342	Ronald Claude Yvonne Kirkpatrick	Divisional Engineer	Great Western Railway	1899	1945
10	343	Harry Entwhisle Roberts	District Passenger Manager	London, Midland and Scottish Railway	1902	1945
10	344	Cecil Joseph Collins Latham	Divisional Traffic Superintendent	Southern Railway	1896	1945
10	345	Sir Theodore Eastaway Thomas CBE	General Manager	London Passenger Transport Board	1915	1945
10	346	Frederick Charles Wilson MBE	District Superintendent	London and North Eastern Railway	1894	1944
10	347	Edward Gerrard Garstang	District Goods Manager	London, Midland and Scottish Railway	1905	1945
10	348	Henry Ernest Robarts	Divisional Engineer	Southern Railway	1899	1945
10	349	Edward Henry d’Esterre Darby	Assistant Chief Engineer	London, Midland and Scottish Railway	1902	1945
10	350	Henry John Green MC OBE	Chief Civil Engineer	London Passenger Transport Board	1908	1944
10	351	Henry James Peacock OBE	Assistant Superintendent of the Line	Great Western Railway	1898	1945
10	352	James Edward Sharpe MBE	Assistant Superintendent	London and North Eastern Railway	1898	1943
10	353	Edward Falconer	Goods Terminal Assistant to Chief Goods Manager	London, Midland and Scottish Railway	1896	1946
10	354	William John Thomas	Chief Docks Manager	Great Western Railway	1924	1944
10	355	Ralph George Davidson	Chief Accountant	Southern Railway	1897	1946
10	356	Percy Gilbert Robinson MBE	Assistant Manager, Hotels and Catering	Great Western Railway	1897	1946
10	357	George Stephens	Chief of Police	Great Western Railway	1898	1945
10	358	Stanley Rupert Geary	General Manager (Road Services)	London Passenger Transport Board	1905	1946
10	359	Kenelm Kerr OBE	Assistant General Manager (Staff)	London and North Eastern Railway	1912	1946
10	360	William Hamilton Shortt MICE	Western Divisional Engineer	Southern Railway	1902	1946
10	361	Ernest Lake OBE	Divisional Engineer	Great Western Railway	1894	1945
10	362	James Morris Kirkwood	District Goods and Passenger Manager	London, Midland and Scottish Railway	1898	1944
10	363	Percy Acton Clews	European Manager	Canadian National Railway	1907	1947
10	364	Charles Newton Mansfield	Mineral Manager and Principal Chief Assistant, Chief Commercial Manager	London, Midland and Scottish Railway	1900	1947
10	365	Sir Charles Henry Newton	Chief General Manager	London and North Eastern Railway	1897	1947
10	366	Sandham John Symes OBE	Chief Stores Superintendent	London, Midland and Scottish Railway	1894	1947
10	367	Charles Johnstone	Assistant Chief Commercial Manager (Passenger)	London, Midland and Scottish Railway	1901	1947
10	368	Joseph Edmund Thomas Stanbra	Secretary	Railway Clearing House	1886	1947
10	369	Harold Brown	District Engineer	London, Midland and Scottish Railway	1898	1947
10	370	Sir Leonard Wilson KCIE	Chief Commissioner for Railways	Government of India		
10	371	Charles Thomas Cox	Divisional Superintendent	Great Western Railway	1897	1947
10	372	Frederick Charles Bishop	Divisional Superintendent	Southern Railway	1897	1947
10	373	Frederick Holland	Divisional Engineer	Great Western Railway	1907	1947
10	374	FrankEveritt	District Engineer	London, Midland and Scottish Railway	1902	1947
10	375	Arthur Brett Chester	New Works Engineer	Southern Railway	1911	1947
10	376	Hugh McKenzie Collings	London (Suburban) District Goods Manager	London and North Eastern Railway	1896	1947
10	377	Arnold Clear	District Locomotive Superintendent	London and North Eastern Railway	1911	1947
10	378	Arthur John Grinling	District Engineer	London and North Eastern Railway	1901	1947
10	379	Francis Edgar Wildsmith Cox	General Assistant to Chief Engineer	London, Midland and Scottish Railway	1904	1947
10	380	Sir James Milne KCVO CSI	General Manager	Great Western Railway	1904	1947
