= Allan Quartermaine =

British engineer (1888–1978)

Sir Allan Quartermaine
- Born: 9 November 1888; London, England
- Died: 17 October 1978 (aged 89)
- Education: Highgate School, University College London
- Engineering career
- Discipline: Civil
- Institutions: Institution of Civil Engineers (president)

Sir Allan Stephen Quartermaine, CBE, MC (9 November 1888 – 17 October 1978) was a British civil engineer. He started his career in the Hertfordshire county surveyor's office and served in the Royal Engineers during the First World War, constructing railways in the Middle East and being awarded the Military Cross. After the war he continued to work for local authorities before joining the Great Western Railway (GWR), where he became chief engineer by 1940. During the Second World War he served as Director-General of Aircraft Production Factories before returning to the GWR to construct military railway facilities. After the war he refused a position on the Railway Executive of the British Transport Commission as he disagreed with nationalisation of the railways. Despite this he transferred to become chief engineer of the Western Region of British Railways in 1948 and later served as an adviser to British Rail on modernisation. Quartermaine served as president of the Institution of Civil Engineers for 1951–52 and was knighted in 1956.

== Early life and First World War ==
Allan Stephen Quartermaine was born in London on 9 November 1888 and, after attending Highgate School, was awarded a first class honours Bachelor of Science degree in engineering at University College London, where he was a Chadwick Scholar and later a Fellow (appointed 1938). He started his engineering career in the office of the Hertfordshire county surveyor in 1908.

Quartermaine served as a commissioned officer in the Royal Engineers during the First World War and worked to develop railway facilities for the troops in Egypt and Palestine. It was while carrying out this work that he was awarded the Military Cross for gallantry on 3 June 1918, at which point he was serving as a temporary captain. Quartermaine was promoted to acting major on 24 May 1919, a rank he relinquished on 15 June 1919.

After the war Quartermaine returned to the Hertfordshire County Council Surveyor’s Department and later worked for Teesside's Bridge and Engineering Department. Afterwards he joined the staff of the Great Western Railway (GWR) and rose to become assistant chief engineer. He was appointed the GWR's chief assistant engineer at Gloucester in 1920. He worked on a large number of tunnels, bridges and viaducts for the railway and was promoted to deputy chief engineer in 1929.

Throughout this time Quartermaine remained liable for recall to the British Army as he was a captain of the Royal Engineers (Transportation) in the Supplementary Reserve of Officers, being promoted to major in that unit on 19 November 1924. Quartermaine resigned from the Supplementary Reserve on 1 January 1926, transferring immediately to the Regular Army Reserve of Officers while retaining his rank and association with the Royal Engineers. He reached the age limit (50) for recall to the British Army on 9 November 1938 and as of that date ceased to be a member of the reserves.

== Second World War ==
Quartermaine became chief engineer of the GWR by 1940 and in June that year was appointed the government's Director-General of Aircraft Production Factories. This role was with the Ministry of Aircraft Production and would see him coordinating works to construct new factories and equip existing factories to more efficiently produce airframes, engines and other components. Quartermaine returned to the GWR in January 1941 as it had been tasked with carrying out extensive railway construction works for military purposes.

Quartermaine also served in the Engineer and Railway Staff Corps, an unpaid, volunteer unit which provided technical expertise to the British Army. He was appointed Colonel in this corps on 29 October 1943 and was appointed a Commander of the Order of the British Empire in the same year.

Quartermaine was close to James Milne, general manager of the GWR. Milne opposed nationalisation of the railways and refused, when offered in 1948, the chairmanship of the Railway Executive of the nationalised British Transport Commission (BTC). Quartermaine who was by then the company's civil engineer and the assistant manager Keith Grand both then also refused positions with the BTC. Quartermaine having been offered a seat on the executive by Sir Cyril Hurcomb. These refusals, together with the need to balance the executive between representatives of the rail companies, meant that Frank Pope of the London, Midland and Scottish Railway was passed over in favour of David Blee who held the junior position of assistant to the chief goods manager at the GWR. After nationalisation of the railways proceeded later in 1948 he served as chief engineer of the Western Region of British Railways until 1951.

== In retirement ==
Quartermaine retired from the railway in 1951 and in May that year was elected president of the Institution of Civil Engineers for the November 1951 to November 1952 session. His presidential address covered the history of the early years of railway engineering the United Kingdom. Asked his opinion on the "Battle of the Gauges" he characterised it as a question of personal differences between George Stephenson, who was a proponent of the standard gauge of four feet eight and a half inches and Isambard Kingdom Brunel who preferred his broad gauge of seven feet and a quarter inch.

From 1954 Quartermain served as chairman of the British Standards Institution's Council for Codes of Practice. On 7 September Quartermaine and Geoffrey Jellicoe were appointed members of the Royal Fine Art Commission to replace William Halcrow and John Summerson respectively. In 1955 Quartermaine finally consented to join the BTC, being co-opted as a railway modernisation expert. Quartermaine was awarded a knighthood on 2 January 1956, which was conferred by Queen Elizabeth II at Buckingham Palace on 10 July 1956. He served as president of the Smeatonian Society of Civil Engineers in 1959. Quartermaine retired from the Royal Fine Arts Commission on 18 November 1960 and died on 17 October 1978.

Professional and academic associations
Preceded by William Glanville	President of the Institution of Civil Engineers; 1951–1952	Succeeded by Henry Cronin
Preceded by Raymond Carpmael	Chief Engineer of the Great Western Railway; 1940–1948	Succeeded by
