= Cissa =

Cissa may refer to:

Places and jurisdictions

- Cissa, Roman name of present Caska on the island of Pag, Croatia
  - Cissa (titular see), a former Catholic diocese with see there, now a Latin titular see
- Cissa, alternate name of ancient Cressa (Thrace)
- Cissa, alternate name of ancient Tarraco
- Battle of Cissa, 218 BC, in the Second Punic War
- Cissa, Burkina Faso, a village in Burkina Faso

Persons

- Cissa of Crowland, 8th-century saint
- Cissa of Sussex, a (possibly mythological) king of the South Saxons in the 6th century
- Cissa (West Saxon), possibly viceroy of king Centwine of Wessex

Other

- Cissa (bird), a genus of magpies
