= Human rights in Burkina Faso =

Human rights in Burkina Faso are addressed in its constitution, which was ratified in 1991. The 2009 Human Rights Report by the United States Department of State noted concerns regarding restrictions on the press and the operation of the judiciary system. In its 2021 report, Human Rights Watch described the human rights situation in Burkina Faso as being "precarious" in light of ongoing violence committed by Islamists, government security forces, and pro-government militias.

== Constitution and legislative response ==
Approved in 1991, the constitution of Burkina Faso addresses the basic civil liberties of the people. The government has also ratified numerous UN treaties such as ICCPR and CEDAW.

The government has launched investigations into human rights breaches allegedly perpetrated in its name, including the deaths of over 200 men in Djibo which were believed to have been caused by pro-government security forces, although little information has been provided about the outcomes of such investigations. The Military Justice Directorate was established to investigate crimes committed by government forces, but is extremely underfunded.

In response to the ongoing COVID-19 pandemic in the country, the Burkinabé government released 1200 detainees to prevent its spread in prisons. They also expanded the provision of learning through radio, television and online platforms in light of school closures to prevent coronavirus spreading. Efforts have also been made to implement more security at the country's schools to protect them from Islamist attacks.

== Issues ==
=== Government forces ===
Amnesty International noted concerns over the arbitrary arrest of protesters, and the failure to respect the principle of due process. In March 2020, government security forces were reported to have executed 23 people in Cissa; the following month, a further 31 detainees were killed hours after being arrested during a counterterrorism operation in Djibo. In May 2020, twelve men arrested by gendarmes in Tanwalbougou were subsequently found dead in their cells; it was reported that they had been shot. Security forces have also been reported to have physically abused Malian refugees seeking shelter in Burkina Faso under the guise of searching for Islamist terrorists in the country's refugee camps.

=== Militias ===
Burkina Faso has long contained within it local militias known as Koglweogo, who are pro-government. Concerns have arisen around the militias, composed largely of the Mossi ethnic group, carrying out atrocities, including the massacre of forty men in Yirgou in 2019. In January 2020, legislation passed by the Burkinabé government subsumed the Koglweogo into the Volunteers for the Defence of the Homeland (VDH), which receives official government support and training. Subsequently, members of the VDH have been accused of the murder of 19 men near Manja Hien in February 2020, and attacks on Peuhle villages in Yatenga, in which 43 people were killed.

Internationally, Burkinabé forces have also been accused of the extrajudicial killings of at least 50 people in cross border skirmishes in Mali in 2020.

=== Islamists ===
An Islamist insurgency has been occurring in the country, with attacks against citizens being justified by insurgents by linking victims to the government, armed militias, the West, and Christianity. Massacres have notably been committed against the Mossi and Foulse ethnic groups, including the murder of 35 people in Arbinda in December 2019; the death of 90 villagers during separate attacks on Rofénèga, Nagraogo and Silgadji in January 2020; and over 40 villagers' deaths in attacks in Lamdamol and Pansi in February 2020. Islamist groups have also used improved explosive devices to target victims. Abduction has also been a common tactic; in July 2020 the village chief of Nassoumbou was abducted and held for two months; while in August 2020 Sonibou Cisse, the Grand Imam of Djibo, was executed days after being abducted.

Islamists have also targeted Burkina Faso's schools. Between January and August 2020, at least forty schools were burned and looted, and teachers have been killed, beaten, abducted, robbed, and threatened. Prior to the government closure of all Burkinabé schools due to the COVID-19 pandemic in March 2020, an estimated 2500 schools had already closed due to Islamist attacks and concerns around student safety, impacting 350, 000 students.

== Historical situation ==
The following chart shows Burkina Faso's ratings since 1972 in the Freedom in the World reports, published annually by US government funded Freedom House. A score of 1 is "most free" and 7 is "least free".^{1}

Historical ratings

Year	Political Rights	Civil Liberties	Status	President^{2}
1972	3	4	Partly Free	Sangoulé Lamizana
1973	3	4	Partly Free	Sangoulé Lamizana
1974	6	4	Partly Free	Sangoulé Lamizana
1975	6	4	Partly Free	Sangoulé Lamizana
1976	5	5	Partly Free	Sangoulé Lamizana
1977	5	4	Partly Free	Sangoulé Lamizana
1978	2	3	Free	Sangoulé Lamizana
1979	2	3	Free	Sangoulé Lamizana
1980	6	5	Partly Free	Sangoulé Lamizana
1981	6	5	Partly Free	Saye Zerbo
1982^{3}	6	5	Partly Free	Saye Zerbo
1983	6	5	Partly Free	Jean-Baptiste Ouédraogo
1984	7	5	Not Free	Thomas Sankara
1985	7	6	Not Free	Thomas Sankara
1986	7	6	Not Free	Thomas Sankara
1987	7	6	Not Free	Thomas Sankara
1988	7	6	Not Free	Blaise Compaoré
1989	6	5	Not Free	Blaise Compaoré
1990	6	5	Not Free	Blaise Compaoré
1991	6	5	Not Free	Blaise Compaoré
1992	5	5	Partly Free	Blaise Compaoré
1993	5	4	Partly Free	Blaise Compaoré
1994	5	4	Partly Free	Blaise Compaoré
1995	5	4	Partly Free	Blaise Compaoré
1996	5	4	Partly Free	Blaise Compaoré
1997	5	4	Partly Free	Blaise Compaoré
1998	5	4	Partly Free	Blaise Compaoré
1999	4	4	Partly Free	Blaise Compaoré
2000	4	4	Partly Free	Blaise Compaoré
2001	4	4	Partly Free	Blaise Compaoré
2002	4	4	Partly Free	Blaise Compaoré
2003	4	4	Partly Free	Blaise Compaoré
2004	5	4	Partly Free	Blaise Compaoré
2005	5	3	Partly Free	Blaise Compaoré
2006	5	3	Partly Free	Blaise Compaoré
2007	5	3	Partly Free	Blaise Compaoré
2008	5	3	Partly Free	Blaise Compaoré
2009	5	3	Partly Free	Blaise Compaoré
2010	5	3	Partly Free	Blaise Compaoré
2011	5	3	Partly Free	Blaise Compaoré
2012	5	3	Partly Free	Blaise Compaoré
2013	5	3	Partly Free	Blaise Compaoré
2014	6	3	Partly Free	Blaise Campaoré

== International treaties ==
Burkina Faso's stances on international human rights treaties are as follows:

International treaties

Treaty	Organization	Introduced	Signed	Ratified
Convention on the Prevention and Punishment of the Crime of Genocide	United Nations	1948	-	1965
International Convention on the Elimination of All Forms of Racial Discrimination	United Nations	1966	-	1974
International Covenant on Economic, Social and Cultural Rights	United Nations	1966	-	1999
International Covenant on Civil and Political Rights	United Nations	1966	-	1999
First Optional Protocol to the International Covenant on Civil and Political Rights	United Nations	1966	-	1999
Convention on the Non-Applicability of Statutory Limitations to War Crimes and Crimes Against Humanity	United Nations	1968	-	-
International Convention on the Suppression and Punishment of the Crime of Apartheid	United Nations	1973	1976	1978
Convention on the Elimination of All Forms of Discrimination against Women	United Nations	1979	-	1987
Convention against Torture and Other Cruel, Inhuman or Degrading Treatment or Punishment	United Nations	1984	-	1999
Convention on the Rights of the Child	United Nations	1989	1990	1990
Second Optional Protocol to the International Covenant on Civil and Political Rights, aiming at the abolition of the death penalty	United Nations	1989	-	-
International Convention on the Protection of the Rights of All Migrant Workers and Members of Their Families	United Nations	1990	2001	2003
Optional Protocol to the Convention on the Elimination of All Forms of Discrimination against Women	United Nations	1999	2001	2005
Optional Protocol to the Convention on the Rights of the Child on the Involvement of Children in Armed Conflict	United Nations	2000	2001	2007
Optional Protocol to the Convention on the Rights of the Child on the Sale of Children, Child Prostitution and Child Pornography	United Nations	2000	2001	2006
Convention on the Rights of Persons with Disabilities	United Nations	2006	2007	2009
Optional Protocol to the Convention on the Rights of Persons with Disabilities	United Nations	2006	2009	-2009
International Convention for the Protection of All Persons from Enforced Disappearance	United Nations	2006	2007	2009
Optional Protocol to the International Covenant on Economic, Social and Cultural Rights	United Nations	2008	-	-
Optional Protocol to the Convention on the Rights of the Child on a Communications Procedure	United Nations	2011	-	-

== See also ==
- Freedom of religion in Burkina Faso
- Human trafficking in Burkina Faso
- Internet censorship and surveillance in Burkina Faso
- LGBT rights in Burkina Faso
- Politics of Burkina Faso

== Notes ==
1. Note that the "Year" signifies the "Year covered". Therefore the information for the year marked 2008 is from the report published in 2009, and so on.
2. As of January 1.
3. The 1982 report covers the year 1981 and the first half of 1982, and the following 1984 report covers the second half of 1982 and the whole of 1983. In the interest of simplicity, these two aberrant "year and a half" reports have been split into three year-long reports through interpolation.
