= BR Standard Class 9F 92220 Evening Star =

Preserved British steam locomotive completed in 1960

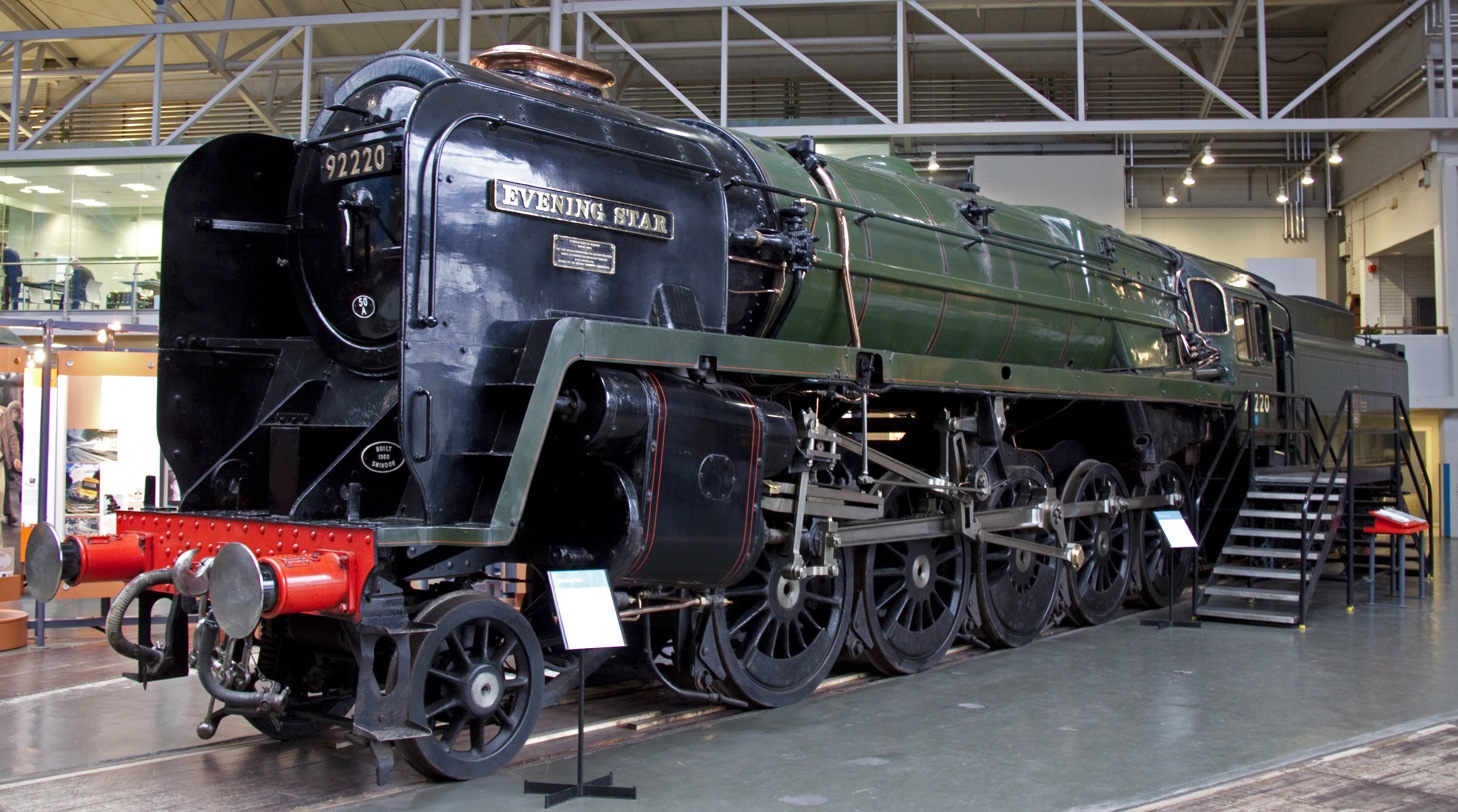
- 92220 Evening Star on display at the National Railway Museum
Type and origin
- Power type: Steam
- Designer: R.A. Riddles
- Builder: Swindon Works
- Build date: March 1960
Specifications
- Configuration
  - Whyte: 2-10-0
  - UIC: 1′E h2
- Gauge: 4 ft 8 1/2 in (1,435 mm)
- Wheel diameter: 5 ft 0 in (1.524 m)
- Length: 66 ft 2 in (20.17 m) overall
- Loco weight: 86 long tons 14 cwt (194,200 lb or 88.1 t)
- Tender type: BR1G
- Fuel capacity: 9 long tons 0 cwt (20,200 lb or 9.1 t)
- Water cap.: 4,725 imp gal (21,480 L; 5,674 US gal)
- Boiler pressure: 250 lbf/in^{2} (1.72 MPa)
- Cylinders: Two, outside
- Cylinder size: 20 in × 28 in (508 mm × 711 mm)
Performance figures
- Tractive effort: 39,667 lbf (176.45 kN)
Career
- Operators: British Railways
- Power class: 9F
- Numbers: 92220
- Locale: Western Region of British Railways
- Withdrawn: March 1965
- Current owner: National Railway Museum

BR Standard Class 9F number 92220 Evening Star is a preserved British steam locomotive completed in 1960. It was the last steam locomotive to be built by British Railways. It was the only British main line steam locomotive earmarked for preservation from the date of construction. It was the 999th locomotive of the whole British Railways Standard range.

== Construction ==
Evening Star was built at Swindon Works in 1960. Though the last to be built, it was not the last 9F numerically as Crewe Works had already completed engines with higher numbers. It was equipped with a BR1G-type tender and given BR Locomotive Green livery, normally reserved for passenger locomotives, and was completed with a copper-capped double chimney. All other members of the class of heavy freight locomotives were painted unlined black.

=== Naming ===
92220 was the only Class 9F to be named when running with BR, although other 9Fs have subsequently been named in preservation.

The name Evening Star was chosen following a competition run in 1959-60 by the BR Western Region Staff Magazine. There were three competition winners, Driver T.M. Phillips (Aberystwyth), Boilermaker J.S. Sathi (Old Oak Common) and F.L. Pugh (Paddington), who had all suggested Evening Star.

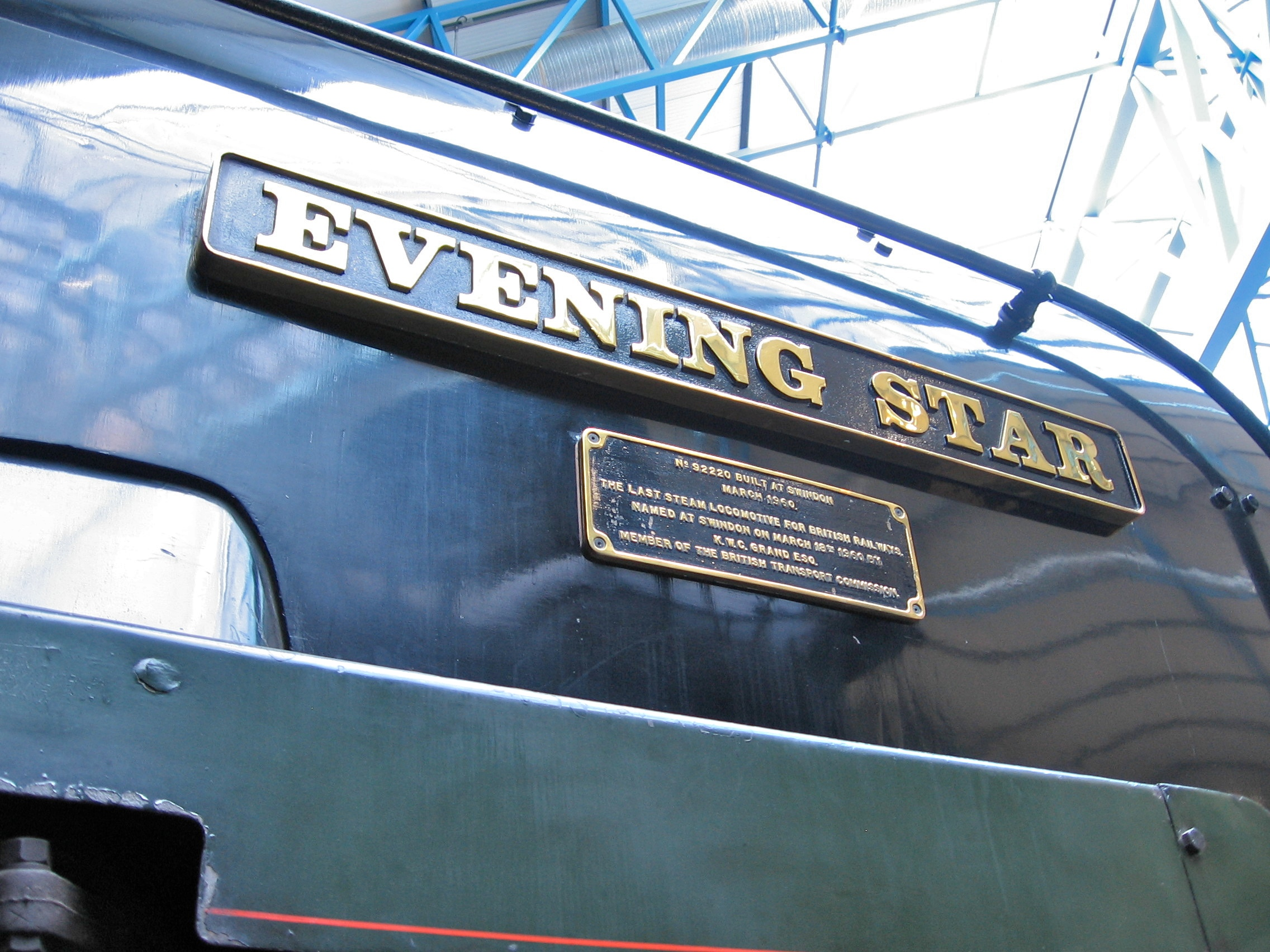
Nameplate and plaque

A special commemorative plate was affixed below the nameplate on the smoke deflectors. The commemorative plate reads:

No. 92220 built at Swindon
March 1960
The last steam locomotive for British Railways
Named at Swindon on March 18, 1960 by
K.W.C. Grand, Esq
Member of the British Transport Commission

The wooden patterns for this commemorative plate and the engine's name plate were both carved by pattern maker Fred Marsh.

==== Naming ceremony ====
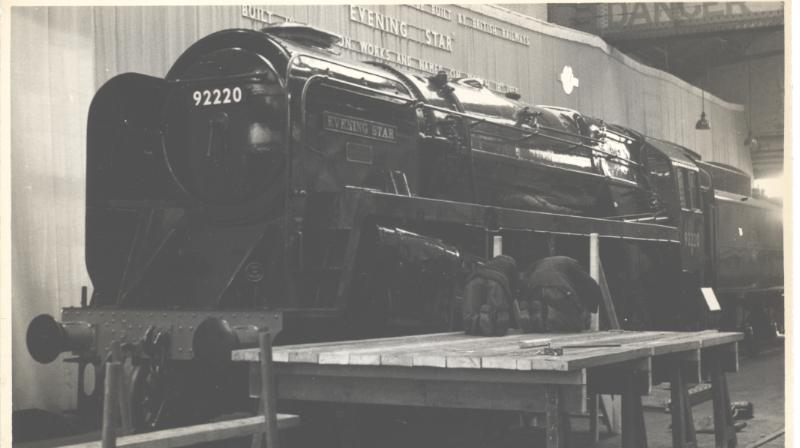
92220 Evening Star stands at Swindon Works on 20 March 1960, soon after the naming ceremony

The naming ceremony took place on 18 March 1960 at the Swindon Works, where the locomotive was built. A speech was given by R.F. Hanks, Chairman of the Western Area Board of British Transport Commission:

But it is also a very great day for Swindon, and, to my friends from other Regions and from the B.T.C., I trust I shall not be considered parochial when I say that it is a proud day for Great Western men everywhere who will find much satisfaction, since there had to be a "last one" that it should fall to the lot of Swindon to see the job through. [..] I am sure it has been truly said that no other product of man’s mind has ever exercised such a compelling hold upon the public’s imagination as the steam locomotive. No other machine, in its day, has been a more faithful friend to mankind and has contributed more to the cause of industrial prosperity in this, the land of its birth, and throughout the world.

— R.F. Hanks (18 March 1960),

The loco was then named by Keith Grand of the British Transport Commission, by the unveiling of the nameplate, naming it Evening Star.

== In service ==
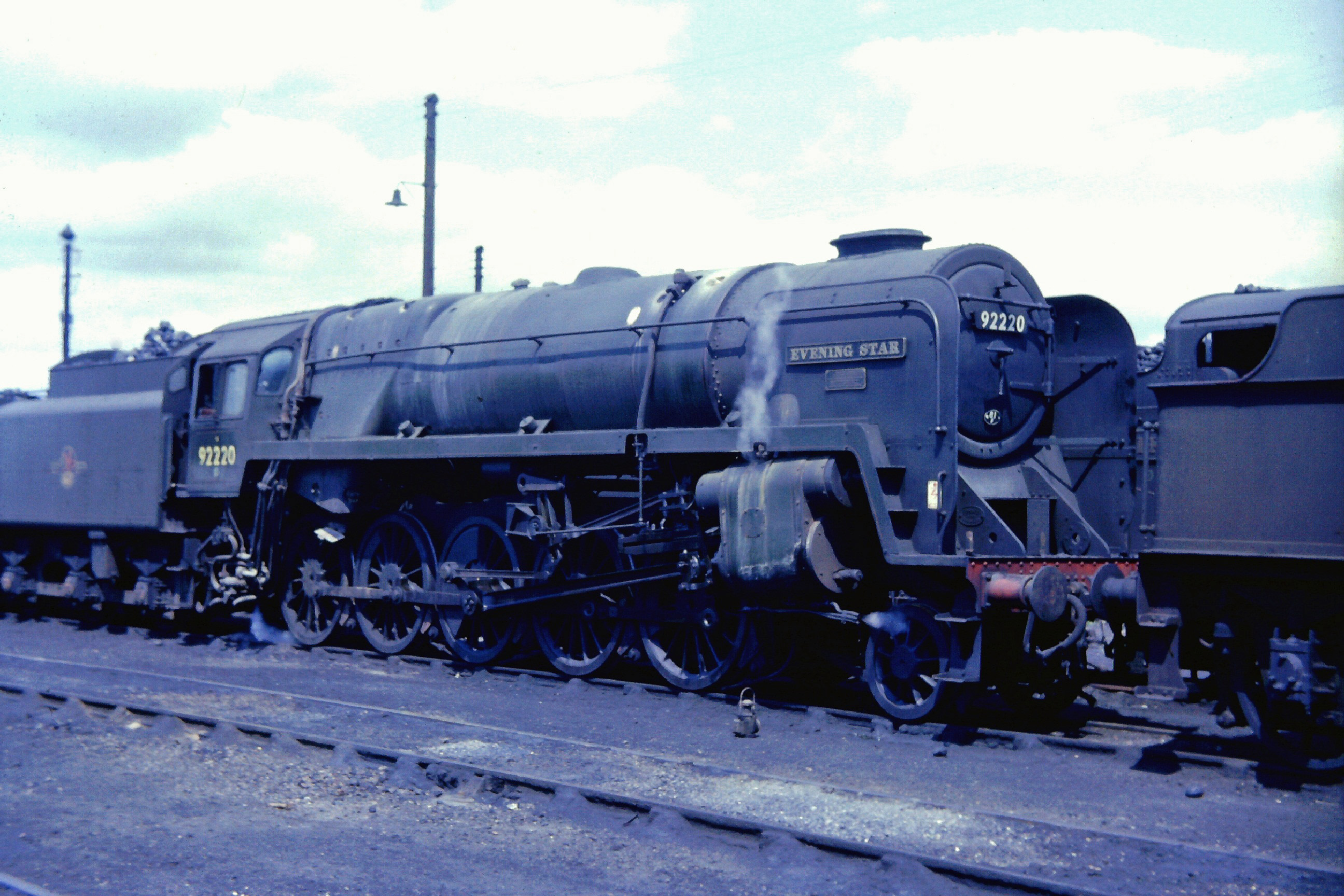
92220 Evening Star at Oxford MPD in 1964

92220 was used over the Western Region and over the Somerset & Dorset Joint Railway line. Its main duties were as a heavy freight locomotive. However, 92220 was never just any locomotive, its working was closely controlled "to ensure she returned home regularly for cleaning and maintenance in view of the special workings and exhibitions for which the engine was required".

On 27–28 June and 1 July 1960, No. 92220, then allocated to Cardiff Canton shed, hauled the BR Western Region's flagship Paddington to Cardiff, Swansea, Neyland and Fishguard Harbour passenger express trains, the London bound Red Dragon and the return Capitals United Express between Cardiff and Paddington, reportedly having to delay its arrival at Paddington to allow for completion of restaurant services because it was running so early; easily outperforming the regular Britannia passenger express locomotives, which it was observed overtaking (while hauling a full rake of 10+ passenger express coaches) on several occasions. However, its career on these flagship services was cut short, by order of BR senior management, allegedly from fear of damage to its running gear which wasn't designed for extended high speed express work. BR management's embargo, issued after they received word of the runs on 27–28 June, wasn't enforced until after driver Eddie Broom, head of Canton Shed's Local Departmental Committee (the local branch shop steward of ASLEF, the Associated Society of Locomotive Engineers and Firemen's extremely powerful trades union), had his turn on 92220's down Capitals United Express run, on 1 July 1960.

On 16 July 1962 and 18 July 1962, the locomotive was photographed at Gloucester Barnwood shed yard, and on 8 September 1962 it hauled the last Pines Express on the Somerset & Dorset Joint Railway. Evening Star was recorded hauling passenger express trains at over 90 mph (140 km/h) on its Red Dragon and Capitals United Express runs. 92220 was withdrawn in 1965 and stored at Severn Tunnel Junction Marshalling Yard, after incurring minor damage in a shunting accident at Cardiff Docks. It had a working life of just five years and one day which was the shortest operational life of all 251 class members. It was subsequently preserved as part of the National Collection. In late 1966, the locomotive, by then in decrepit condition, was towed to Crewe Works via Shrewsbury for overhaul and restoration.

== Preservation ==
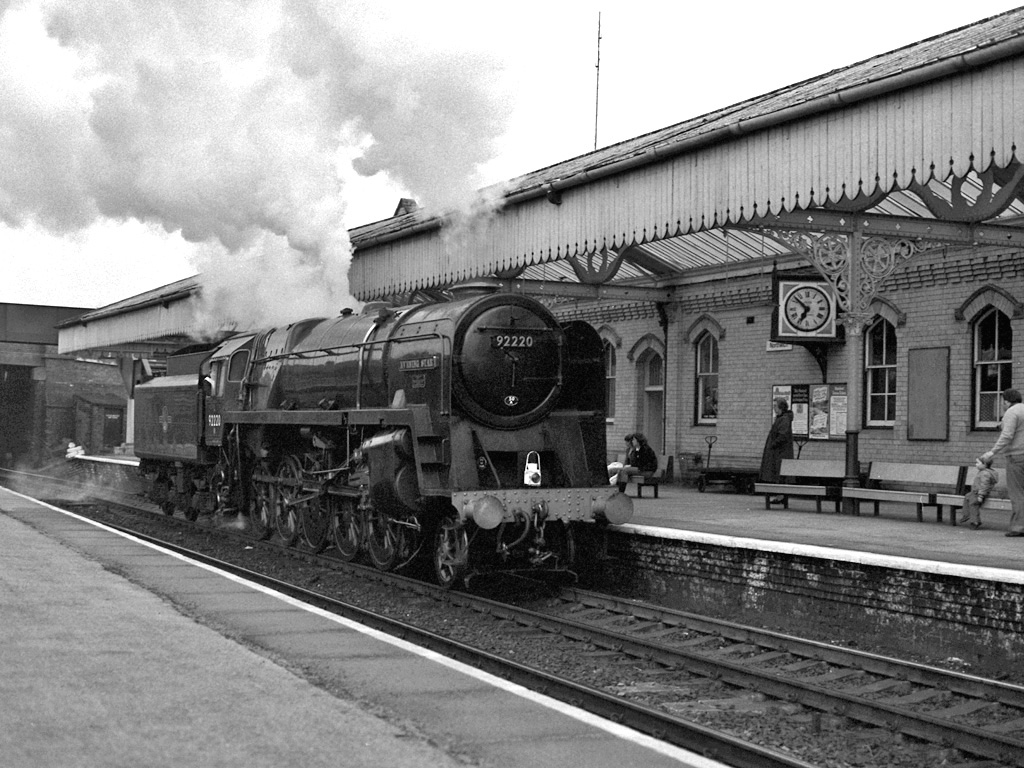
92220 passes through Northwich station to the National Railway Museum on 21 May 1983

The front of the engine, at the National Railway Museum

Evening Star remained in operation into the 1980s and is one of nine surviving 9Fs. From July 1973 it operated on the Keighley & Worth Valley Railway, moving to the National Railway Museum, York in May 1975. In 1986 it was loaned to the North Yorkshire Moors Railway and in 1989 to the West Somerset Railway. Since withdrawal, it has been a static exhibit at the National Railway Museum.

After a brief period displayed at the National Railway Museum Shildon, the engine returned to its birthplace, Swindon Works, on 3 September 2008. Evening Star remained on display for two years at the Swindon Steam Railway Museum to celebrate its 50th anniversary. It returned to the National Railway Museum in 2010, whilst the GWR locomotive No. 4003 Lode Star took its place at Swindon.

== Other locomotives named Evening Star ==
- A 2-2-2 Star Class locomotive operated by the Great Western Railway, built in 1839
- A 4000 Class locomotive operated by GWR, built in 1907
- British Rail Class 90 No.90013, built by Crewe Works, and named in July 2010 by National Express East Anglia at Ipswich after a local newspaper.
- British Rail Class 66 No.66689, last member of its class, named by GB Railfreight in May 2016

== See also ==
- List of preserved BR Standard Class 9F locomotives
- The Indian WG class locomotive no. 10560 Antim Sitara — the last broad gauge steam locomotive built in India, had a similar name, meaning "The Last Star"

== Bibliography ==
- Derry, Richard (2006). Book of the 9F 2-10-0s. Irwell Press. ISBN 978-1-903266-73-1.
- Ellis, C. Hamilton (1968). The Pictorial Encyclopedia of Railways. The Hamlyn Publishing Group. pp. 358–359.
- le Fleming, H.M. (November 1960) [1953]. White, D.E. (ed.). The Locomotives of the Great Western Railway, part eight: Modern Passenger Classes (2nd ed.). Kenilworth: RCTS. OCLC 500544523.
- Reed, P. J. T. (February 1953). White, D. E. (ed.). The Locomotives of the Great Western Railway, Part 2: Broad Gauge. Kenilworth: RCTS. ISBN 0-901115-32-0. OCLC 650490992.
- Walford, John; Harrison, Paul (2008). Volume Four: The 9F 2-10-0 Class. A Detailed History of British Railways Standard Steam Locomotives. Bristol: RCTS. ISBN 978-0-901115-95-9.
