= LGBTQ rights in Burkina Faso =

- Burkina Faso
- Legal status: Illegal since 2025
- Penalty: 2 to 5 years imprisonment; fine
- Gender identity: No
- Discrimination protections: None

Family rights
- Recognition of relationships: No
- Adoption: No

Lesbian, gay, bisexual, transgender, and queer (LGBTQ) people in Burkina Faso face severe legal challenges not experienced by non-LGBTQ residents. Since 1 September 2025, same-sex sexual acts and the promotion of same-sex sexual acts have been criminalised with severe legal penalties, while the pre-existing bans against same-sex marriage or adoption rights remain in force.

== Laws regarding same-sex sexual acts ==
Prior to 2025, male and female types of same-sex sexual activity had always been legal in Burkina Faso, with an equal age of consent implemented in 1996. In July 2024, the military junta led by Ibrahim Traoré, which has been in power since the September 2022 Burkina Faso coup d'état, adopted an amended family code draft which would make consensual same-sex relations and the promotion of such a criminal offense.

Since 1 September 2025, the new criminal code has come into force banning any homosexual acts and promotion of homosexuality or "similar" behaviour (i.e. LGBTQ activities) with 2 to 5 years in prison and a fine as punishment. Foreign nationals who violate the law will be deported. The legislation was passed unanimously by the unelected 71-member transitional parliament. The legislation took effect immediately.

== Recognition of same-sex unions ==
The Constitution of Burkina Faso does not authorize same-sex marriage and defines marriage as a union between a man and a woman. Article 23 states:

La famille est la cellule de base de la société. L'Etat lui doit protection. Le mariage est fondé sur le libre consentement de l'homme et de la femme. Toute discrimination fondée sur la race, la couleur, la religion, l'ethnie, la caste, l'origine sociale, la fortune est interdite en matière de mariage. Les enfants sont égaux en droits et en devoirs dans leurs relations familiales. Les parents ont le droit naturel et le devoir d'élever et d'éduquer leurs enfants. Ceux-ci leur doivent respect et assistance.

[The family is the basic unit of society. The State owes it protection. Marriage is based on the free consent of both the man and the woman. All discrimination based on race, colour, religion, ethnicity, caste, social origin, or wealth is prohibited in matters of marriage. Children are equal in rights and responsibilities within their family relationships. Parents have the natural right and the duty to raise and educate their children. Children owe them respect and support.]

— Constitution of Burkina Faso (1991)

== Adoption and family planning ==
According to the U.S. Department of State, "Married, cohabiting, heterosexual couples who have been married for at least five years may adopt a child. Single applicants are almost never permitted to adopt children in Burkina Faso."

== Living conditions ==
The U.S. Department of State's 2011 Human Rights Report found that,

The law does not discriminate on the basis of sexual orientation in employment and occupation, housing, statelessness, or access to education or health care. However, societal discrimination based on sexual orientation and gender identity remained a problem. Religious and traditional beliefs do not accept homosexuality, and lesbian, gay, bisexual, and transgender (LGBT) persons were reportedly occasional victims of verbal and physical abuse. There were no reports that the government responded to societal violence and discrimination against such persons. LGBTQ organizations had no legal presence in the country but existed unofficially. There were no reports of government or societal violence against such organizations.

=== HIV/AIDS ===
HIV/AIDS has a relatively low presence in Burkina Faso when compared to other African nations, with 0.80% of adults aged 15–49 infected by the virus. While the infection rate is low, HIV remains a serious threat in Burkina Faso due to inadequate access to antiretroviral drugs: Only 65% of the estimated 94,000 adults living with HIV have access to such drugs; while only 28% of children aged 0–14 have access. These access rates trail many other African nations. Despite this, antiretroviral coverage has significantly improved in the country; the estimated coverage for all ages was 32% in 2010.

== Summary table ==
Same-sex sexual activity legal	No (Penalty: 2 to 5 years imprisonment; fine.)
Freedom of expression, freedom from censorship	No ("Promotion" of same-sex sexual activity illegal)
Equal age of consent (18)	No (Since September 2025)
Anti-discrimination laws in hate speech and violence	No
Anti-discrimination laws in employment	No
Anti-discrimination laws in the provision of goods and services	No
Same-sex marriage	No
Recognition of same-sex couples	No
Step-child adoption by same-sex couples	No
Joint adoption by same-sex couples	No
Gays and lesbians allowed to serve openly in the military	
Right to change legal gender	
Access to IVF for lesbians	
Commercial surrogacy for gay male couples	No
MSMs allowed to donate blood	No

== See also ==
- Human rights in Burkina Faso
- LGBTQ rights in Africa
