= Chisbury =

Hamlet in Wiltshire, England

Coordinates: 51.395°N 1.603°W

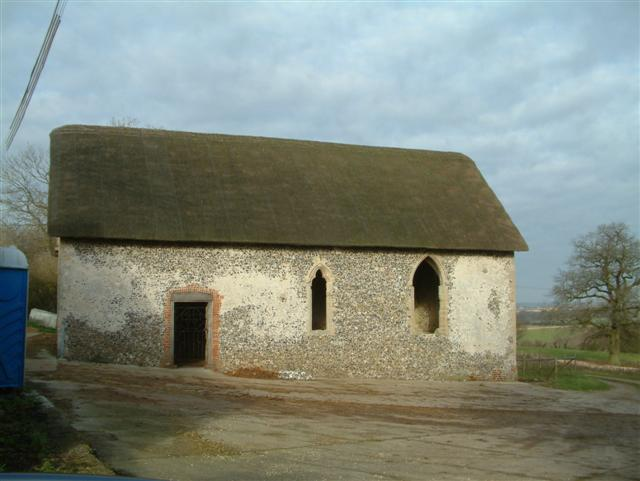
- St. Martin's Chapel

- Location within Wiltshire
- OS grid reference: SU277663
- Civil parish: Little Bedwyn
- Unitary authority: Wiltshire
- Ceremonial county: Wiltshire
- Region: South West
- Country: England
- Sovereign state: United Kingdom
- Post town: Marlborough
- Postcode district: SN8
- Dialling code: 01672
- Police: Wiltshire
- Fire: Dorset and Wiltshire
- Ambulance: South Western
- UK Parliament: East Wiltshire

Chisbury is a hamlet and prehistoric hill fort in the civil parish of Little Bedwyn in Wiltshire, England. Chisbury is about 4 miles (6 km) west of Hungerford and about 6 miles (10 km) south-east of Marlborough.

== History ==
At 176 metres (577 ft) above sea level, Chisbury hillfort is the highest point in Little Bedwyn parish and encloses an area of about 14 acres (5.7 ha). Palaeolithic, Neolithic and Bronze Age artefacts have been found in the area, but the hillfort was most probably built in the late Iron Age in the 1st century AD. There may be a link with the 7th-century West Saxon nobleman Cissa. The hillfort was re-used in the Anglo-Saxon times as a burh, cited as Cyssanbyrig in the Burghal Hidage document which lists the fortifications of Wessex in the later part of the 9th century, although Julian Orbach cautions that this may be a misreading for Tisbury.

St. Martin's chapel, on the eastern edge of the hillfort, seems to have been built in the early part of the 13th century. After the middle of the 16th century the building lapsed from use for worship and was turned into a barn. It was re-roofed in the 19th century but in 1998 its condition was semi-ruinous. The hillfort and chapel were designated as a scheduled ancient monument in 1925.

Chisbury Manor farmhouse, also within the hillfort site, is a two-storey brick building from the mid 18th century.

Knowle Farm, about 1.5 miles (2.4 km) northwest of Chisbury, has a 14th-century chapel which is now an outbuilding of the farmhouse. A blocked ogee-headed north window and the surround of the east window are the only surviving features. The farmhouse is a brick-built Georgian house of five bays dated 1735.

== Sources and further reading ==
- Aston, Michael; Bond, James (1976). The Landscape of Towns. Archaeology in the Field Series. London: J.M. Dent & Sons Ltd. pp. 59, 60. ISBN 0-460-04194-0.
- Baggs, A P; Freeman, J; Smith, C; Stevenson, J H; Williamson, E (1999). Crowley, D.A. (ed.). "Victoria County History: Wiltshire: Vol 16 pp50-69 – Little Bedwyn". British History Online. University of London.
- Pevsner, Nikolaus; Cherry, Bridget (revision) (1975) [1963]. Wiltshire. The Buildings of England. Harmondsworth: Penguin Books. pp. 174–175, 463. ISBN 0140710264.
