= St Mary's Church, Great Bedwyn =

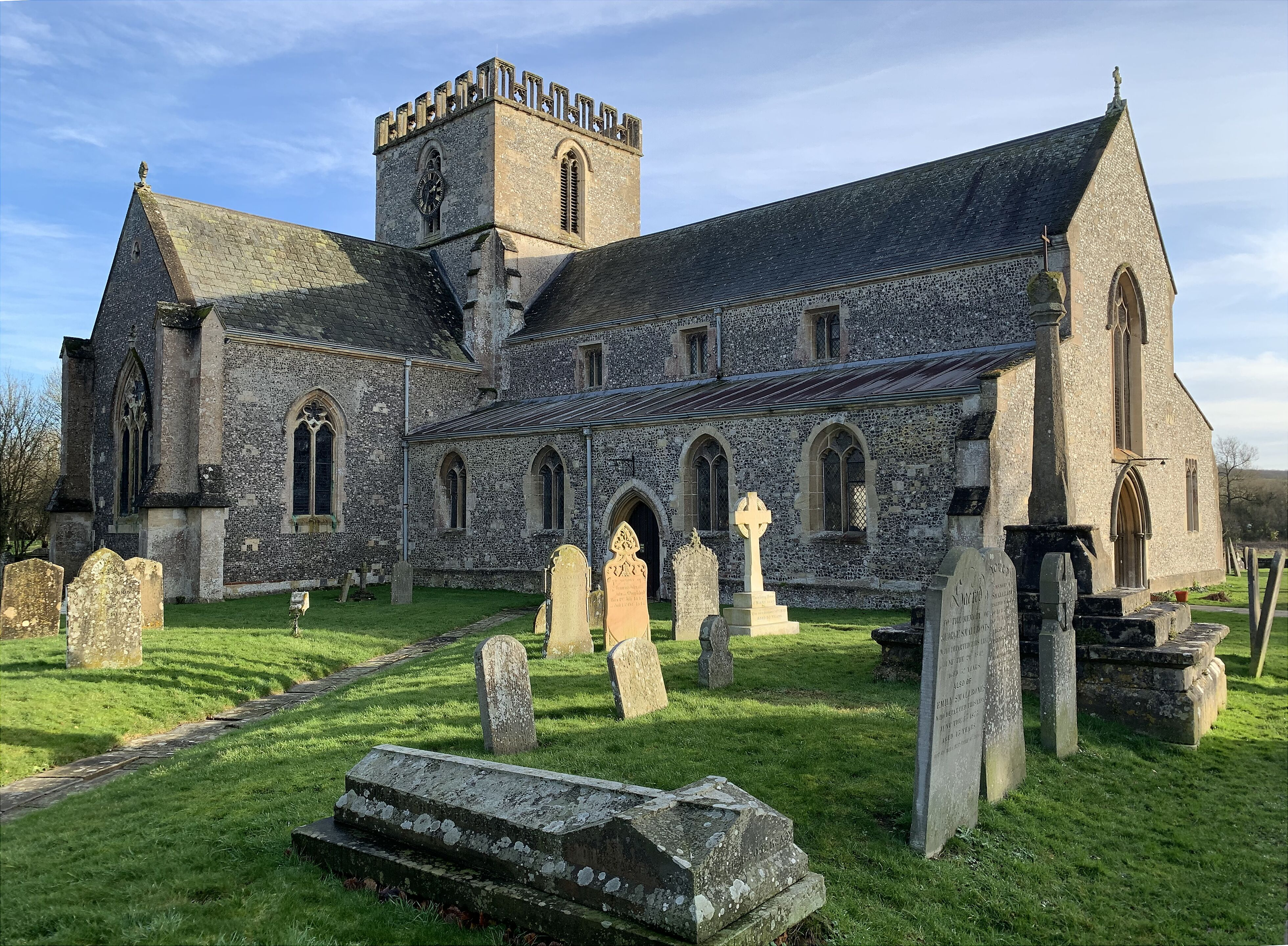
- St. Mary's Church, Great Bedwyn; cross shaft in right foreground
- St Mary's Church, Great Bedwyn
- 51°22′37″N 1°36′09″W
- OS grid reference: SU 27756 64277
- Location: Great Bedwyn
- Country: England
- Denomination: Church of England

Architecture
- Heritage designation: Grade I listed
- Style: Norman, Early English
- Years built: 12th century

Administration
- Province: Canterbury
- Diocese: Salisbury
- Archdeaconry: Wilts
- Deanery: Pewsey
- Parish: Great Bedwyn

Clergy
- Vicar: Revd Michael McHugh

The Church of Saint Mary the Virgin is the parish church of Great Bedwyn, Wiltshire, England, and a Grade I listed building. The church was built in the Norman style in the 12th century, but beneath the existing building are Saxon remains dating back to the 10th century. The church boasts a handsome memorial to Sir John Seymour, father of King Henry VIII's wife Jane Seymour, and grandfather of King Edward VI.

== History ==
The church has Anglo-Saxon origins. In A.D. 905, the bishop of Winchester purchased land in Great Bedwyn to build a church. Beneath the existing church are the substantial remains of a Saxon church.

=== Norman era ===
The Domesday survey of 1086 recorded a church at Beduinde, held by Brictward the priest, with church lands worth one and a half hides. Income from the church, along with St. Michael's at Little Bedwyn, was granted to Salisbury Cathedral in 1091.

=== 16th century ===
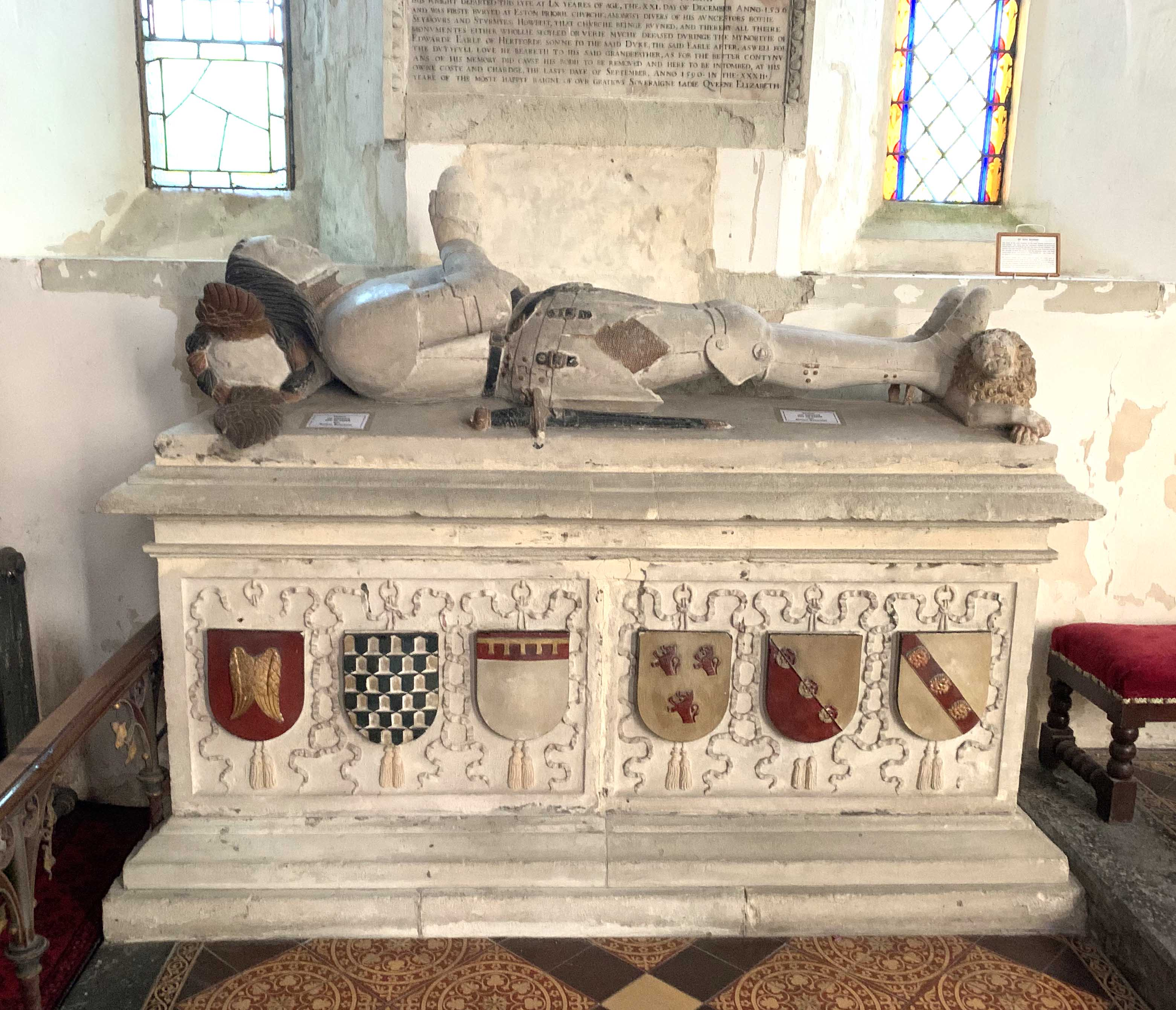
Tomb of John Seymour, grandfather of King Edward VI

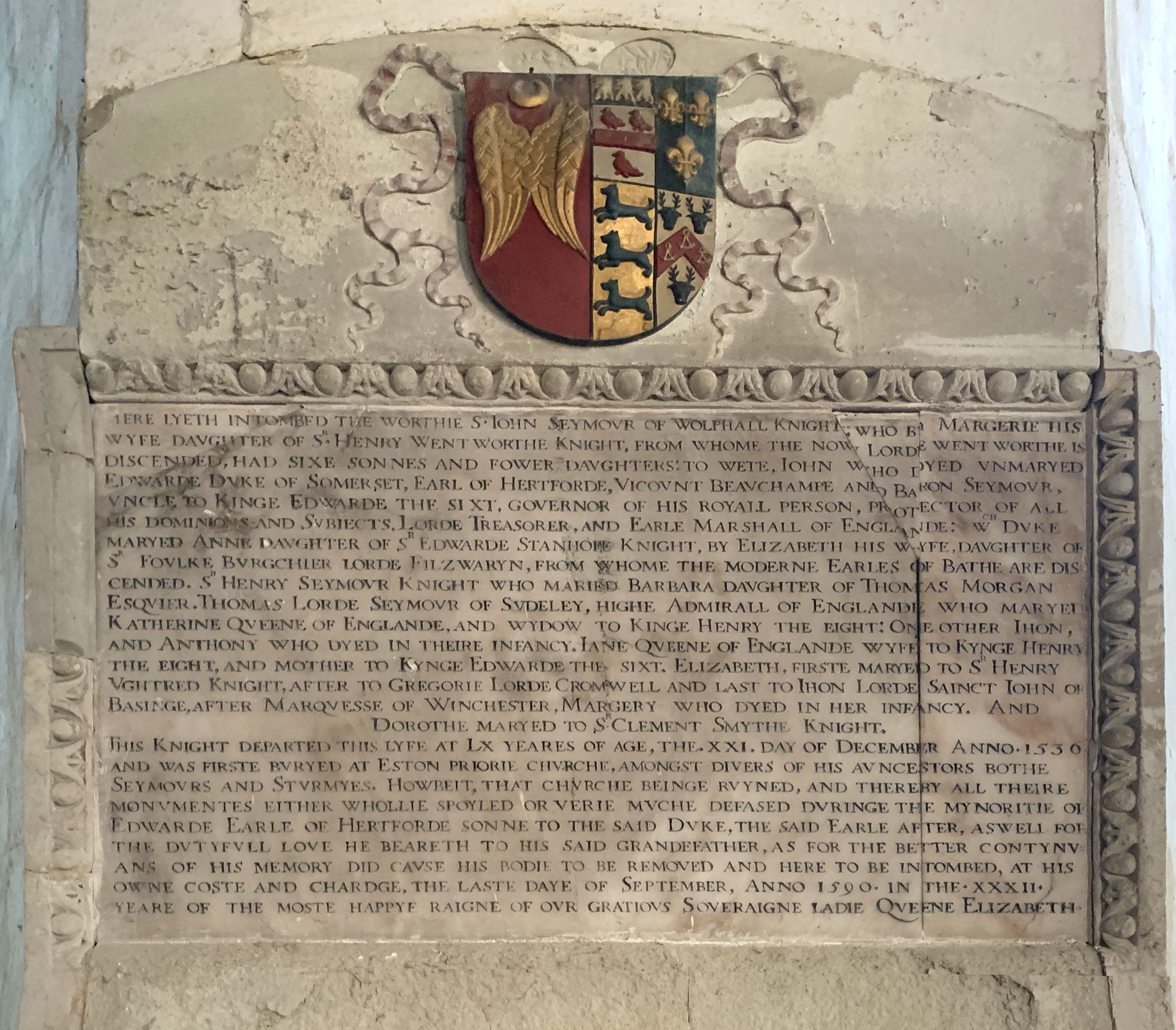
Sir John Seymour memorial

In the chancel is a memorial to Sir John Seymour (1474–1536), father of King Henry VIII's wife Jane Seymour, father to Edward Seymour, 1st Duke of Somerset, and grandfather of King Edward VI.

Seymour's monument – removed from Easton Royal priory in 1590 – consists of a chest tomb displaying heraldic escutcheons, surmounted by his recumbent effigy, fully dressed in armour with hands in prayer, his head resting on his helm from which projects the sculpted Seymour crest of a pair of wings. His feet rest on a lion and a sword lies by his side. On the wall above is fixed a tablet inscribed as follows:

Here lyeth intombed the worthie Sr John Seymour of Wolfhall, Knight, who by Margerie his wyfe, daughter of Sr Henry Wentworthe, Knight, from whome the nowe Lorde Wentworthe is discended, had sixe sonnes and fower daughters, to wete, John who dyed unmaryed; Edwarde, Duke of Somerset, Earl of Hertforde, Vicount Beauchampe and Baron Seymour, uncle to Kinge Edwarde the Sixt, Governor of his Royall Person, Protector of all his Dominions and Subjects, Lorde Treasorer and Earle Marshall of Englande; w(i)ch Duke maryed Anne, daughter of Sr Edwarde Stanhope, Knight, by Elizabeth his wyfe, daughter of Sr Foulke Burgchier, Lorde Filzwaryn, (sic) from whome the moderne Earles of Bathe are discended; Sr Henry Seymour, Knight, who maried Barbara daughter of Thomas Morgan, Esquier; Thomas Lorde Seymour of Sudeley, Highe Admirall of Englande, who maryed Katherine, Queene of Englande, and wydow to Kinge Henry the Eight. One other Jhon, and Anthony, who dyed in theire infancy. Jane Qveene of Englande, wyfe to Kynge Henry the Eight, and mother to Kynge Edwarde the Sixt; Elizabeth, firste maryed to Sr Henry Ughtred,(sic) Knight, after to Gregorie, Lorde Cromwell, and last to Jhon Lorde Sainct John of Basinge,(sic) after Marquesse of Winchester; Margery, who dyed in her infancy, and Dorothe, maryed to Sr Clement Smythe, Knight. This Knight departed this lyfe at LX yeares of age, the XXI day of December, Anno 1536, and was firste buryed at Eston Priorie Churche amongst divers of his auncestors, bothe Seymours and Sturmyes. Howbeit that Churche beinge ruyned, and thereby all theire monumentes either whollie spoyled, or verie much defased duringe the mynoritie of Edwarde, Earle of Hertforde, sonne to the said Duke, the said Earle after, as well for the dutyfull love he beareth to his said grandefather, as for the better contynuans of his memory, did cause his bodie to be removed, and here to be intombed at his own coste and chardge, the laste daye of September, Anno 1590, in the XXXII yeare of the moste happye raigne of our gratious Soveraigne Ladie Queene Elizabeth.

A transcript was made of the inscriptions of the Seymour monuments by the topographer John Aubrey on his visit to the church in 1672, who also recorded the heraldry on the monument at that date, much of which has been lost.

=== 17th century ===
Thomas Willis (1621–1675), the great Oxford physician and natural philosopher, was born at Great Bedwyn on 27 January 1621 and was baptized on 14 February at the church.

Still present in the church today is the elegant tomb of Frances Seymour, Duchess of Somerset (1599–1674), the daughter of Robert Devereux, 2nd Earl of Essex, a favourite of Queen Elizabeth I, who was executed for treason in 1601. Frances Seymour was the second wife of William Seymour, 2nd Duke of Somerset, and the mother of his seven children.

== Architecture ==
The cruciform church is built in flint with limestone dressings. Nikolaus Pevsner writes that the crossing tower is "of just the right height in relation to nave, chancel and transepts", but notes the lack of early details to the exterior.

The arcades are from the late 12th century, although Pevsner says Wyatt's work in the 19th century left the capitals "over-restored". The chancel was rebuilt and made longer in the late 13th century. The tower is early 14th century (its openwork battlements added later) and the crossing and transepts were added around the same time. The end windows of the transepts have ogee tracery, in a barbed design which is also found at the cruciform church at Downton and at Malmesbury Abbey. Restoration in 1853–5 by the diocesan architect T.H. Wyatt included new roofs throughout.

== Interior ==
In the south transept are two early 14th-century tomb recesses. In one of them lies a stone effigy of a knight with shield and drawn sword, said to be Sir Adam de Stokke (died 1313), the builder of the transepts. In the 1850s the 14th-century oak chancel screen was removed (it is now across the north transept) and replaced by rails delicately made in wrought iron.

Wyatt provided a stone font and pulpit, in a style called "muscular Gothic" by Julian Orbach in his update of Pevsner's book. The 15th-century font was transferred to Weston, Hertfordshire.

All six bells are from the 17th century, the oldest cast by John Wallis at the Salisbury foundry in 1623. There is also a sanctus bell made in 1741 by John Cor at Aldbourne.

== Churchyard ==
North-west of the church stands the Grade II* listed base and shaft of a 14th-century limestone churchyard cross, capped with a 17th-century polyhedral sundial. Nearby, facing the entrance from Church Street, is the parish war memorial of c.1920: a tall shaft has an ornately carved cross, and a three-sided wall carries the names of those killed in the First World War.

Chest tombs include several for the Tanners of Wexcombe (dated 1797 to 1845) and another for Elizabeth Pinckney of Tidcombe (1800).

== Prebend and parish ==
From the late 11th century, the Bedwyn prebendary at Salisbury was rector of Bedwyn church. The prebendary had the status of an archdeacon, with jurisdiction over Great Bedwyn, Little Bedwyn and later Collingbourne Ducis parishes; this became known as the peculiar of the Lord Warden of Savernake Forest. After the prebend was dissolved in 1543 the jurisdiction and its visitation court continued, only ceasing in 1847. The prebendal manor was part of the Tottenham House estate from 1567, until the land was sold to the Crown in 1950 by the 6th Marquess of Ailesbury.

A vicarage had been ordained at Bedwyn by 1316. The ancient parish had a wide extent, and at one time or another there were chapels of ease at East Grafton, Marten, Wilton, Little Bedwyn, Chisbury and Knowle (near Chisbury); only the buildings at Little Bedwyn and Chisbury stand today, although the latter chapel fell out of use after 1547. In the 16th century or perhaps earlier, Little Bedwyn became a separate parish. In 1844 a church was built at East Grafton and the southern part of Great Bedwyn parish assigned to it, then in 1864 a north-western part was transferred to the new church of St. Katharine on the Tottenham House estate.

In 1982 the benefices of Great Bedwyn, Little Bedwyn, and St. Katharine were united. Today the parish is within the area of the Savernake Team, a group of eleven village parishes.

== Gallery ==
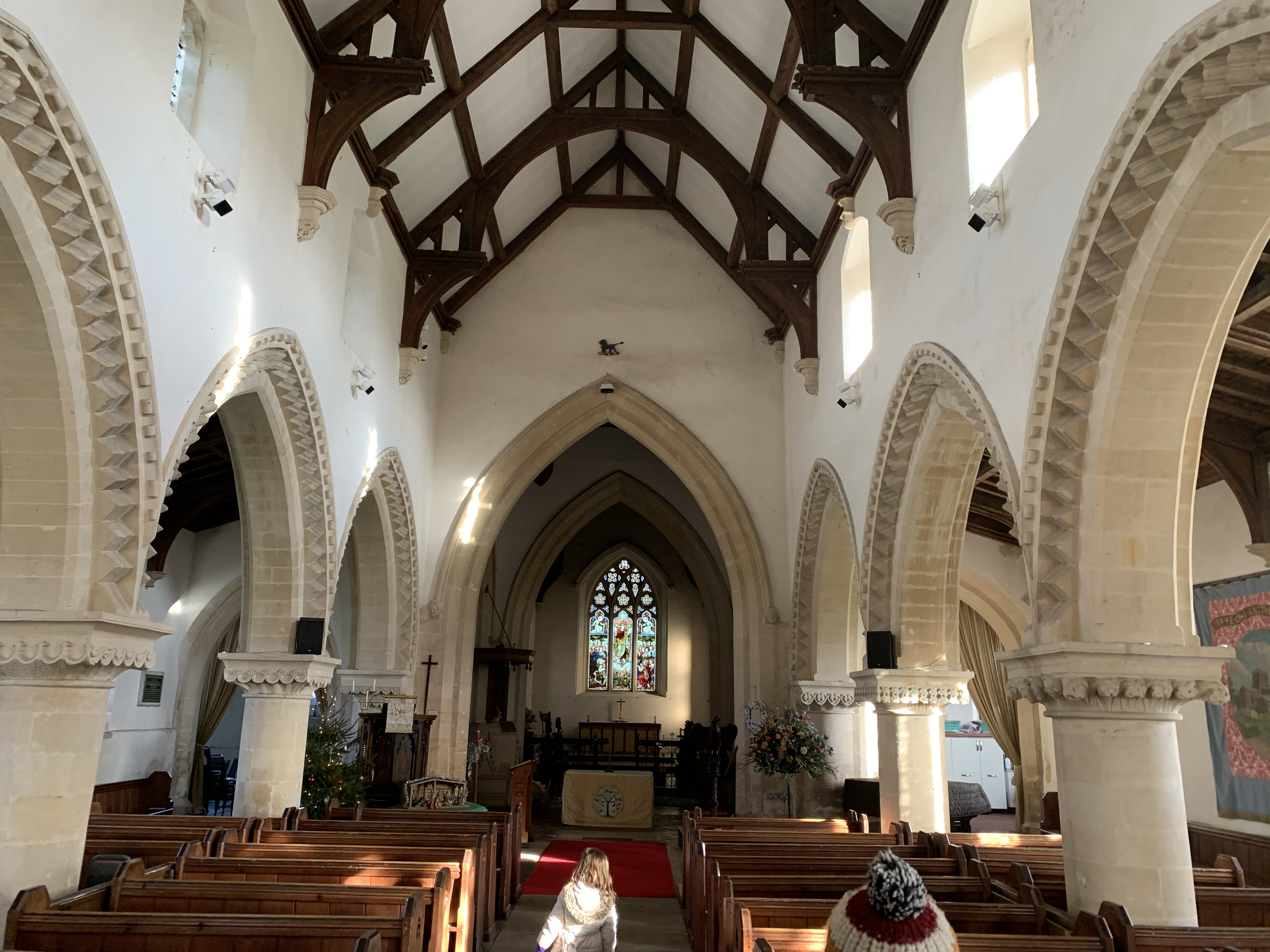
St. Mary's, Great Bedwin, interior

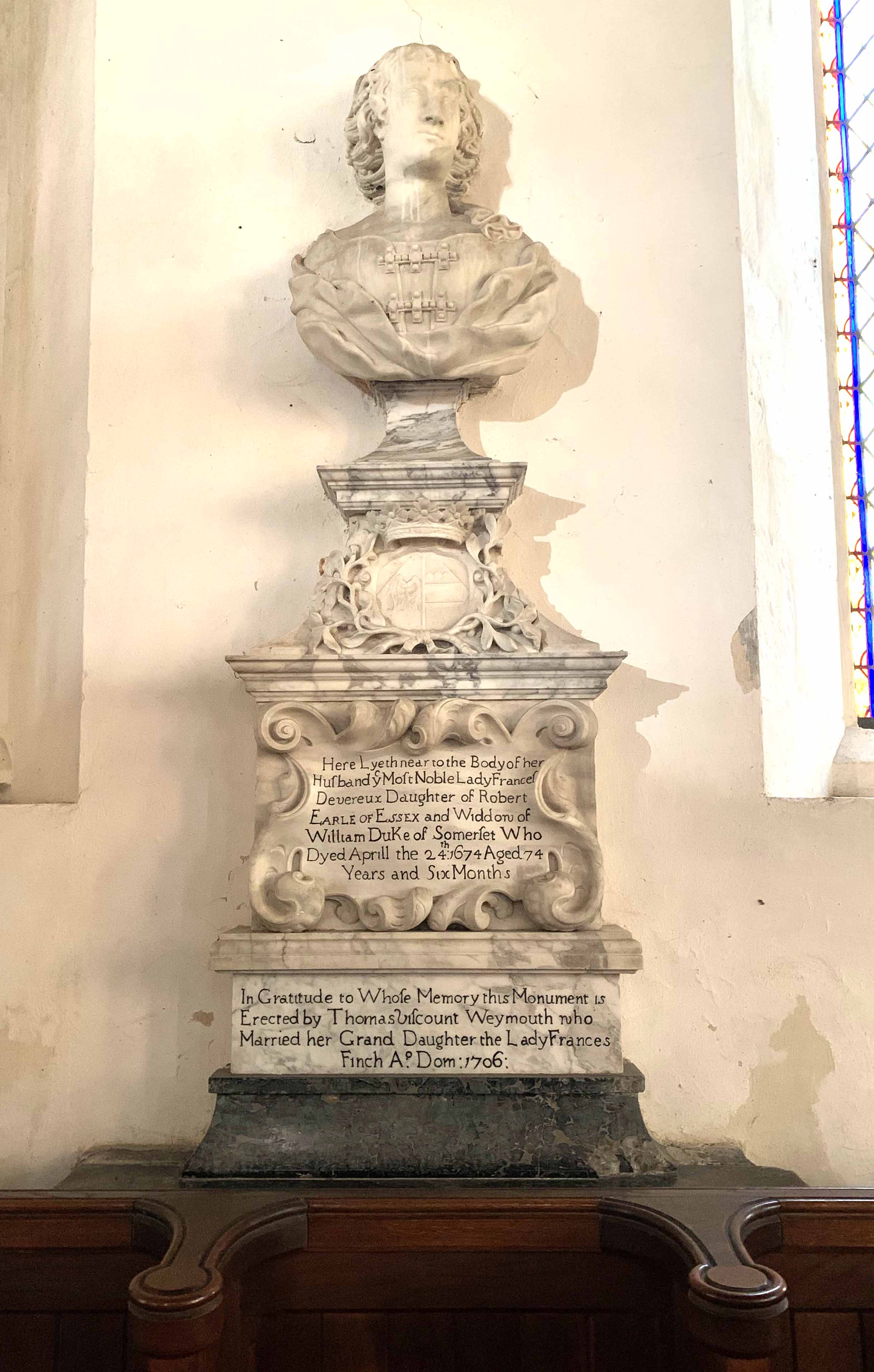
Tomb of Frances Seymour, Duchess of Somerset, widow of William Seymour, 2nd Duke of Somerset
