= Human trafficking in Burkina Faso =

Burkina Faso serves as a country of origin, transit, and destination for trafficking, primarily involving children subjected to forced labor and forced prostitution.

In 2009, the Government of Burkina Faso’s Ministry of Social Action reported that security forces intercepted 788 children, including 619 boys, destined for exploitation in countries like Côte d'Ivoire, Mali, and Niger. Within Burkina Faso, child victims in cities such as Ouagadougou, Bobo-Dioulasso, Nouna, and Houndé faced forced labor in plantations, mining, cocoa farms, domestic service, begging at unaccredited Koranic schools, or prostitution.

To a lesser extent, traffickers lured Burkinabe women to Europe for nonconsensual commercial sexual exploitation. Women from Nigeria, Togo, Benin, and Niger migrated to Burkina Faso with promises of legitimate work but faced forced labor in bars or prostitution.

The U.S. State Department’s Office to Monitor and Combat Trafficking in Persons placed Burkina Faso on the "Tier 2 Watchlist" in 2017 and upgraded it to Tier 2 in 2023. In 2023, the Organised Crime Index rated trafficking severity at 7 out of 10. Burkina Faso ratified the 2000 UN TIP Protocol in May 2002.

== Prosecution ==
A May 2008 law prohibited all forms of trafficking, with penalties of 20 years to life imprisonment, comparable to those for crimes such as rape. As of 2010, no evidence showed government officials’ involvement in trafficking, though some corrupt law enforcement agents may have facilitated related activities.

== Protection ==
As of 2010, the government offered limited direct services to trafficking victims. It processed travel documents for foreign victims’ safe return and collaborated with NGOs to facilitate repatriation. Burkinabe law allows victims to pursue legal action against traffickers; no such cases or victim-assisted prosecutions were reported in 2009. The government provided no legal alternatives to deporting foreign victims to countries where they might face hardship. Efforts to educate law enforcement on child trafficking occurred, but no formal programs trained officials to identify victims. Distinguishing between voluntary child migrants and trafficking victims remained challenging for officials and citizens.

== Prevention ==
The government partnered with NGOs and international organizations to sustain anti-trafficking campaigns, reaching approximately 600,000 people. It distributed booklets outlining the anti-TIP National Action Plan, but struggled to implement it. In 2009, the mayor of Ouagadougou closed 37 brothels to curb demand for commercial sex acts. The government trained Burkinabe military troops on human rights and trafficking before their deployment as international peacekeepers.

== See also ==
- Economy of Burkina Faso
- Human rights in Burkina Faso
- Mining industry of Burkina Faso
