= St Martin's Chapel, Chisbury =

Coordinates: 51.3901°N 1.5986°W

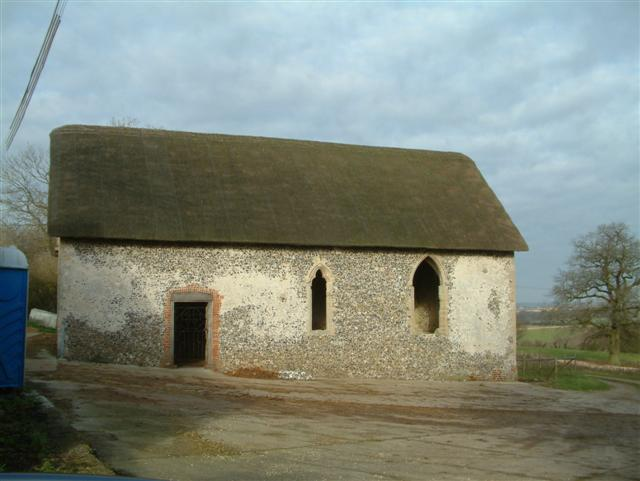
St Martin's Chapel, Chisbury

St Martin's Chapel, Chisbury is a mediaeval former chapel next to the manor house in the hamlet of Chisbury, in Little Bedwyn parish in the east of Wiltshire, England.

The chapel was built in the early part of the 13th century, on the edge of Chisbury Camp, an Iron Age hillfort. There are written records of it from 1246 onwards and its surviving architecture is contemporary with that period. The walls are faced with flint. The windows have the remains of good-quality Decorated Gothic tracery that suggests they were added in the latter part of the 13th century. By 1496, the chapel was dedicated to St Martin.

Because Chisbury manor was linked to Froxfield church, the rector of Froxfield received the tithes from Chisbury; sometime before 1246 he assigned this income to St Denys Priory, Southampton. However, Chisbury was within Great Bedwyn parish, and from 1247 the chapel was treated as dependent on St Mary's church at Great Bedwyn, although the priory continued to receive the tithes and appoint chaplains. Between 1496 and 1518 St. Martin's lacked a priest, but it was served again from then until 1547. Thereafter, the building lapsed from use for worship and was re-used as a barn. It was re-roofed with thatch in the 19th century.

The hillfort, including the chapel, was designated as a scheduled ancient monument in 1925. The chapel is in the guardianship of English Heritage.
