= Quelch =

Quelch is an English surname, with alternative spellings of Quelche, or Qulch
It derived from the Old English nickname for a Celt or foreigner "woelisc", via Middle English "walsche", to Welch, Welsh or Wels(c)he. Notable people with the surname include:

- Harry Quelch (1858–1913), one of the first Marxists in Britain
- John Quelch (academic) (born 1951), British-American academic
- John Quelch (pirate) (1666–1704), English pirate
- Lorenzo Quelch (1862–1937), British trade unionist and politician, younger brother of Harry
- Tom Quelch (1886–1954), socialist politician and son of Harry
- Victor Quelch (1891–1975), Canadian farmer, soldier and politician
