= Little Bedwyn =

Village in Wiltshire, England

Coordinates: 51.391°N 1.582°W

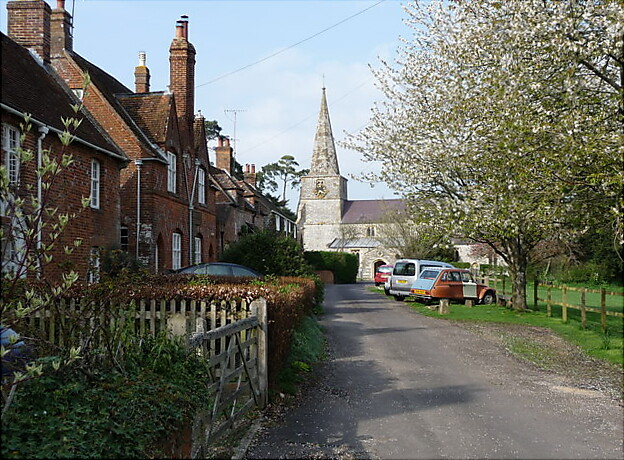
- Church Street, Little Bedwyn

- Location within Wiltshire
- Population: 250 (in 2011)
- OS grid reference: SU292659
- Civil parish: Little Bedwyn
- Unitary authority: Wiltshire
- Ceremonial county: Wiltshire
- Region: South West
- Country: England
- Sovereign state: United Kingdom
- Post town: Marlborough
- Postcode district: SN8
- Dialling code: 01672
- Police: Wiltshire
- Fire: Dorset and Wiltshire
- Ambulance: South Western
- UK Parliament: East Wiltshire
- Website: Parish Council

Little Bedwyn (also spelt Little Bedwin, and sometimes called Bedwyn Parva) is a village and civil parish on the River Dun in Wiltshire, England, about 3 miles (4.8 km) south-west of the market town of Hungerford in neighbouring Berkshire. The parish includes the hamlet of Chisbury.

The Kennet and Avon Canal and the Reading to Taunton railway line follow the Dun and pass through the village. Little Bedwyn is served by Bedwyn railway station, which is about 1 mile (1.6 km) south-west of the village at Great Bedwyn.

== History ==
About 0.62 miles (1 km) west of Little Bedwyn is Chisbury Camp, an Iron Age hillfort consisting of earthworks which enclose some 14 acres (5.7 ha). Within the camp is the former St Martin's chapel, a Decorated Gothic building of flint, now a farm building. Bedwyn Dyke, an early medieval fortification with similarities to the Wansdyke, stretches some 2.8 km southeast from the hillfort.

Most of Little Bedwyn was part of a larger estate called Bedwyn, which in the early Middle Ages was held by the kings of Wessex and of England. Tenants of the king included (from c.1211) John Russell; a member of the family seated at Kingston Russell, Dorset, he was a household knight of King John. His descendants included William Russell (1257–1311), administrator and defender of the Isle of Wight, elected to parliament for one session to represent Great Bedwyn. The Victoria County History traces later owners.

Anciently the whole parish was within Savernake Forest, but after a redrawing of the forest's boundaries in 1330 only the western part remained in it.

The National Gazetteer of Great Britain and Ireland of 1868 says of Little Bedwyn:

BEDWIN, (or Bedwyn, Little), a parish and village in the hundred of Kinwardstone, in the county of Wilts, 1 mile to the N.E. of Great Bedwyn. It was anciently a part of Great Bedwyn; but was made a separate parish at the beginning of the 15th century. It is situated on the Kennet and Avon canal, and includes the hamlets of Chisbury and Timbridge. The living is a vicarage in the diocese of Salisbury, of the value of £280, in the patronage of the prebendary. The church, an ancient edifice, partly in the Norman style, is dedicated to St. Michael. Chisbury Camp is in this parish. Within the entrenchment are the remains of an old chapel, now converted into a barn. The Wansdyke passes through Little Bedwyn.

In the mid 19th century there was some uncertainty as to whether the parish included about 150 acres (61 ha) of Savernake Forest lying at the parish's western end, but by the 1880s it had been decided that the land was part of the parish. From then until 1987 the total size of the parish was 4,343 acres (1,758 ha). In 1987, an area of 120 acres (49 ha) was transferred to Great Bedwyn.

The population of the parish has fluctuated in recent centuries. Between 1801 and 1871 it rose from 428 to 579, but since then it has fallen gradually and in 2001 stood at 280.

Surrealist singer and poet Ivor Cutler made reference to the village on his final recorded album, 1998's A Flat Man, via the track "Empty Road at Little Bedwyn".

== Parish church ==
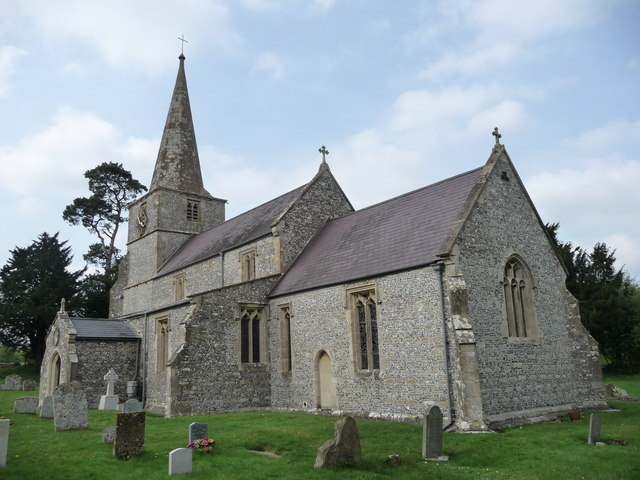
St Michael's Church

The Church of England parish church of St. Michael at Little Bedwyn is at the north end of the village, on the bank of the River Dun. It was built in the 12th or 13th century, although the tall and narrow nave has the proportions of an earlier Anglo-Saxon church. The oldest parts are the three-bay north and south arcades, from the late 12th century and early 13th respectively, although their carved details were restored in the 19th century.

All the windows are from the 15th century, as is the south porch; around that time the west tower was rebuilt and the spire added. The architect C. E. Ponting wrote in 1895 that the aisles and chancel were also rebuilt from the ground up in the mid-15th century. The church is built of flint rubble with Bath stone dressings; the spire is entirely Bath stone. The roof of the north aisle is from c.1500, while the roofs of the chancel and nave were replaced in 1841.

Extensive restoration was carried out by T.H. Wyatt in 1868. The work included the building of the north vestry, and new furnishings. The round window over the south door is also 19th-century. Fragments of medieval glass were fitted into the north window of the chancel; Pevsner dismisses the east window of 1869 as "terrible".

The spire was dismantled and rebuilt in 1963 after being struck by lightning. The church was designated as Grade I listed in 1966. The listing states that the octagonal limestone font is 19th-century but Orbach places it in the 14th.

The four bells in the tower were augmented by a fifth in 2014. The oldest two are from the 17th century.

=== Prebend and parish ===
In the Middle Ages, the church at Little Bedwyn was a chapel of the parish church at Great Bedwyn, and the rector of Great Bedwyn had prebendal rights over Little Bedwyn. The church had its own graveyard, and from 1554, when a vicar was appointed, it had the status of a parish church. From around this time, its area extended to Chisbury. After St Katharine's church was built for the Tottenham House estate, the parish created for it in 1864 took the western third of Little Bedwyn parish.

Today the parish, alongside eleven others, is within the area of the Savernake team ministry.

St. Michael's parish registers are in the Wiltshire and Swindon History Centre and cover the years 1722–1857 (baptisms), 1722–1959 (marriages), and 1722–1919 (burials).

== Notable people ==
Henry Randall, Archdeacon of Bristol, was born at Little Bedwyn in 1808.

Sir Felix Pole, who worked his way up to be general manager of the Great Western Railway in the 1920s, was born at Little Bedwyn and is buried there. Lorenzo Quelch, trade unionist and Reading councillor, was born at Little Bedwyn in 1862. The Spanish-born philanthropist Delfina Entrecanales bought a farm with cottages at Little Bedwyn in the 1970s, and set up a recording studio there.

== See also ==
- Little Bedwyn Lock
- St Martin's Chapel, Chisbury
