= George Potter Neele =

George Potter Neele (12 December 1825 – 4 January 1921), generally referred to as G. P. Neele, was an English railways executive, known for revolutionising the programming of railway timetables on scientific principles.

== History ==
Neele was born in Kentish Town, and moved with his parents to Walsall in 1838.

Entered the service of the Eastern Counties Railway at Bishopsgate railway station. He transferred to Norwich when the Eastern Counties Railway acquired the Norfolk Railway. In 1847 he was appointed Superintendent of the South Staffordshire Railway and moved to Walsall until that company was taken over by the London and North Western Railway in 1861. He became the Company’s District Superintendent at Birmingham. In 1862 he was Outdoor Superintendent at Euston, a new position which developed into that of General Superintendent of the Line, a position which he held for 33 years until he retired in 1895. reaching the rank of Line Superintendent.

As Superintendent of the Line, he had the responsible duty of taking personal charge of the trains by which Queen Victoria travelled, and no less than 112 of these journeys were accompanied by him - principally to and from Scotland. For these services he received no only personal thanks but two or three valuable souvenirs from the Queen. He was elected Chairman of the Railway Clearing House Superintendents Conference in 1868 and again in 1884, and was a leading member of that body.

In 1910 he was elected the first President of the Retired Railway Officers' Society.

== Publications ==
Neele, G. P. (1904) Railway Reminiscences
