= Cissa (West Saxon) =

Viceroy of the King of Wessex

Cissa was reported as the viceroy of king Centwine of Wessex (reigned c. 676–686). Cissa is sometimes said to have himself been a king of Wessex, but does not feature in the king lists or genealogies. He is said to have constructed Chisbury Camp, and to have founded Abingdon Abbey.
