= James Milne (railway manager) =

Sir James Milne
- Born: James Milne; 4 May 1883
- Died: 1 April 1958 (aged 74)
- Education: Victoria University of Manchester
- Occupation: General Manager
- Years active: 1904–1947
- Employer: Great Western Railway
- Predecessor: Sir Felix Pole
- Spouse(s): Nora Rebekah Milne (née Morse, 1888–1984)
- Awards: CSI, KCVO

Sir James Milne, K.C.V.O., C.S.I. (4 May 1883 – 1 April 1958), was an Irish railway manager in Great Britain. He was General Manager of the Great Western Railway (GWR) from 1929 to 1947, and also deputy chairman of the Railway Executive Committee (REC) from 1938 to 1947.

== Early life ==
Milne was born in Dublin, Ireland, in 1883. He attended Campbell College in Belfast and later moved to Great Britain to study Engineering at the Victoria University of Manchester, graduating in 1904.

== GWR ==
Milne joined the GWR 1904 as a pupil engineer (training to be a locomotive engineer) in the locomotive department. He later moved to Paddington and gained operational and traffic experience. In 1912 Milne married Nora Rebekah Morse, daughter of Levi Lapper Morse.

== Government work ==
Milne joined the Ministry of Transport when it was set up in 1919 as Director of Statistics until 1921. He also served on the Geddes Committee on National Expenditure (1921–22) and the India Retrenchment Committee (1922–23), which was chaired by Lord Inchcape. Milne was appointed Companion of the Order of the Star of India (CSI) in 1923.

== Return to GWR ==
Milne returned to the GWR as assistant general manager (to Sir Felix Pole) in 1922, and replaced Pole as General Manager in 1929. He continued Pole's work on the GWR's advertising and corporate image, introducing the Gill Sans typeface in advertising and the GWR monogram on advertising and rolling stock. He was knighted in 1932, and appointed Knight Commander of the Royal Victorian Order (KCVO) in 1936.

During his tenure he helped set up Railway Air Services, a joint venture between the major British railway companies and Imperial Airways. The GWR also investigated electrification but thought it not suitable or economic for its network.

From 1938 Milne continued as General Manager but was also deputy chairman of the Railway Executive Committee (REC), a government body responsible for running British railways during the Second World War. Milne was also a member of the Road Transport (Defence) Advisory Committee (1938). The REC's work continued after the end of the war through to nationalisation in 1948. In 1940 Milne was elected as a GWR director but could not take up the role as the REC was a government body.

On 29 July 1944 Paddington station had to be closed because of large crowds trying to leave London for the August Bank holiday and to escape flying bombs. The GWR had locomotives and coaches available, but were not allowed to run extra trains because of wartime restrictions. Milne had to threaten to involve the Prime Minister, Winston Churchill, before the Ministry of War Transport relented and allowed the extra trains to run.

== Retirement ==
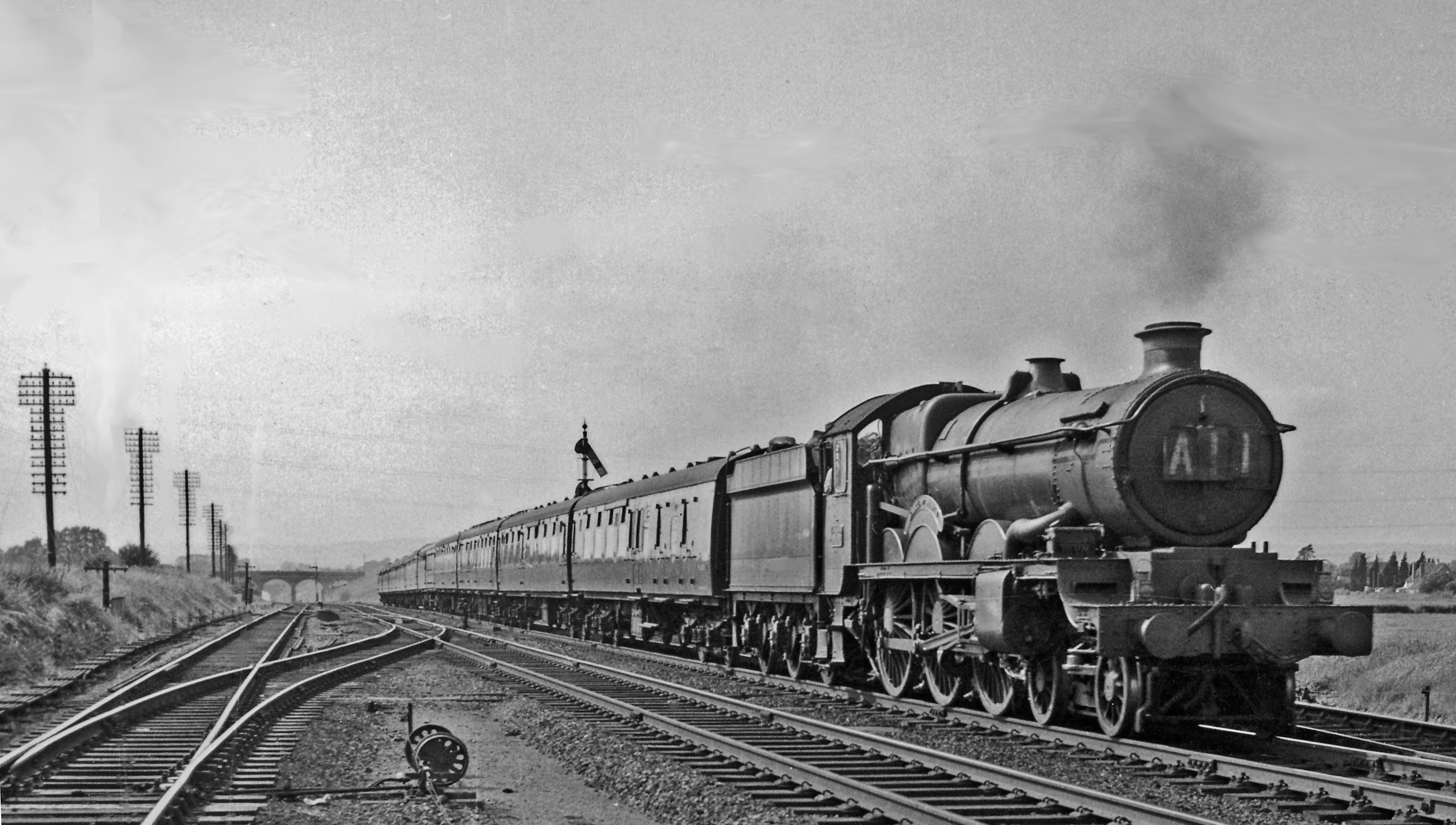
GWR Castle No. 7001 Sir James Milne surmounting the climb out of the Severn Tunnel

Milne strongly opposed state ownership of the railways, but was still offered the chairmanship of the Railway Executive of the British Transport Commission (BTC), which was being formed to manage the proposed nationalised British Railways. Milne declined the offer and retired from the GWR at the end of 1947.

In 1948 an ex-GWR locomotive, Castle class No. 7001 Denbigh Castle, was renamed as No. 7001 Sir James Milne. Milne died in 1958.

== Sources ==
- Dickinson, Geoff (2013). "Levi Lapper Morse J.P." My Primitive Methodist Ancestors.
- "No. 32830". The London Gazette (Supplement). 1 June 1923. p. 3945.
- "No. 33785". The London Gazette (Supplement). 29 December 1931. p. 2.
- "No. 15241". The Edinburgh Gazette. 7 January 1936. p. 19.
- Maggs, Colin (2013). A History of the Great Western Railway (1 ed.). Stroud, Gloucestershire, UK: Amberley Publishing. ISBN 978-1-4456-1277-5. OCLC 855536026.
- Nock, O.S. (1972). The Great Western Railway in the 20th Century (2 ed.). London: Ian Allan. ISBN 9780711002272. OCLC 251662074.
- Semmens, Peter (1985). A History of the Great Western Railway: 3. Wartime and the Final Years 1939-48. @Steam past (1 ed.). London: Guild Publishing. ISBN 978-0-043-85106-7. OCLC 786175335.
- University of Manchester (1908). The Victoria University of Manchester: Register of Graduates Up to July 1st, 1908 (3 ed.). Manchester: University Press.
- "Road Transport in an Emergency". The Glasgow Herald. 6 October 1938.
- "Milne, Sir James". Who's Who & Who Was Who. Vol. 1920–2015 (April 2014 online ed.). A & C Black. (Subscription or UK public library membership required.)

Business positions
| Preceded by Felix Pole | General Manager of the Great Western Railway; 1929–1947 | Company nationalised as part of British Railways |
