= Raymond Carpmael =

Raymond Carpmael (1875–1950) was chief engineer of the Great Western Railway from 1929 to 1939.

== Life ==
He was born on 14 September 1875 in Brockley, Kent, the son of Deanston Carpmael (1843–1934) and Mary Ann Iliffe (1842–1932).

He was educated at the Bromley School of Science and Art.

He married Frances Elsie Ford (1875–1931), eldest daughter of Sir Francis Colville Ford, 4th Baronet and Lady Ford, of Grosvenor House, Bath, on 10 September 1900 in St Saviour's Church, Bath.

He was made an Officer of the Military Division of the Order of the British Empire in the birthday honours in 1935.

In retirement he was appointed a Justice of the Peace in Reading in April 1941.

He died on 8 March 1950 at his home, 26 Redlands Road, Reading and left an estate of £29,020 (equivalent to £859,000 in 2025).

== Career ==
His engineering career started in 1894 as an employee of Stothert and Pitt, Ltd, crane makers of Bath. He entered the service of the Great Western Railway as a Temporary Surveyor and Draughtsman in March 1900. He was Assistant in charge of various large new work schemes from 1901 to 1908. He was appointed Assistant Engineer for the Shrewsbury Region in 1909 and Assistant Engineer for the Gloucester Division in 1916.

During 1917 he was in charge of the No. 3 (Civilian) G.W.R. Company engaged in laying and maintaining railways in France and Flanders. He held the rank of colonel in the Engineer and Staff Railway Corps, Royal Engineers.

In 1919 he was promoted to divisional engineer in Shrewsbury, moving in the same role to Neath in 1922. In 1924 he was assistant to the joint Chief Engineers at Barry, before moving in 1926 to become the assistant to the chief engineer at Paddington in 1926. He succeeded John Christian Lloyd as chief engineer in 1929.

He published a paper “Speed and Safety on the Railways” which gained him the gold medal from the Institute of Transport in 1928.

He retired on 31 December 1939. During 1941 and 1942 he was recalled to the Great Western Railway as acting chief engineer due to the secondment of his successor as director-general of Aircraft Production Factories.

Professional and academic associations
Preceded by John Christian Lloyd	Chief Engineer of the Great Western Railway; 1929–1939	Succeeded by Allan Quartermaine
