= Cissa, Burkina Faso =

Cissa
- Country: Burkina Faso
- Region: Est Region
- Province: Gnagna Province
- Department: Bilanga Department

Population (2019)
  - Total: 1,416

Cissa is a village in the Bilanga Department of Gnagna Province in eastern Burkina Faso.

Population
Year	Pop.	±%
1985	526	—
2006	1,023	+94.5%
2019	1,416	+38.4%
