= Felix Pole =

British railway manager and industrialist

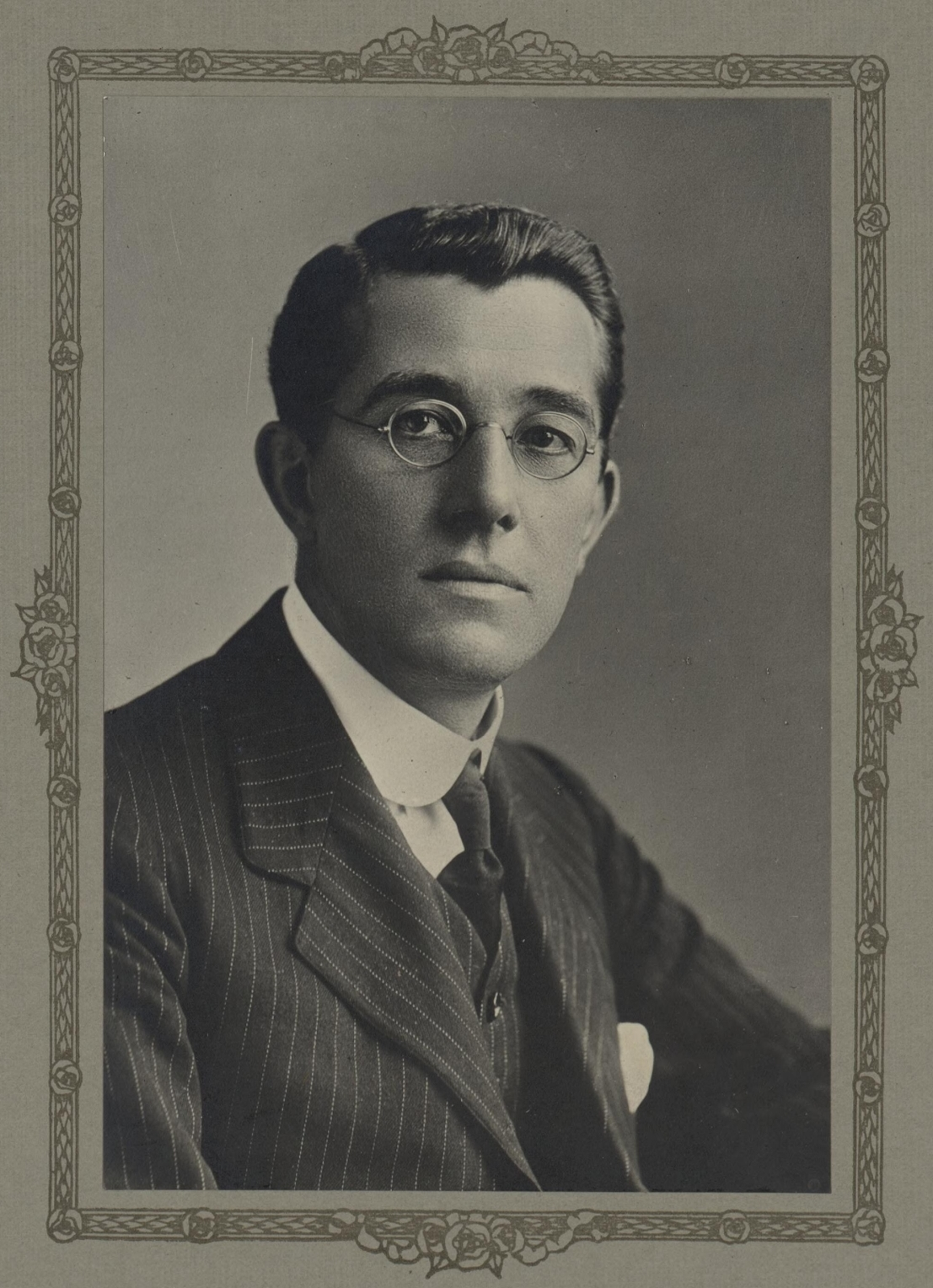
- Portrait of Pole c.1912, from the National Library of Wales
- Born: Felix John Clewett Pole; February 1, 1877; Little Bedwyn, Wiltshire, United Kingdom of Great Britain and Ireland
- Died: January 15, 1956 (aged 78); Reading, Berkshire, United Kingdom

Sir Felix John Clewett Pole (1 February 1877 – 15 January 1956) was a British railway manager and industrialist. He was general manager of the Great Western Railway from 1921 to 1929, before becoming executive chairman of Associated Electrical Industries, a post he held until 1945.

== Biography ==
=== Early life ===
Born in Little Bedwyn in Wiltshire, Pole joined the Great Western Railway as a telegraph lad at Swindon, aged 14, in 1891.

=== Career ===
He was rapidly promoted and in 1904 was working in General Manager James Charles Inglis's department in the headquarters at Paddington station, working on the railway's marketing campaigns. In 1912 he became head of the Staff and Labour Department, rising to Assistant General Manager in 1919 and finally General Manager in 1921. At the invitation of their national governments, he inspected both Sudanese and Egyptian railways in the 1920s and 1930s respectively.

Pole was knighted in 1924 and left the Great Western Railway in 1929 to become Executive Chairman of AEI. By 1945 Pole was reported to be completely blind, and was thought too old to lead the company into the post-war electronics boom, and was succeeded by Captain Oliver Lyttelton.

In April 1954 a GWR 4073 Class locomotive, 5066, was renamed Sir Felix Pole in his honour. In March 2015 a change ringing method was named after him; Sir Felix Pole Surprise Major, rung for the first time at Huntsham, Devon

=== Death ===
Pole died at Reading in 1956 and is buried in Little Bedwyn.
