= Keith Grand =

- Born: 3 July 1900; Mossley Hill, Liverpool, England
- Died: 1983 (aged 82–83); Sodbury, Gloucestershire, England
- Occupation: Railway Manager

Keith Walter C. Grand (1900–1983) was Assistant General Manager of Great Western Railway and later General Manager and Chief Regional Officer of British Railways Western Region. He was also a member of the British Transport Commission,

Grand was born in 1900 in the Mossley Hill district of Liverpool the son of Canadian-born Douglas and Emma Grand. He joined the Great Western Railway in 1919 after he left the Rugby School.
