= Aviastroitel =

Glider Air Craft Ltd
- Industry: Aerospace
- Founder: Vladimir Egorovich Fedorov
- Headquarters: Moscow, Russia
- Key people: President: Denis D. Lavrov
- Products: Gliders and motor gliders
- Website: www.glider.ru

Aviastroitel Ltd. (Russian: ООО "Авиастроитель", in English literally Aircraft Manufacturers) is a manufacturer of sailplanes that was originally based in Penza, Russia. Since 2010, the company has been known as Glider Air Craft Ltd (Russian: ООО "ГЛАЙДЕР ЭЙРКРАФТ") and has been based in Moscow.

== History ==
The company history is rooted back to Vladimir Egorovich Fedorov's first fibreglass motor glider, the Fedorov Istra. Fedorov was born in 1937 and graduated from the Moscow Aviation Institute with a PhD in aerodynamics. He later went on to work on the Buran program. The Istra was designed in 1970 and completed in 1974 as part of his sport flying with the Second Moscow Aeroclub and he and club members experimented with it for ten years.

Fedorov's next design was the Baikal, another fibreglass motorglider first flown in 1986. It flew about 30 test flights that year but the engine installation proved problematic and the aircraft was retired.

In 1989, he began work on the "Dream" glider. This was a very small and lightweight design and developed as the Mechta I, Mechta II and Russia I and II prototypes. The 12.6 m (41.3 ft) wing span Russia II was entered in the FAI World Class competition, announced in 1989 to pick a small, inexpensive and easy to fly glider with at least a 30:1 glide ratio for this new one-Design competition class. To support the bid, a group known as the Aircraft Cooperative Mechta was formed and three hand-made prototypes were built ('Mechta means 'dream' in Russian). The aircraft was well received at the 1993 competition and fly-off held in Oerlinghausen, Germany, but the lack of a manufacturing facility behind the design, plus political pressures meant that the "Dream" glider was awarded second place behind the winning Polish Politechnika Warszawska PW-5.

Aviastroitel logo in 2006

Disappointed with the outcome of the competition, the Mechta group found consolation in the enthusiasm of Americans who attended with their Roberts Cygnet design. They had great interest in the simple Russian glider and indicated that the North American market was right for such an aircraft for solo training and Club class flying. Known as the "Russia glider' and later simply as the "Russia", production was begun under the designation Aviastroitel AC-4 Russia. One of the three prototypes was purchased at the competition and imported into the US as a Fedorov Russia and demand quickly appeared. A US distributor, Russia 12.6 was set up to demonstrate the aircraft and sign up dealers. The Russian cooperative was reformed into a production company, taking the name Aircraft Builders, or Aviastroitel in Russian. It was under the Aviastroitel banner that most of the aircraft came to North America and became well known.

In 1994, US distribution was transferred to Mechta Sailplanes, LLC, which imported 18 Russia gliders into the US. In response Aviastroitel created a second set of molds and started a second assembly line in Penza, giving a total production capacity of 48 AC-4s per year.

In 1997 William Ayd became US distributor under the name Russia Sailplanes, Inc. to market the expanding line of Aviastroitel gliders and motor gliders and the two companies enjoyed a successful partnership.

Aviastroitel continued production of AC-4 Russias and developed the AC-5M motor glider from the AC-4 and the new AC-6 FAI 15 Metre Class glider. By 2002 the company had produced over 100 gliders, most of them being shipped to the US, with smaller numbers sold in Canada, Greece, Holland and New Zealand and the United Kingdom. The company even developed their AC-5M motor glider into the AC-5MP unmanned aerial vehicle.

Then, in 2002 the Russian government adopted new standards for industrial production. The company could comply, but it made production non-profitable. The company ceased production and concentrated on a new two-seat touring motor glider model, the AC-7M, moving future manufacturing off shore. Due to the problems with the new standards the relationship between the US-based Russia Sailplanes and Aviastroitel was ended.

Work on the AC-7M started in 2002 and it first flew in 2005. Development of this model continued through 2009. In 2010 the company was reorganised as Glider Air Craft Ltd and the AC-4, 5, 6, 7 and 7M were returned to production. Development of the AC-8 glider and motor glider was started in 2010.

== Aircraft ==
Summary of aircraft built by Aviastroitel and Glider Air Craft Ltd
| Model name | First flight | Number built | Type |
|---|---|---|---|
| AC-4 | 1993 | 60 | Glider and motor glider |
| AC-5M | 1999 | 35 | Motor glider |
| AC-6 | | | Glider |
| AC-7 | | | glider |
| AC-7M | 2006 | | motor glider |
| AC-8 | | under development (2010) | glider and motor glider |
