= AC7 =

AC7 or AC-7 may refer to:

- Aviastroitel AC-7, a Russian glider
- Aviastroitel AC-7M, a Russian motorglider
- Southern Pacific class AC-7, a class of steam locomotives
- USS Hector (AC-7), a U.S. Navy refueling ship
- AC-7, an IEC Utilization Category
- Ace Combat 7: Skies Unknown, a combat flight action video game
