= 6U =

6U or 6-U may refer to:

== Aviation ==
- Air Ukraine (IATA code:6U)
- PW-6U, a model of Politechnika Warszawska PW-6 glider
- HY-6U, a model of Xian H-6 jet bomber

== Other technologies ==
- 6U, a rack unit configuration of 10½-inch depth
- RG-6/U coaxial electrical cable
- 6U, a model of Zenit Soviet spy satellite

== See also ==
- U6 (disambiguation)
