= U6 =

U6 or U-6 may refer to:

- German submarine U-6, one of several German submarines
- U6, a railway line on several underground railway systems:
  - U6 U-Bahn line, a line on the Berlin U-Bahn
  - U6, a line on the Frankfurt U-Bahn
  - U6, a line on the Munich U-Bahn
  - U6, of the Vienna U-Bahn system.
- The IATA airline designator code for Ural Airlines
- British NVC community U6, Juncus squarrosus – Festuca ovina grassland, one of the calcifugous grassland communities of the British National Vegetation Classification
- Ultima VI, a computer role-playing game
- U6, a U.S. unemployment statistic - see Unemployment#United States Bureau of Labor statistics
- U6 promoter, a gene playing an important role in the synthesis of shRNA
- Haplogroup U6
- U6 spliceosomal RNA, a small nuclear RNA component of the spliceosome
- US military designation for the DHC-2 Beaver aircraft
- Miss Madison, an Unlimited Hydroplane boat that carries the American Power Boat Association entrant number U-6.
- Upper sixth (grade 13) in British secondary education

== See also ==
- 6U (disambiguation)
