= LM 24 =

Sailing boat

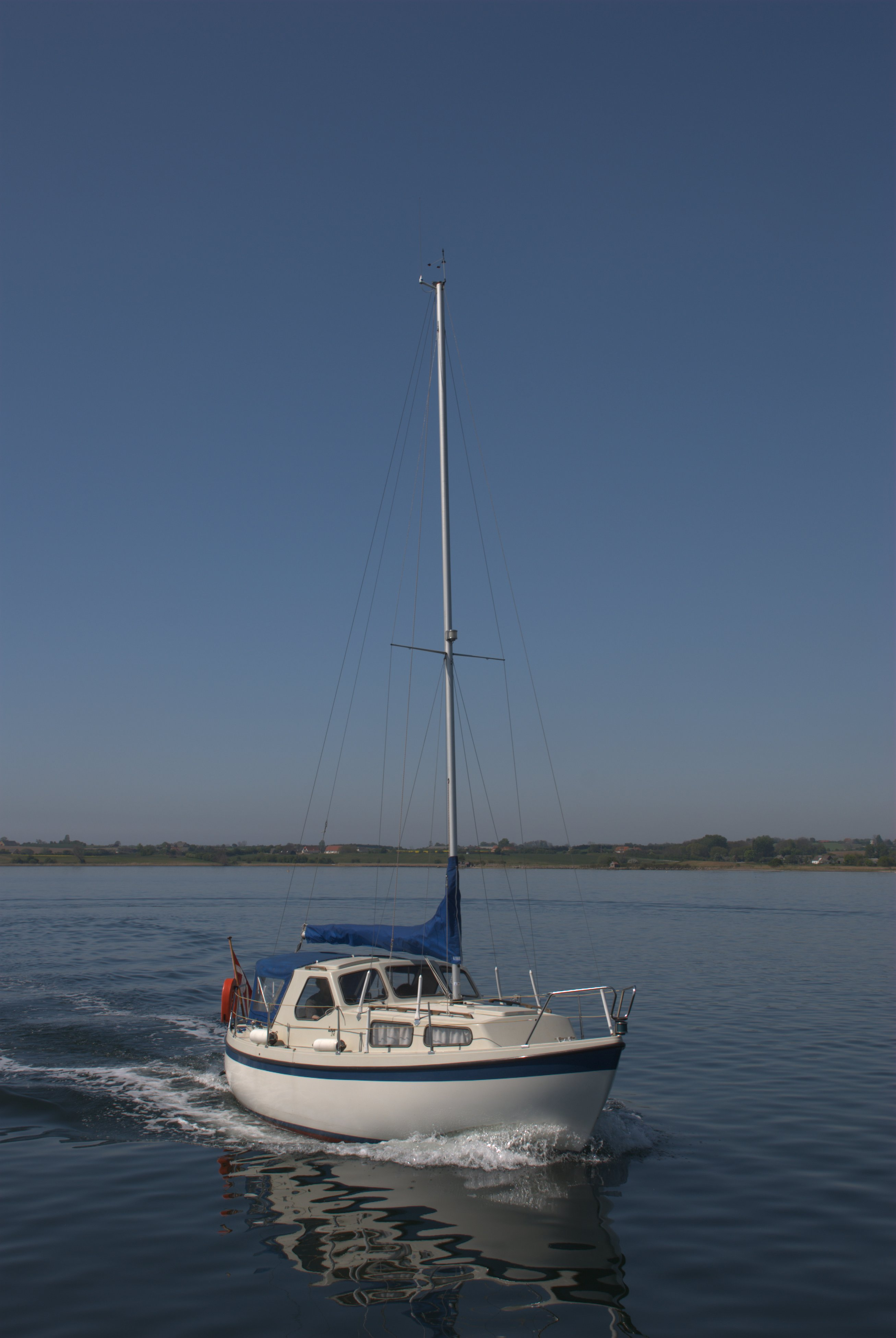
A LM 24 sailing by engine propulsion

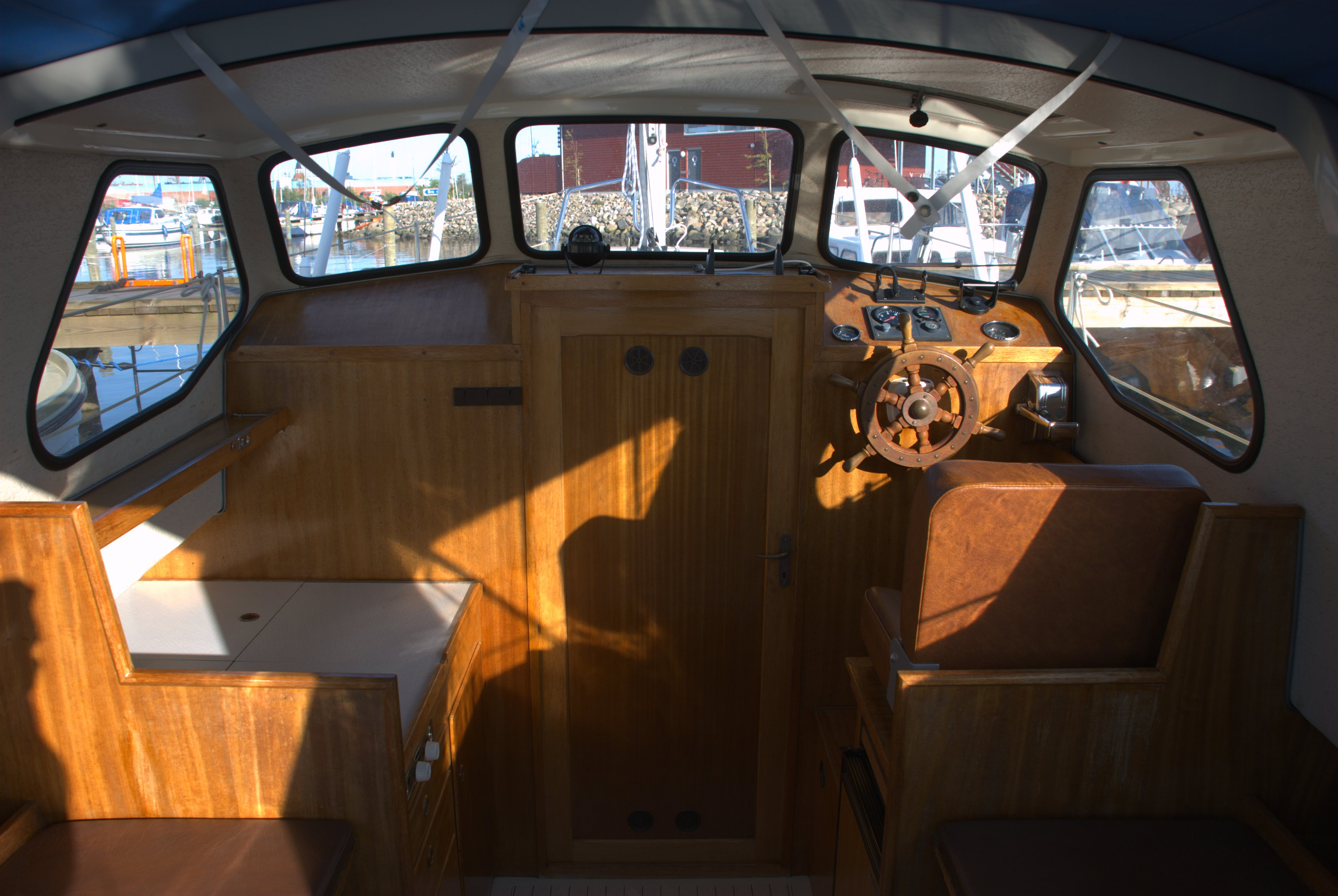
A LM 24's cockpit

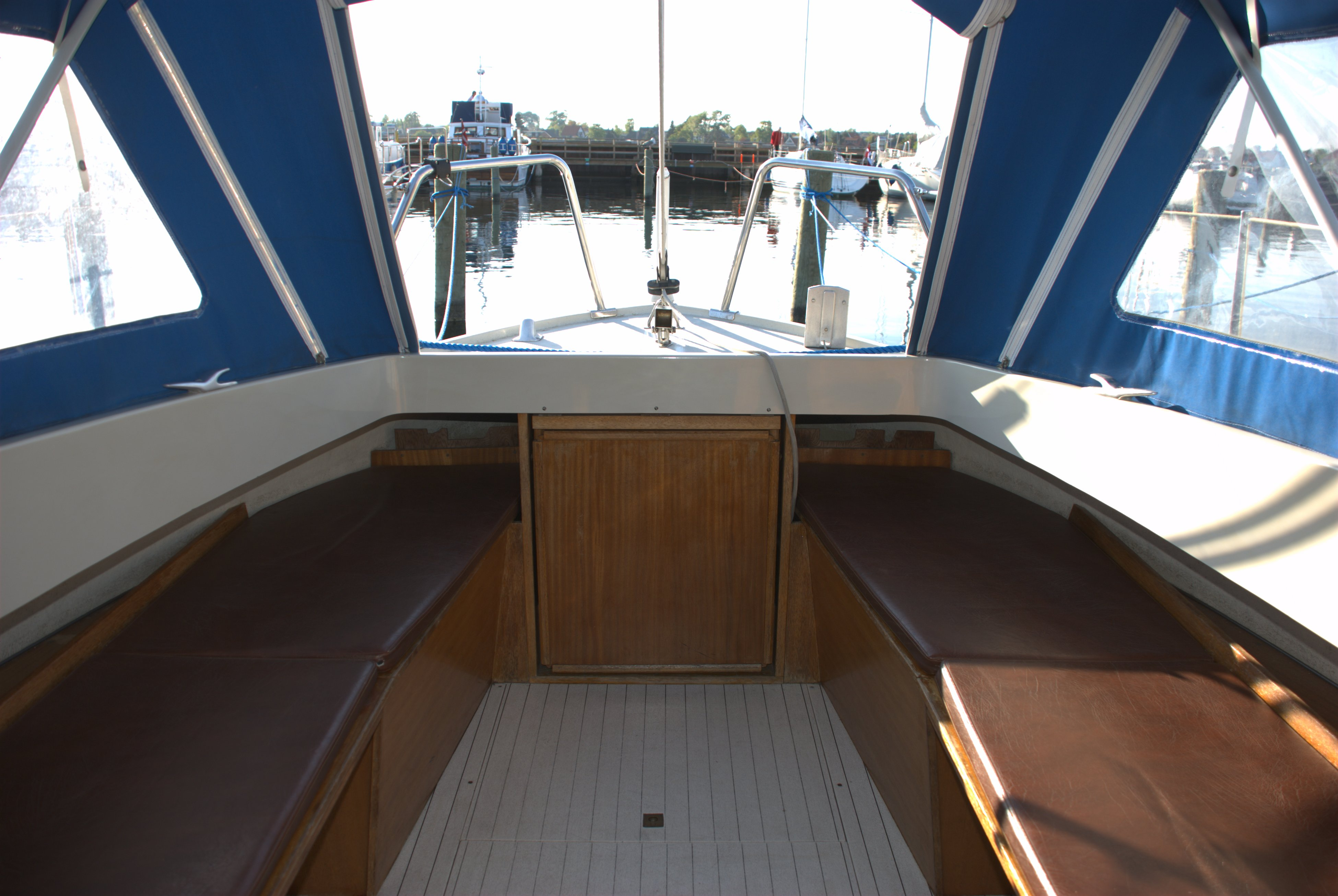
A LM 24's internal stern

LM 24 is a keelboat. It was designed in 1977 by the Danish company Lunderskov Møbelfabrik (LM) and later produced from 1972 to 1984.

A total of 659 were produced, of which some were factory-assembled.

The hull is made of white fiberglass and the keel as a long-keel containing 1 ton of iron.

The outer dimensions are 7.20m in length, 6.10m in length at the waterline, and 23.22m in sail area to displacement. The draft is 1.00m and internally the cabin is 1.72m in height.

As they can be used as motorboats, they are able to contain an internal engine and has a 7.85m tall main-mast attached with a 3.20m long boom.

Their LYS value is 0.86.
