= One-design racing =

Competition class in sailing, motor racing and gliding

One-design racing is a racing method which may be adopted in sports using complex equipment, whereby all vehicles have identical or very similar designs or models, avoiding the need for a handicap system.

== Motorsport ==
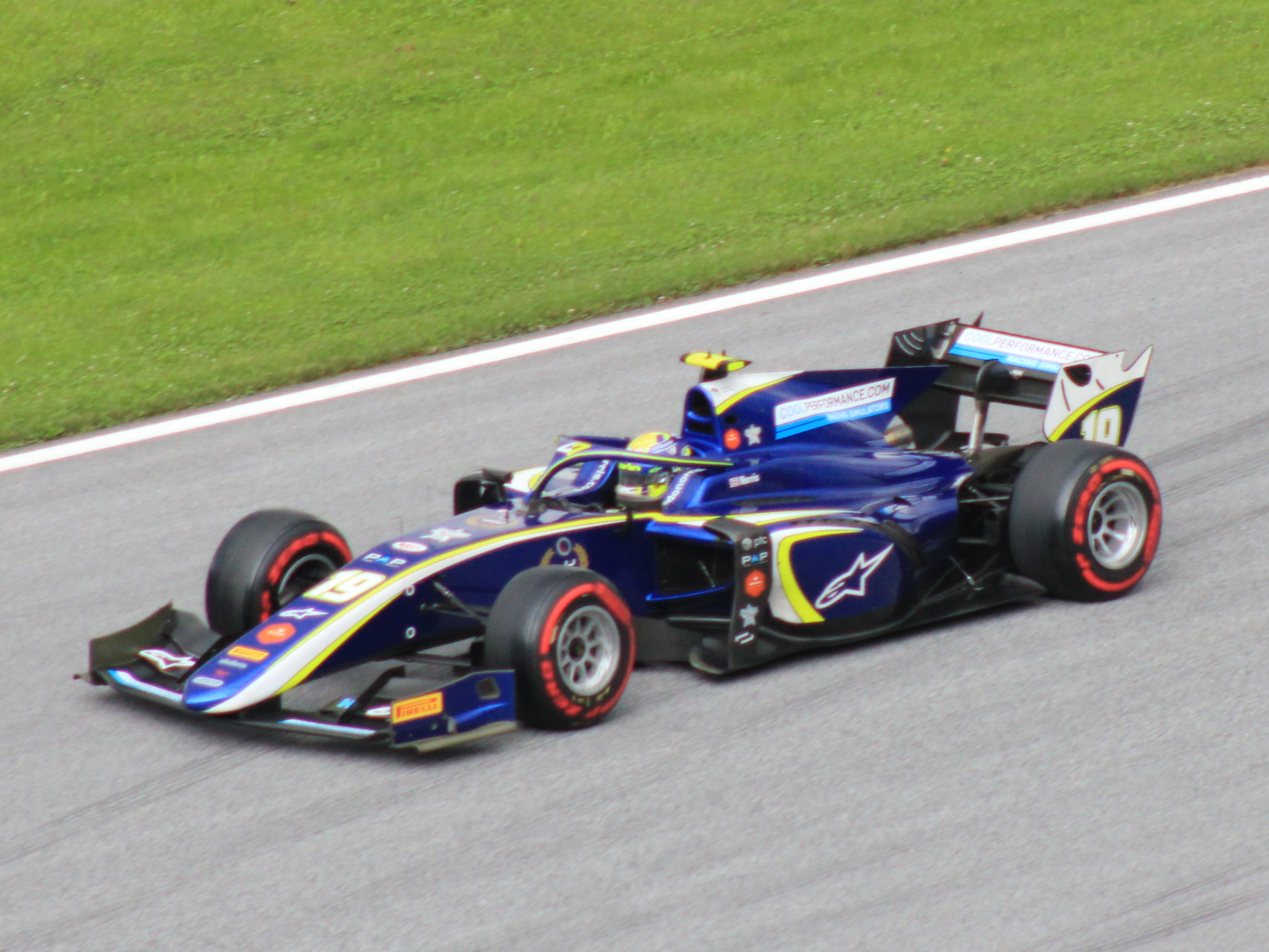
Dallara F2 2018 FIA Formula 2 Championship racer

One-make racing series (also known as spec racing series) are racing series in which all competitors race with identical or very similar vehicles from the same manufacturer and suppliers. Typically, this means the same type of chassis, powertrain, tyres, brakes, and fuel are used by all drivers.

The idea behind one-make car racing is that success will be based more on driver skill and car setup, instead of engineering skill and budget. One-make series are popular at an amateur level as they are affordable, due to the use of a common engine and chassis.

Examples of one-make racing series from around the world included the Dodge Viper Challenge, Ferrari Challenge, Porsche Carrera Cup and Supercup, Radical European Masters, Mini Challenge and Commodore Cup. There are also various formula categories that use one-make racing, such as Formula 2 (which since 2011 exclusively uses a car design by Dallara), Formula Renault, Formula Mazda, Formula Car Challenge, and the W Series.

The Formula One race series are not one-design nor one-make racing series as they allow participation by different manufacturers, each designing their own chassis and powertrain (within limits set by 'the formula'). Some spec parts are mandated, such as tyres and sensors. NASCAR is much in the same boat, with three distinct bodies (Chevrolet, Ford and Toyota) and four distinct engines (Hendrick, ECR, Roush Yates, TRD) available in competition.

Additionally, while IndyCar cars are all virtually identical Dallara DW12 models, the two distinct engine designs available from Chevrolet and Honda prevent IndyCar from being a "true" spec series.

The same applies to the Super Formula series. All teams compete in nearly identical Dallara SF23 models, but use engines supplied from Honda and Toyota, preventing it from being a true spec series.

While the term is less commonly used in motorcycle racing, there are a few series that meet this description, including the MotoE World Championship and other championships mainly for junior riders. The Oceania Junior Cup uses identical Yamaha YZF-R15 motorcycles for all competitors.

== Sailing ==
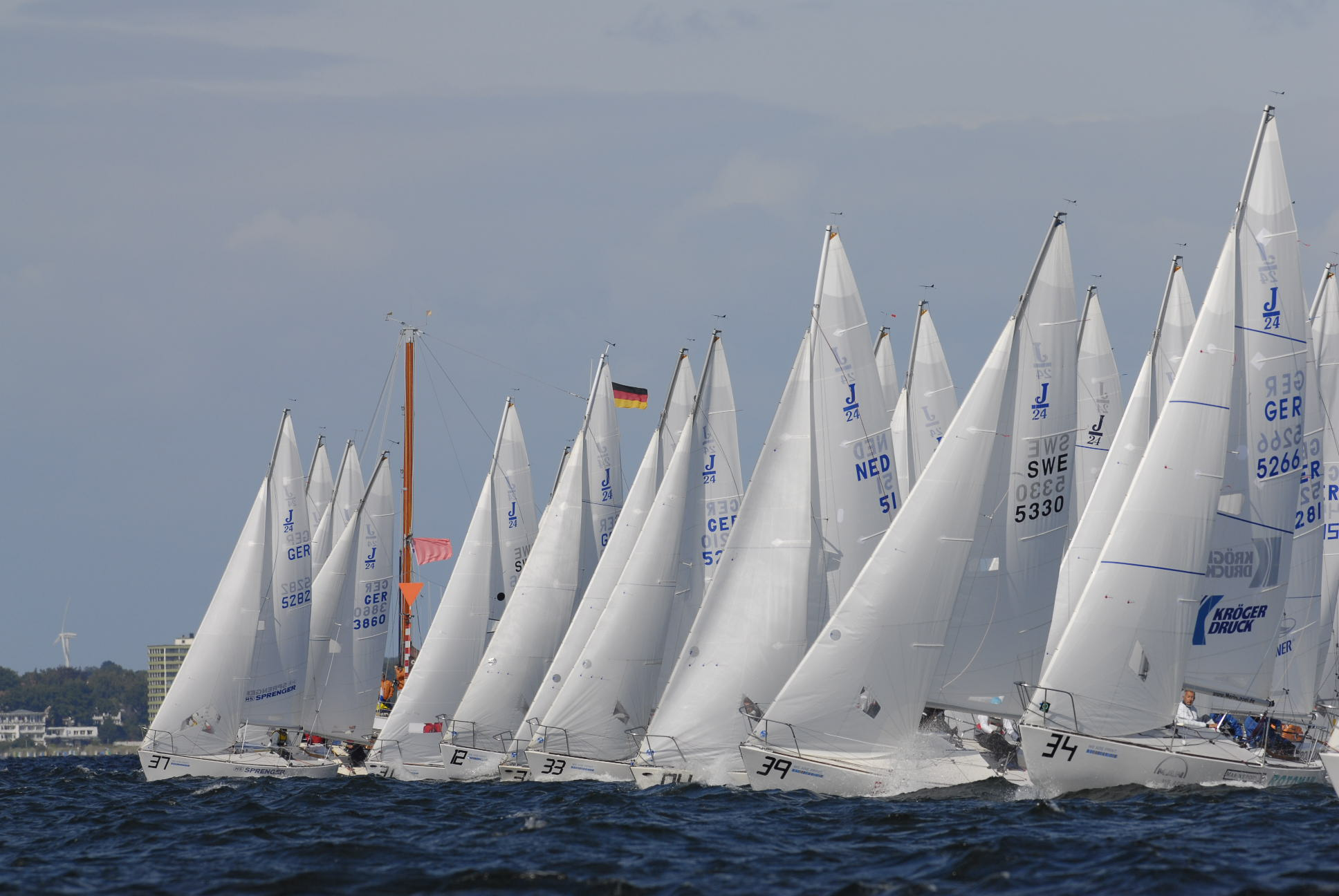
J/24 one-design sailboats racing

There are two primary methods of competition in sailboat racing: One-design and handicap racing (e.g. Portsmouth Yardstick, Performance Handicap Racing Fleet and Leading Yard Stick). One design refers to a racing class that consists of just one model or design of a sailboat. In one-design racing, the first boat to finish wins the race. This is contrasted with handicap racing, where time is added or subtracted from the finishing times based on design factors and mathematical formulas to determine the winner.

In between One-design and handicap racing, a number of other approaches exist. One-design classes can be contrasted with a development class, the classic example being America's Cup 12-metre class, or to the box rule used, for example, in the TP 52 class.

A further category, the formula based class setup, is sometimes confused with one design. The Mini Transat 6.50, the Volvo Open 70 monohull, the large ORMA trimaran, and the Formula 18 racing beach catamaran are the exponents of the formula approach. Class-legal boats race each other without any handicap calculations in both setups. However, under one design the boats are virtually identical except in details. At the same time, the formula setup allows the boats to differ much more in design while keeping a few important specifications the same. As a result, the identifier "One design" has been used more and more exclusively to denote a class that races only identical boats.

Having a rigid one-design specification keeps design experimentation to a minimum and reduces cost of ownership. The popularity of one-design increased in the 1970s with the introduction of laminate construction using fibre-reinforced plastic (FRP) and mold building technology. This process allowed the mass production of identical hulls of virtually any size at a lower price.

The one-design design idea was created by Thomas Middleton of the Shankill Corinthian Club located 10 miles (16 km) south of Dublin, Ireland in 1887. He proposed a class of double ended open dinghies of simple clincher construction in pine with a lifting boiler plate capable of being lifted. The boat was called The Water Wag. The idea was quickly adopted by sailors in Ireland, England, India and South America. The Water Wag Club still thrives in Dun Laoghaire, Co. Dublin.

The Solent One Design Class was one of the earliest one-design classes formed after discussions took place in 1893 and subsequent years. It quickly became popular, and was patronised by some of the most energetic and best known yacht owners in the Solent, Portsmouth and Southampton waters including Sir Philip Hunloke, the King's yachtmaster. Formed under the auspices of the Solent Sailing Club, the class was adopted by the Royal Yacht Squadron and the Island Sailing Club in 1895. The dimensions of the boats were length overall, 33 ft 3 in; Waterline length, 25 ft; Beam, 7 ft 9 in; Draft, 5 ft; Sail area, 750 sq ft.; Displacement, 5 tons with 2 tons 13 cwt. of lead in the keel. Cutter rig with 6 ft bowsprit. Designed by H. W. White, ten were built in 1895/6 by Messrs. White Brothers of Itchen Ferry, Southampton and another twelve were built in the following year. The class enjoyed ten years of keen racing but the Metre Rule, which was introduced in 1907 effectively killed the class. The only boat still afloat is Rosenn, formally Eilun, sail number 6. Now, fully restored, she has been identified as meriting inclusion in the National Register of Historic Vessels of the United Kingdom. She is kept in Lymington where she is still racing and winning on the Solent.

Conversely the Howth 17, designed just four years later by Sir Walter H. Boyd of Howth, Co. Dublin is still actively raced and is the oldest one-design racing keelboat still sailing as designed. While fifteen of the current fleet were built from 1898 to 1914, new boats can still be added, most recently in 2017.

As a general rule, the tolerances are strictest in smaller boats like dinghy classes and small keelboats. In some cases the tolerances are specified in a confidential Building Specification and often everything is designed and produced at the same factory or a very few factories. Examples are the Laser, Melges 24, and several small keelboats designed by Nathanael Greene Herreshoff, such as the 12½. In others the specification is published but the boats may only be produced by licensed manufacturers with usually only one builder in any country or region. Examples are the Olympic Finn and 470 but in both these classes a single manufacturer has succeeded in building faster boats than all other manufacturers.

However, in the Optimist dinghy, one of the world's largest classes, a tighter specification introduced in 1995/with ongoing scrutiny has resulted in boats from the 20+ approved builders on four continents being of identical speed, for example at the 2017 World Championship.

In medium- to large-sized boat classes, One design would refer to conformance to a standard specification, with the possibility of alterations being allowed as long as they remained within certain tolerances. Examples of this are the Dragon, J/24, Etchells, H-boat and the Farr 40. After the hull length overall (LOA) exceeds 27 feet (8.2 m), people generally refer to the boat as an offshore one-design boat or yacht.

In other classes, the one-design class may have organized around an existing fleet of similar boats that traditionally existed together often for commercial purposes such as sailing canoes, dhows, and skipjacks, or boats that developed a common hull form over the years (such as A-Scows).

In contrast to 'one-design', other sailboats race under a variety of handicapping rules and formulas developed to allow different type boats to compete against one another. Formula rules include the Square Metre Rule, the Ton class, the Universal Rule, and the Metre Rule. Handicap rules include Portsmouth Yardstick, PHRF, IOR, IMS, IRC, Americap and LYS.

== Soaring ==
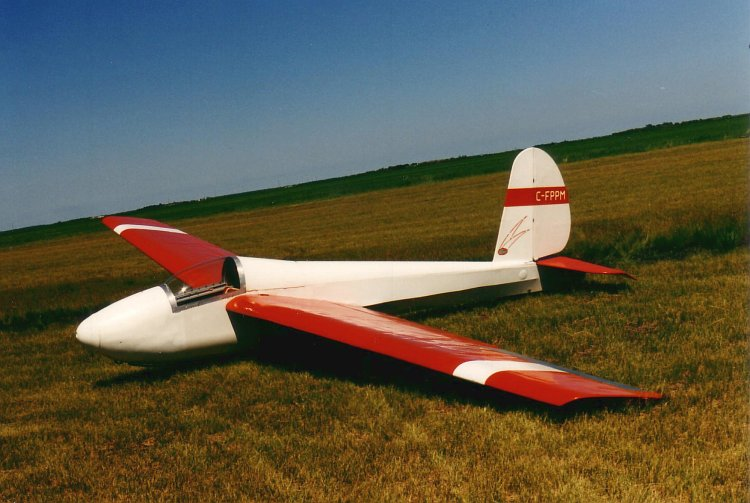
Schweizer SGS 1-26 one-design glider

There have been several attempts to bring the advantages of one-design to the sport of competitive glider racing. The most successful of these has been the Schweizer 1–26 class with 700 aircraft completed and flown between 1954 and 1981.

Schweizer Aircraft principal Paul A Schweizer was a proponent of the One-design concept. He intended the company's 1–26 to be the aircraft to establish a one-design class in the United States. He wrote:

"The true measure of pilot ability and experience is usually shown by his final standing in a contest. What could be more indicative of this when pilots are flying identical sailplanes with identical performance. One-design competition is the sure test of soaring skill."

Other one-design gliders have included those made in Russia by Aviastroitel, in Poland by Warsztaty Szybowcowe Orlik, and Germany, where for example the DFS Olympia Meise was planned for the 1940 Olympic championships.
