= Aviastroitel AC-4 Russia =

Russian glider

AC-4 Russia
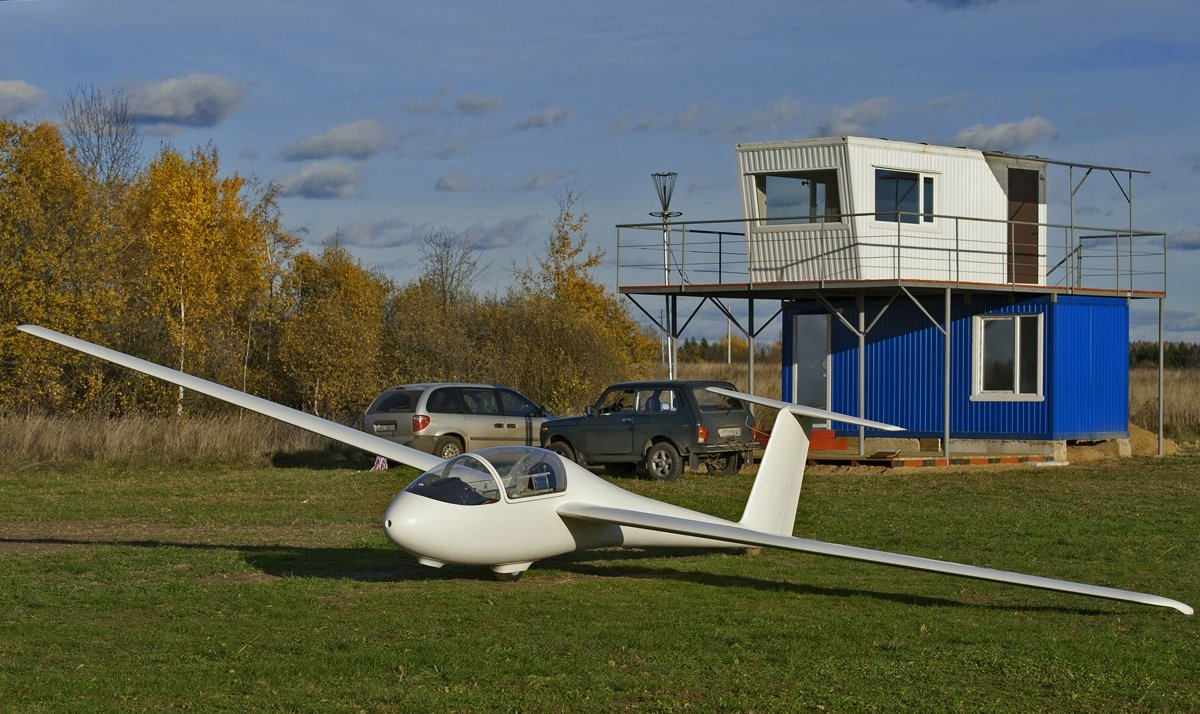

General information
- Type: Glider
- National origin: Russia
- Manufacturer: Aircraft Cooperative Mechta; Aviastroitel; Glider Air Craft
- Designer: Vladimir Egorovich Fedorov
- Status: In production
- Number built: 60

History
- Manufactured: 1993-2003 and 2010-present
- Introduction date: 1993
- Variant: Aviastroitel AC-5M

The Aviastroitel AC-4 Russia is a Russian mid-wing, single-seat glider designed by Vladimir Egorovich Fedorov and produced by Aircraft Cooperative Mechta, which became Aviastroitel, now Glider Air Craft.

The aircraft is sometimes referred to as the Federov AC-4 Russia, Mechta AC-4, Fedorov Me7 Mechta, Kenilworth Me7, AS+ Ltd AC-4 or Aircraft Cooperative Mechta AC-4 Russia. It is currently marketed as the Glider Air Craft Solo AC-4.

== Design and development ==
The aircraft started out in 1989 as Fedorov's "Dream" project for the OSTIV World Class Sailplane 1993 design contest. It went through several design prototypes, named Mechta I, Mechta II and Russia I and II. The Russia II was the version submitted to the competition. The bid involved forming a new concern, the Aircraft Cooperative Mechta and building three hand-made prototypes. The aircraft performed well in the competition and the fly-off held in Oerlinghausen, Germany, but only came in second place, behind the Polish Politechnika Warszawska PW-5.

The American team at the competition was very impressed with the Russian design, thought it would sell well for Club class and student solo flying and bought one of the three prototypes to take home with them. The aircraft proved popular and so a US distributorship under the name Russia 12.6 was set up to sell the Russian production. Since the Aircraft Cooperative Mechta could not mass-produce the aircraft they reformed as Aviastroitel. In 1994 US distribution was transferred to Mechta Sailplanes, LLC, which imported 18 Russia gliders. Aviastroitel created a second set of molds to respond to the demand and started a second assembly line with a total production capacity of 48 AC-4s per year. In 1997 William Ayd became US distributor under the name Russia Sailplanes, Inc. Production of the AC-4 was suspended in 2003 when the Russian government changed the requirements for industrial production, making building them uneconomical. In 2010 Aviastroitel became Glider Air Craft and production resumed.

The aircraft is made from fibreglass. Its 12.6 m (41.3 ft) span wing employs a Wortmann FX-60-157 airfoil. The AC-4 can be fitted with a McCulloch MC-101B two-stroke engine of 12 hp (9 kW) that will sustain flight. A Ballistic Recovery Systems parachute is optional.

Sixty Russias were completed, some as complete non-certified aircraft and some as kits for amateur construction.

== Operational history ==
In August 2011 there were 42 Russias registered in the United States, five in the United Kingdom and two in Canada.

== Variants ==
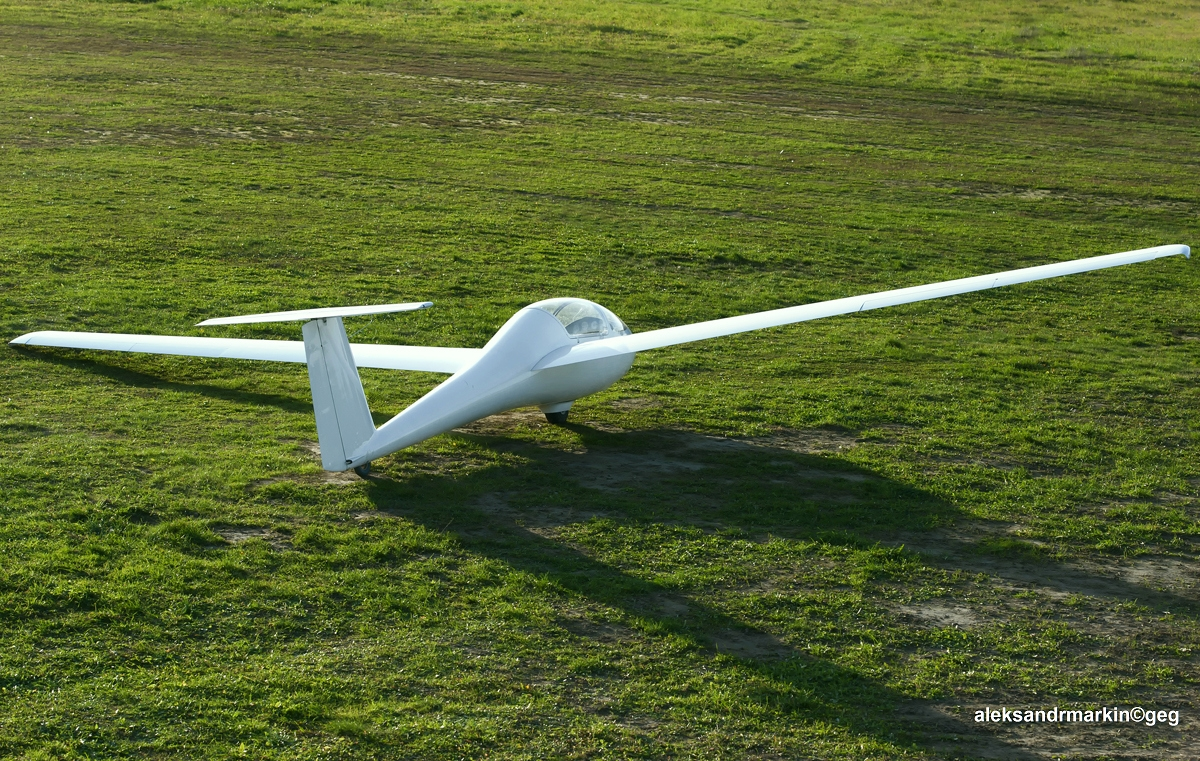
Aviastroitel AC-4 Russia

Mechta I
Initial 1989 prototype with 13.3 m (43.6 ft) wing span.
Mechta II
1991 prototype with 13.3 m (43.6 ft) wing span.
Russia I
1992 prototype with 11.0 m (36.1 ft) wing span.
Russia II
1992 prototype with 12.6 m (41.3 ft) wing span.
AC-4A Russia
First production model introduced in 1993, with a 12.6 m (41.3 ft) wing span and taildragger landing gear.
AC-4B Russia

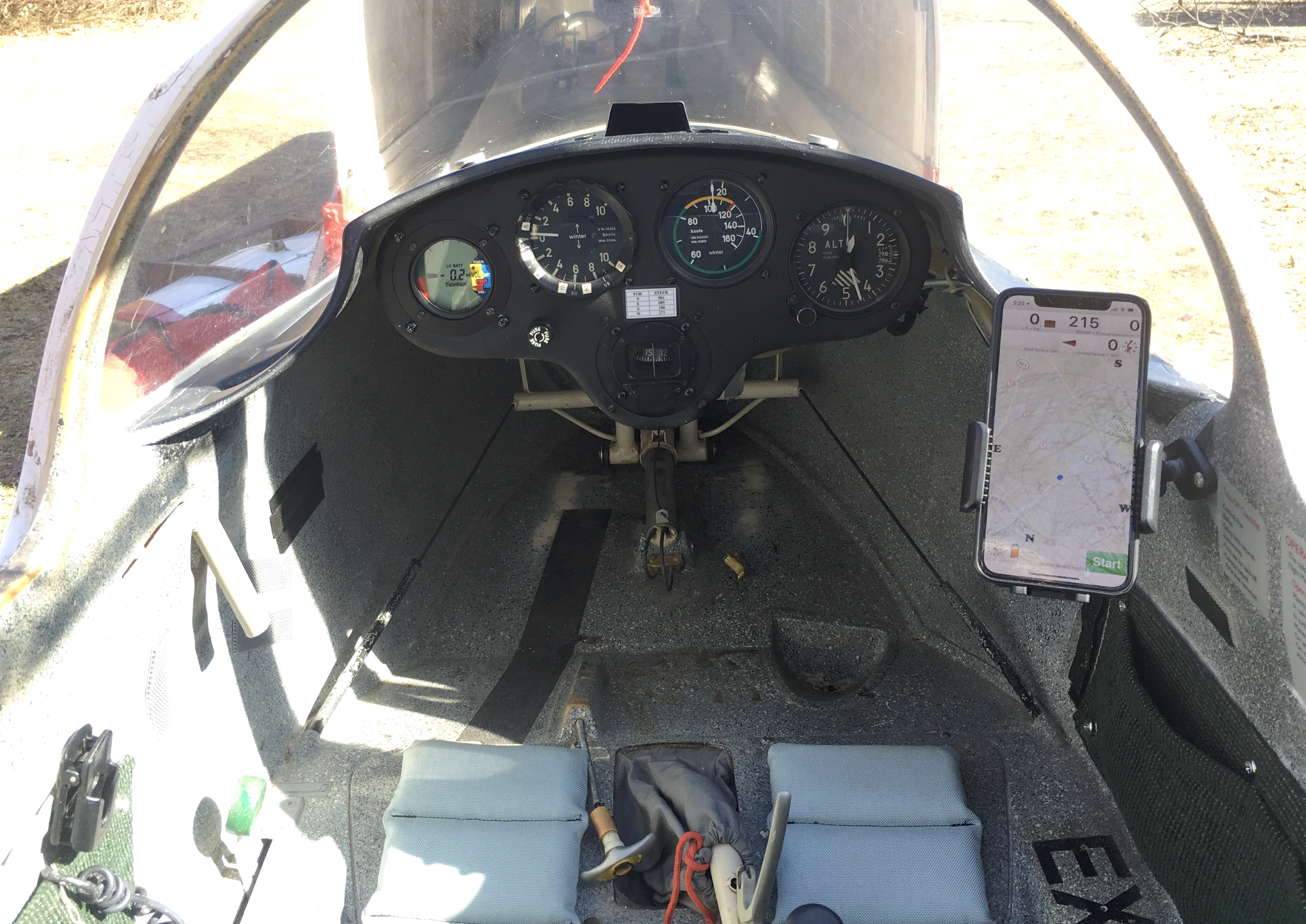
AC4-B Instrument Panel

Model with the main wheel set further back and a nose wheel. Also incorporates a larger cockpit for taller pilots. Introduced in 1996.
AC-4C Russia
Improved model with retractable landing gear. Introduced in 1997.
AC-4CK Russia
Improved model delivered as a kit.
AC-4D Russia
Improved model with winglets.
AC-4M
Motor glider model with a retractable engine, which was used as the prototype for the AC-5M. Introduced in 1999.
Solo AC-4
Current production model.

== Specifications (AC-4) ==
Data from Sailplane Directory and company

General characteristics

- Crew: one
- Length: 5.25 m (17 ft 3 in)
- Wingspan: 12.6 m (41 ft 4 in)
- Height: 0.38 m (1.25 ft)
- Wing area: 7.7 m^{2} (83 sq ft)
- Aspect ratio: 20.5:1
- Airfoil: Wortmann FX-60-157
- Empty weight: 140 kg (309 lb)
- Gross weight: 260 kg (573 lb)

Performance

- Stall speed: 69 km/h (43 mph, 37 kn)
- Never exceed speed: 220 km/h (140 mph, 120 kn)
- g limits: +5.3/-2.65
- Maximum glide ratio: 34:1 at 95 km/h (59 mph)
- Rate of sink: 0.8 m/s (160 ft/min) at 88 km/h (55 mph)
- Wing loading: 32.46 kg/m^{2} (6.65 lb/sq ft)

== See also ==
Related lists

- List of gliders
