= AC6 =

AC6 or AC-6 may refer to:

- Aviastroitel AC-6, a glider
- USS Mars (AC-6), a US Navy refueling ship
- Southern Pacific class AC-6, steam locomotives
- AC-6, a utilization category in electrical engineering, defined by the International Electrotechnical Commission
- Ace Combat 6: Fires of Liberation, a 2007 video game
- Armored Core VI: Fires of Rubicon, a 2023 video game
