= Round Lidingö Race =

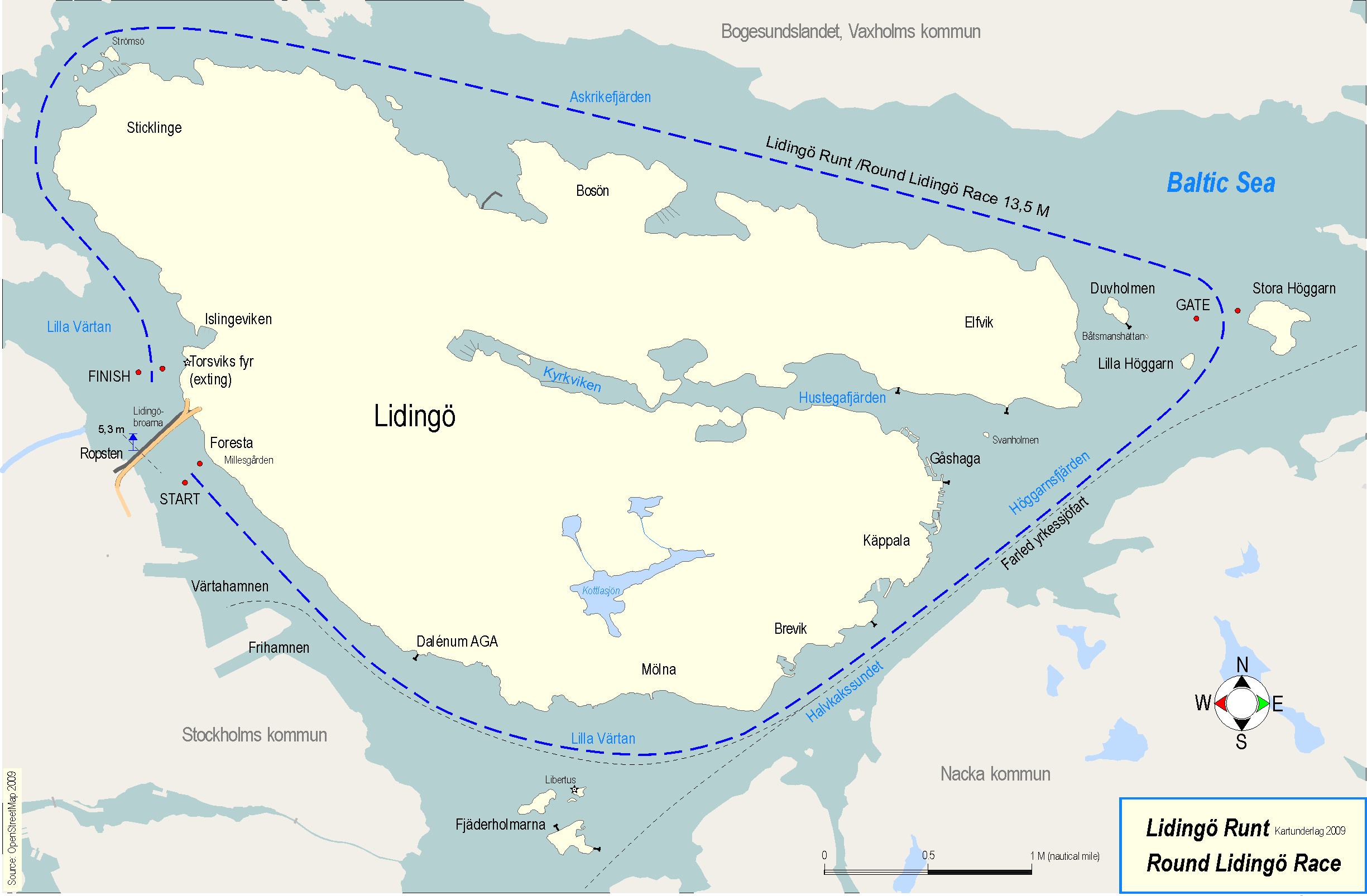
- Course for Round Lidingö Race.
- First held: 1949
- Organizer: Lidingö Segelsällskap
- Champions: Team Tant Raffa (2015)

Round Lidingö Race (Swedish: Lidingö runt), is a one course sailboat race, counter clockwise round Lidingö Municipality in the inner part of Stockholm archipelago arranged by Lidingö Segelsällskap, and is held annually the second Saturday in May, the first one being held in 1949.

== Background ==
The course of the Round Lidingö Race is about 13,5 M. For many sailboats enthusiasts, the race sets the starting point for the sailing season in the Baltic Sea. Usually a couple of extreme racing yachts participate to make the final adjustments for the events to come later on, such as the Round Gotland Race and to increase the general public interest for sailing races, but most of all, a good opportunity to expose the sponsors trademarks. The number of participating boats is about 400–450, most of them with standard family yachts.

== 2009 event ==
In the 2009 race, two extreme boats participated; one Trimaran, type open OMRA 60 and one Super Maxi 100. Fastest boats without regard to LYS. Winds: average West 8- max. 12 m/s:

- Catamaran, type Formula 18, helmsman Pontus Johansson, club Royal Swedish Yacht Club, time: 1 h 27 min.
- Trimaran, type open ORMA 60, Spirit of Titan, helmsman Ulf Bowallius, club DJSK, time: 1 h 28 min.
- Monohull, type Super Maxi 100, Hyundai, helmsman Bertil Söderberg, club Royal Swedish Yacht Club, time: 1 h 37 min.

A family cruiser like Albin Express, average: 2h 30 min.

== Image gallery ==
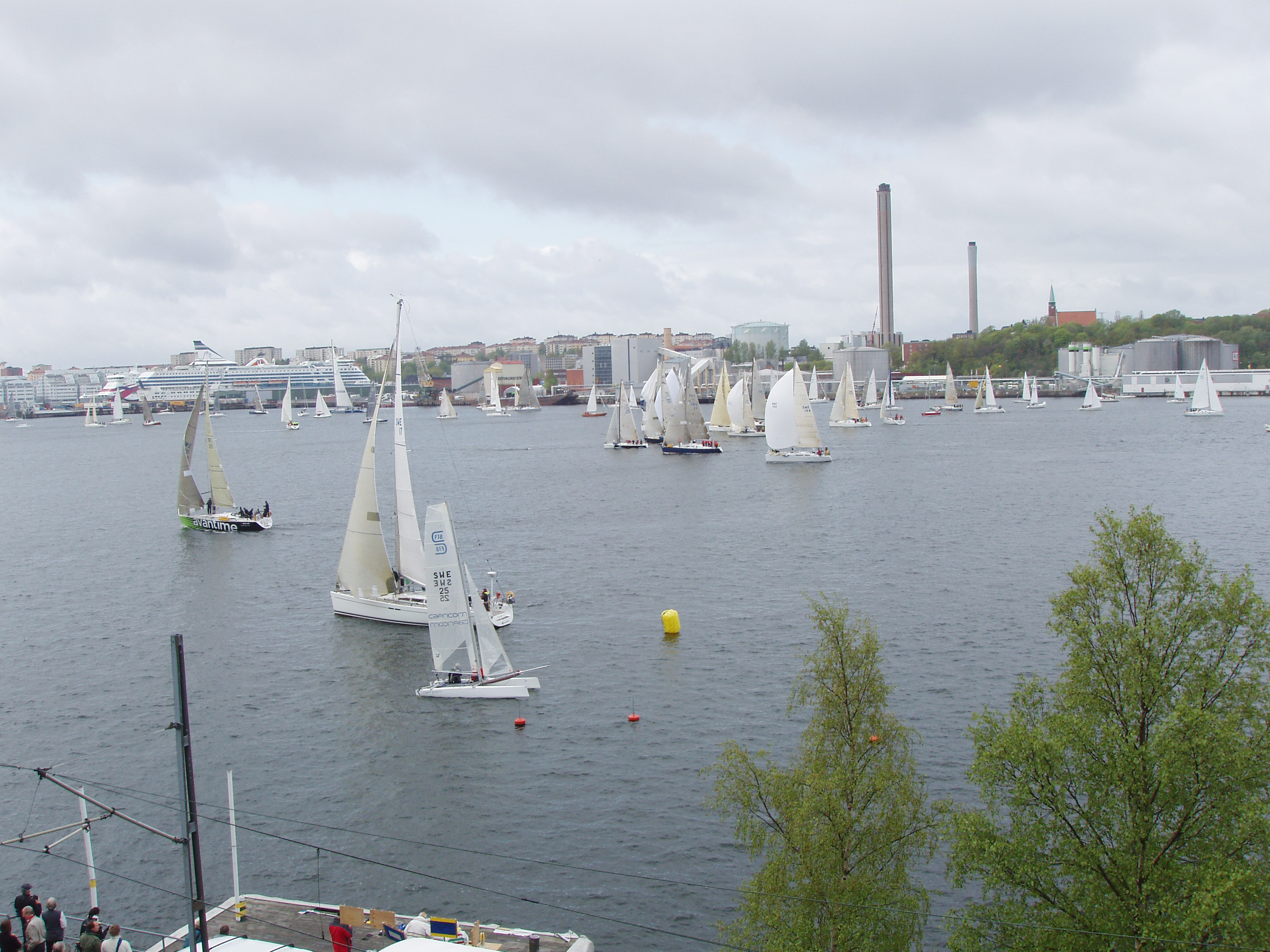
Round Lidingö Race 2009. View from the starting area with Stockholm city in the background.

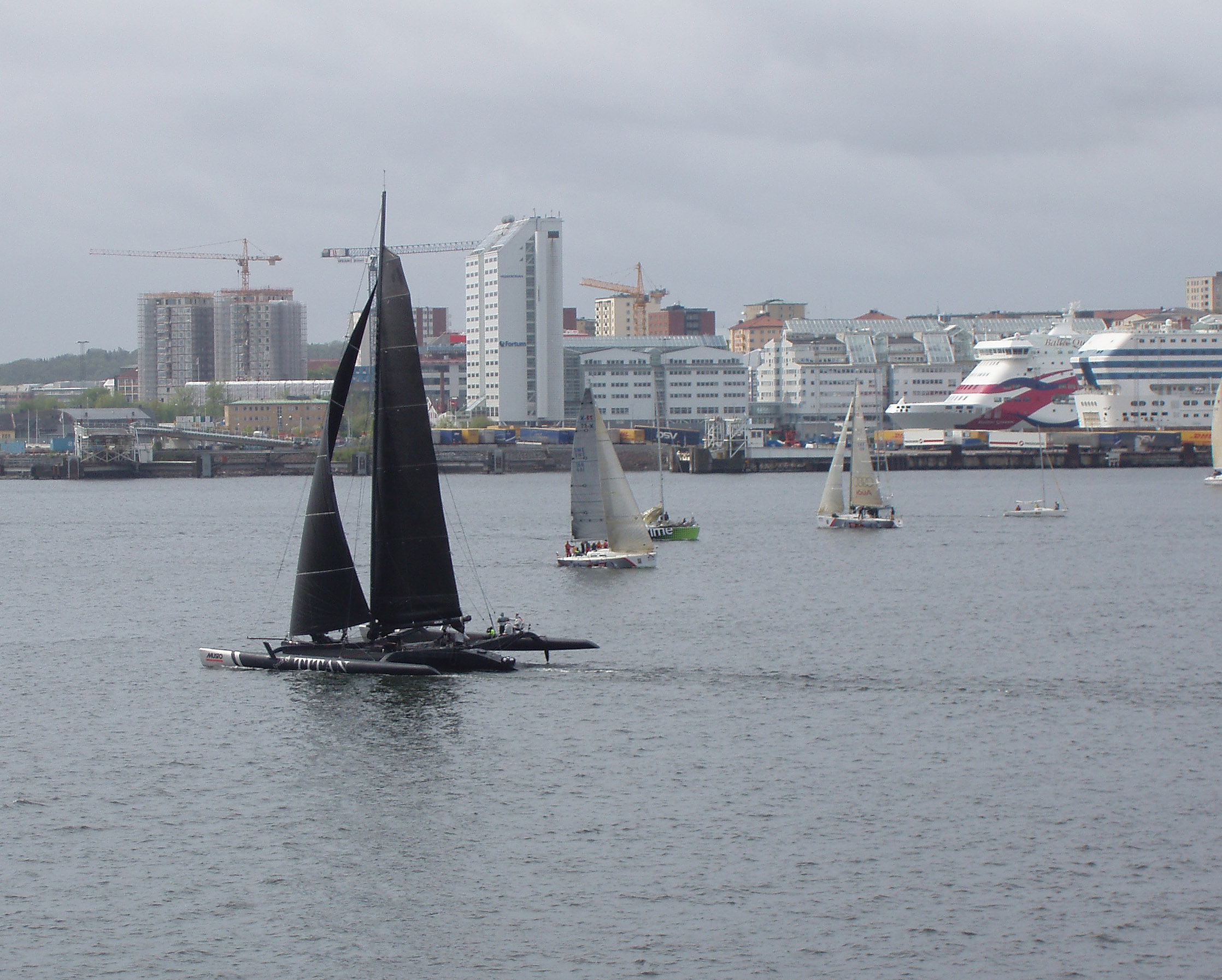
Round Lidingö Race 2009. View from the starting area. Spirit of Titan lets the wind forces loose and starts off.

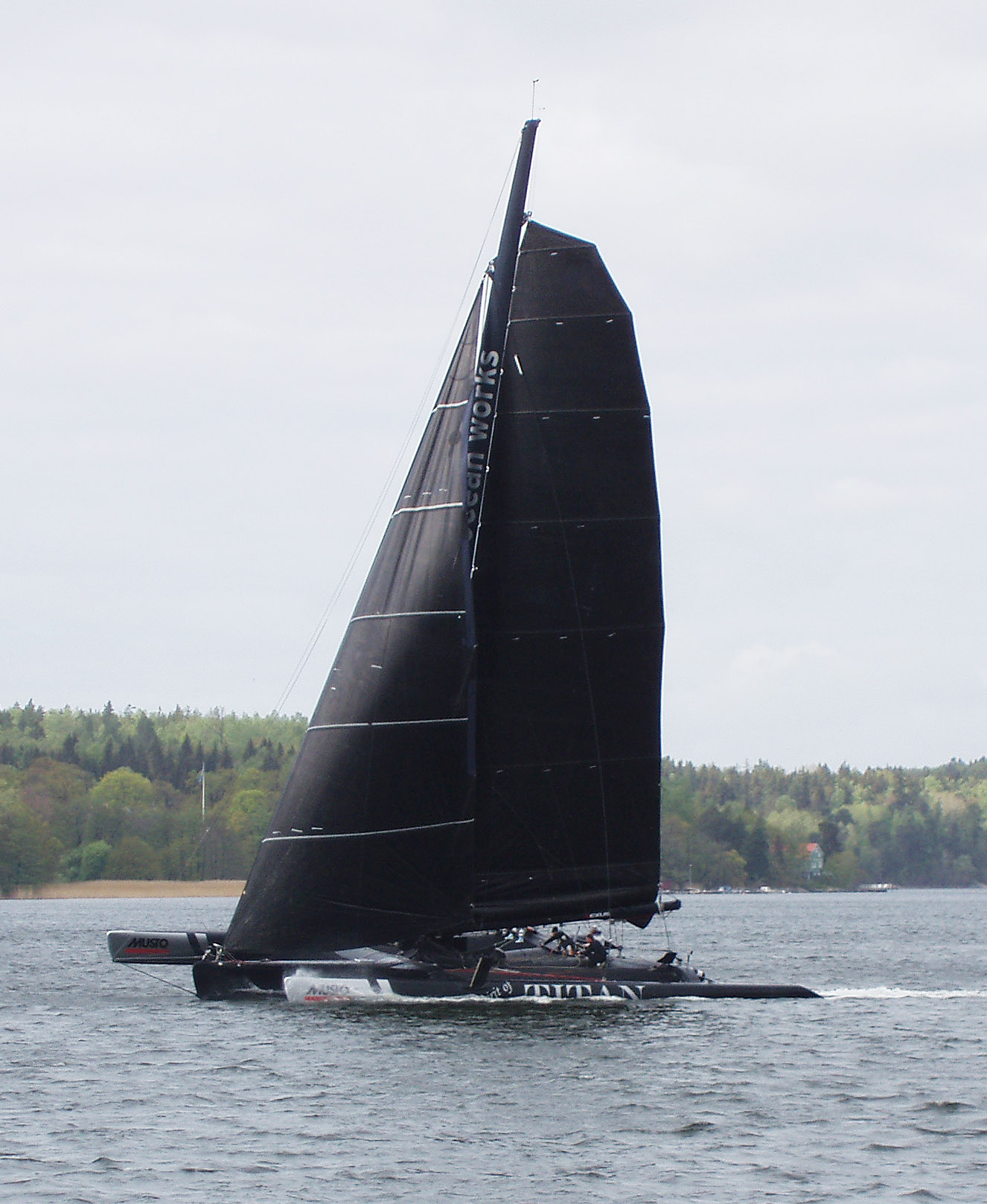
Round Lidingö Race 2009. Spirit of Titan hits the finishing line.

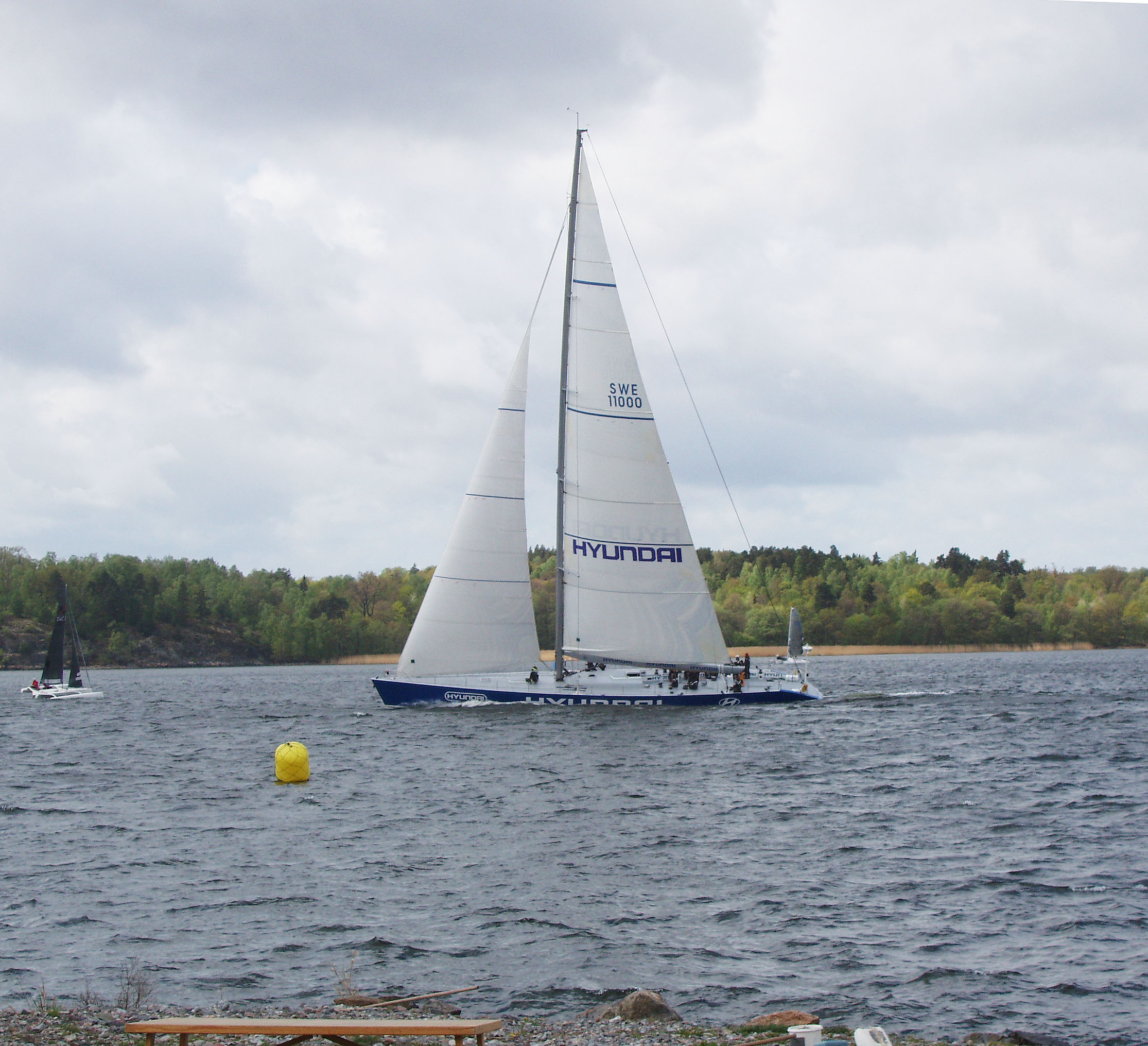
Round Lidingö Race 2009. Hyundai a type Super Maxi 100 boat at the finishing line.

== Sources ==
- LSS (Lidingö Sailboat Club), club presentation page 11, PDF-file (Swedish only)
- Website LSS (Lidingö Sailboat Club), links Kappseglingar ->Lidingö Runt->Seglingsföreskrifter (Swedish only)
