= Round Gotland Race =

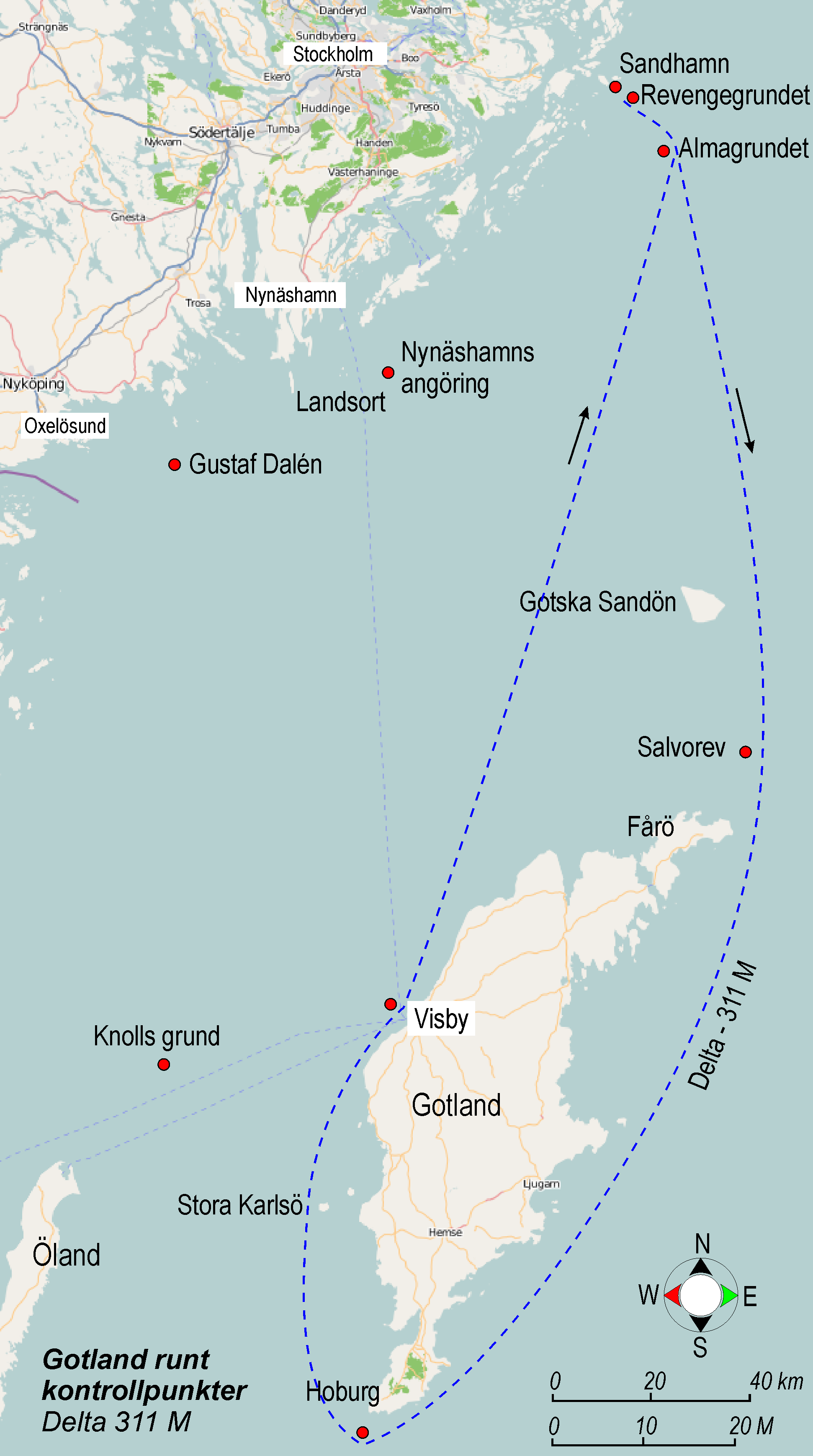
- Round Gotland Race, course "Delta" 311 M.
- First held: 1937
- Organizer: Royal Swedish Yacht Club
- Classes: Big boats, Classic, ORC, LYS
- Start: Sandhamn
- Finish: Sandhamn
- Champions: La Dolce Vita

The Round Gotland Race (Swedish: Gotland runt), for sponsorship reasons referred to as ÅF Offshore Race in commercial situations, is an offshore sailing race in the Baltic Sea, arranged by the Royal Swedish Yacht Club at the turn of the month June/July each year with the starting and finishing lines in Sandhamn in the outskirts of Stockholm archipelago. The two-days regatta is the most prestigious race in the Baltic Sea and have an average of around 300 participating sailing boats.

The competition is divided into eight different classes, sailing on five different courses. The longest, 653 M, is sailed by 60-foot trimarans, the shortest 179 M, for classic boats. The overall victor is appointed in the ORC International class. For the less experienced and family sailors there is the SweLYS/SRS class, which provides the holiday sailors a taste of a real sail-race adventure.

== Maps for the other four courses ==
(Course Delta, see the map at the top of this article.)

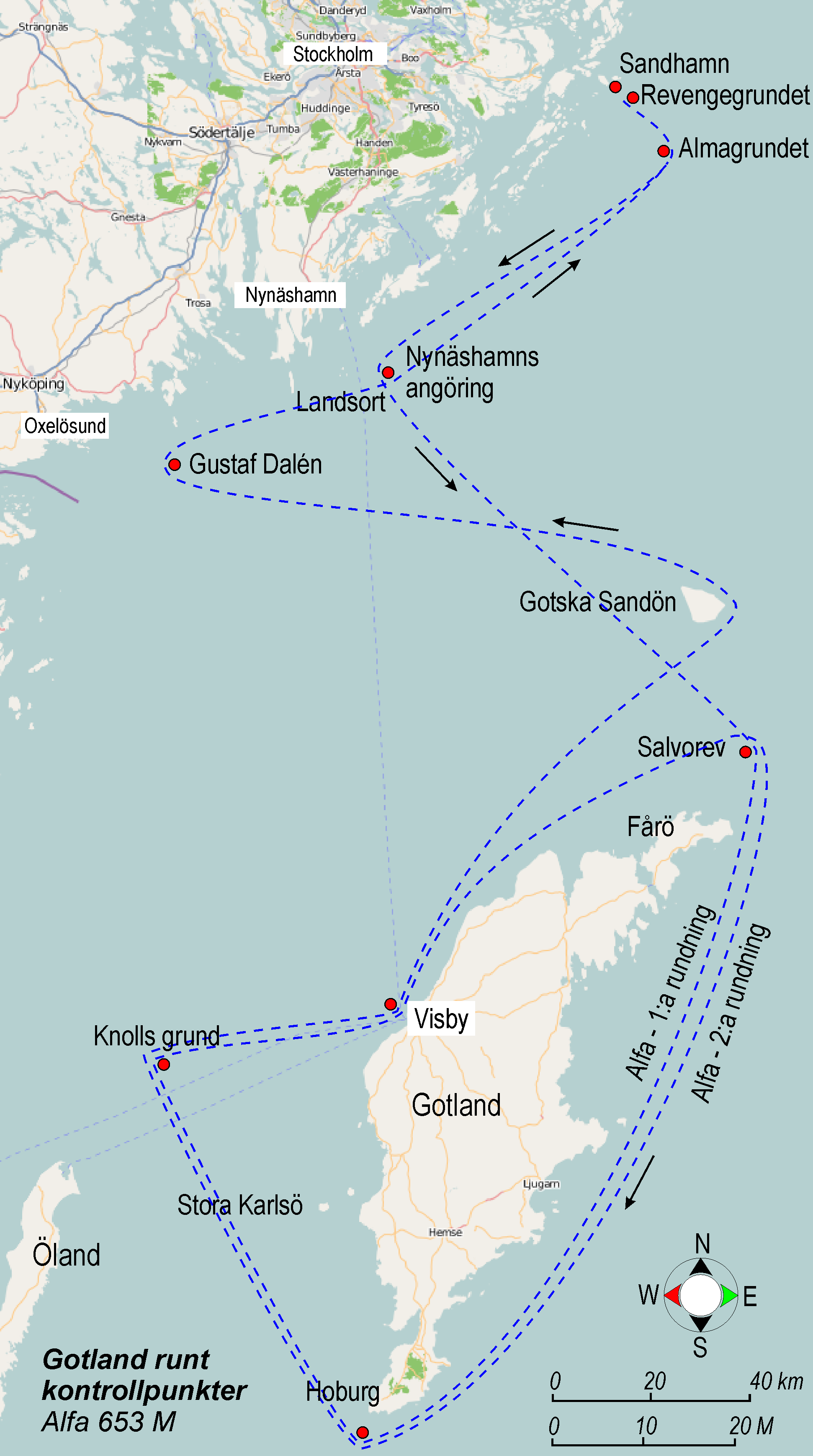
Course "Alfa", 653 M.

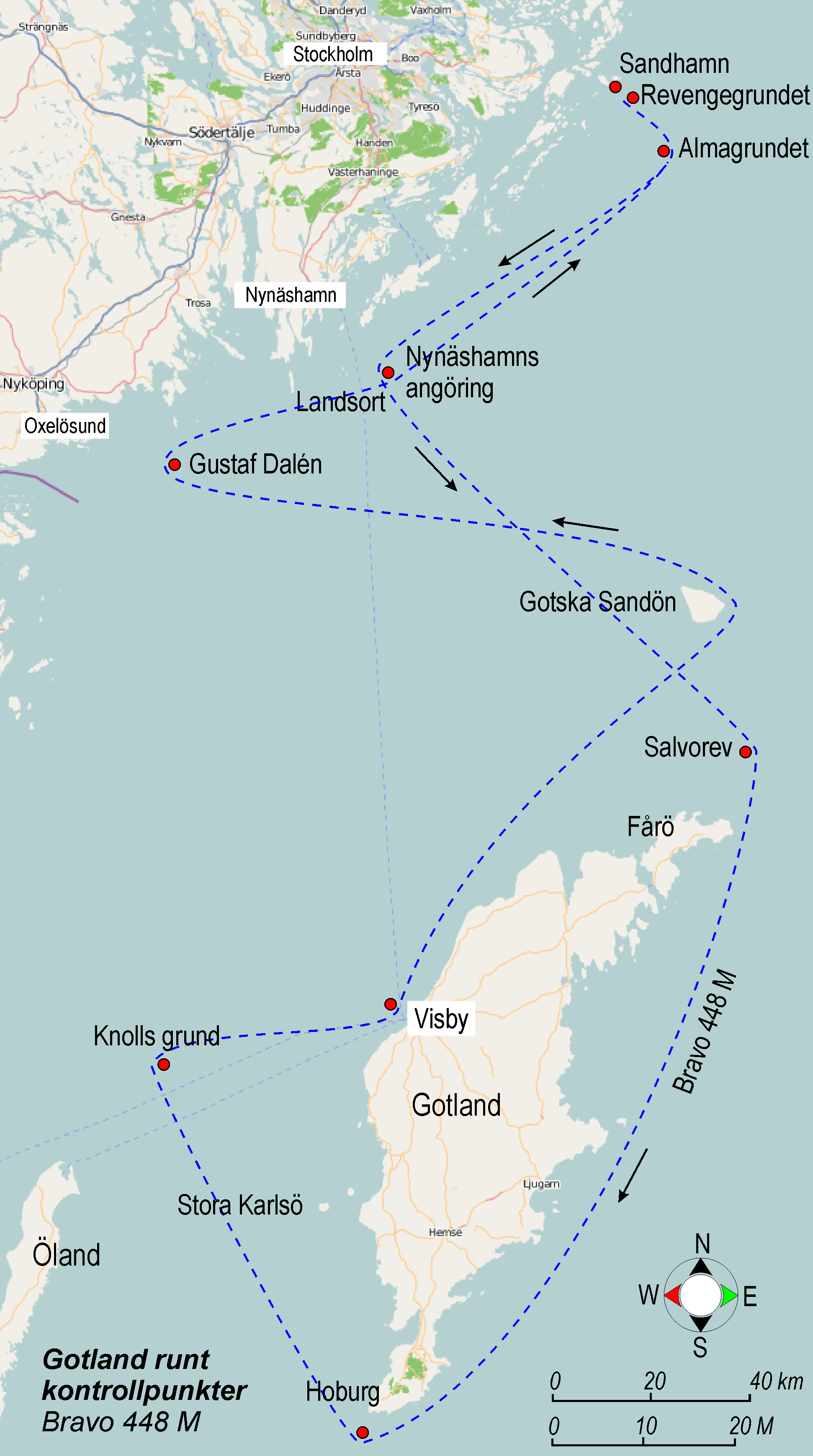
Course "Bravo", 448 M.

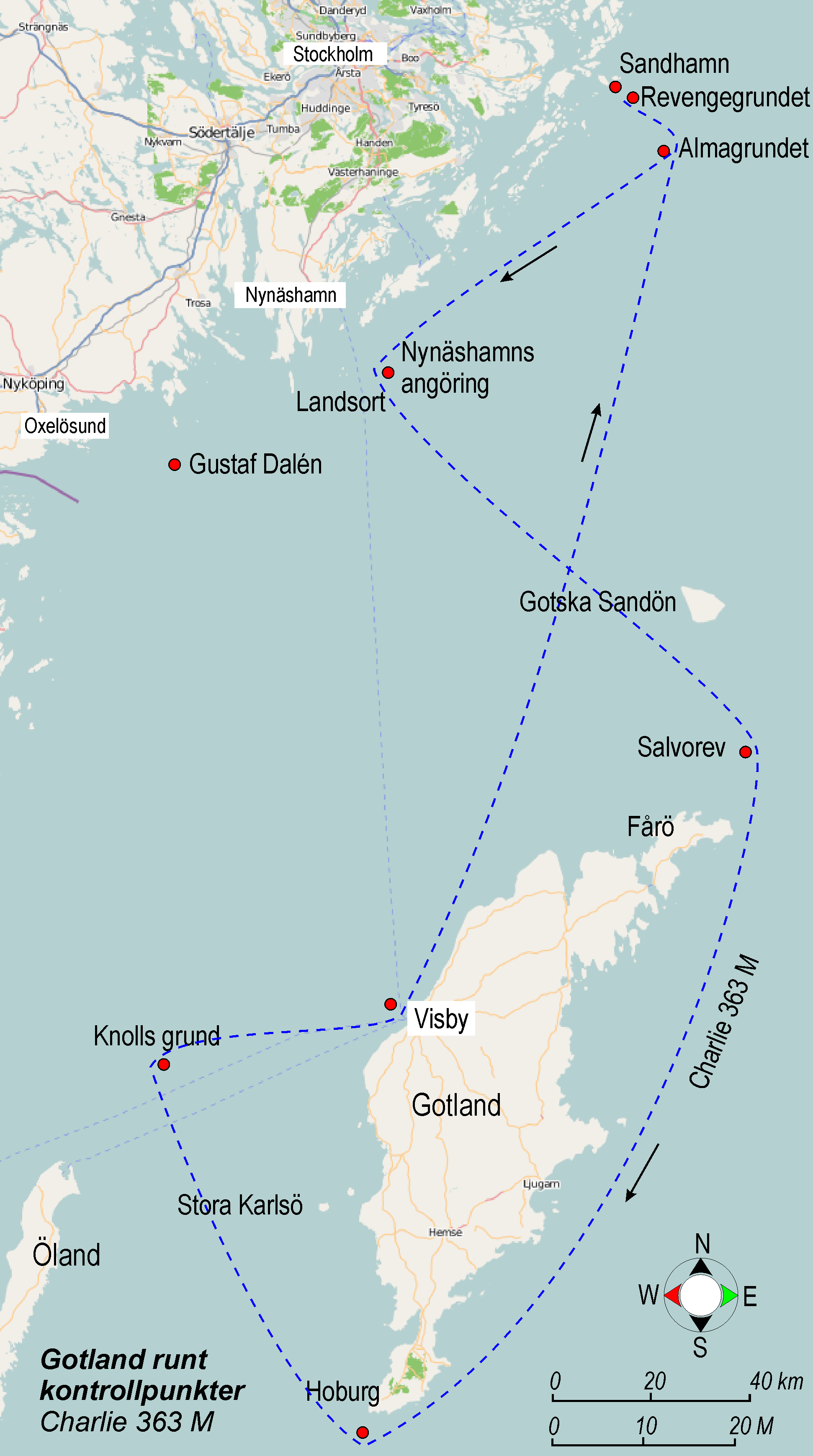
Course "Charlie", 363 M.

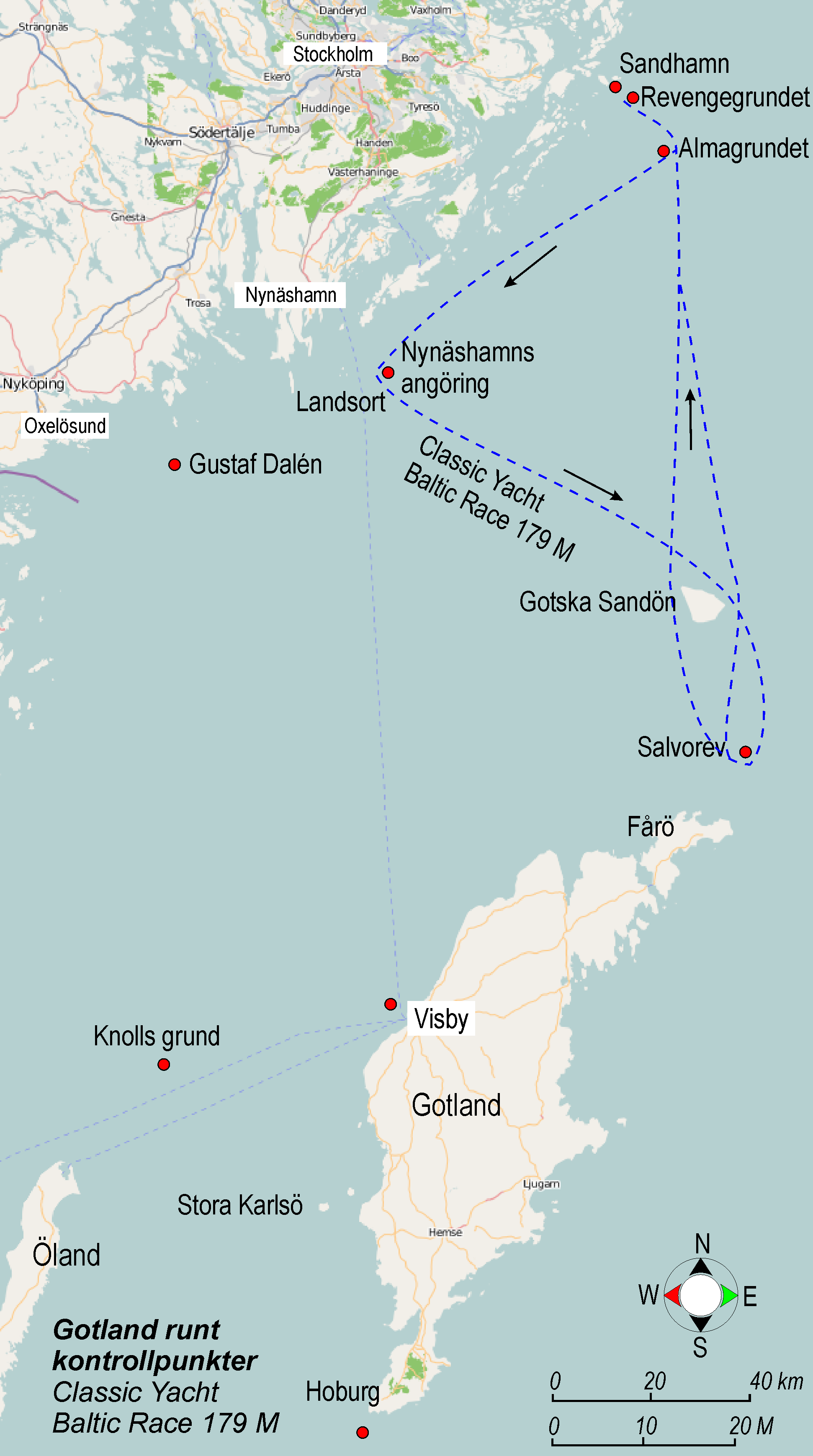
Course "Classic Yacht Baltic Race", 179 M.

Remark: The straight distance between Revengegrundet east of Sandhamn and Visby (course 193°) is almost exactly 100 M.

== History ==
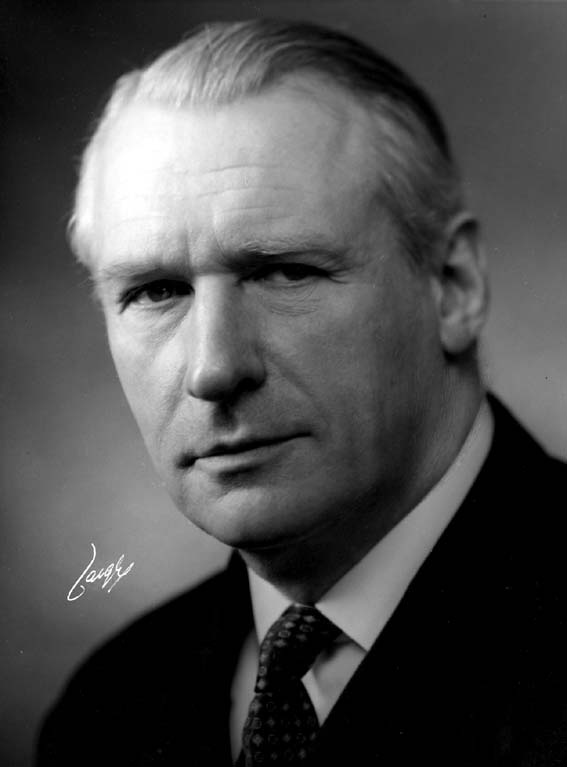
Jacob Wallenberg (1892–1980) won the "Visby Yacht Race" trophy with his Refanut several times.

Gotland Round Race has its roots in a yacht race between Sandhamn and Visby in the early 1920s, called Visby Yacht Race. It was a popular race between large type metre yachts, arranged by Royal Swedish Yacht Club. The course started in Sandhamn down to Visby. After a break in Visby (for dinner and relaxation) the boats returned next day to the finishing line in Sandhamn, but without sailing round Gotland. The course is about 200 M. The last Visby Yacht Race was arranged in 1939 when Jacob Wallenberg (1892–1980) with his 10-metre class yacht Refanut, after the victory in series of races, won the last race and was then entitled to keep the Visby Yacht Race trophy forever.

It was not until 1937 that the course for the first time covered a trip around Gotland. The course was 250 M and the yachts sailed round Gotland counter clockwise (today the race is clockwise), including an extension round a checkpoint north of Öland.

== Image gallery Round Gotland Race ==
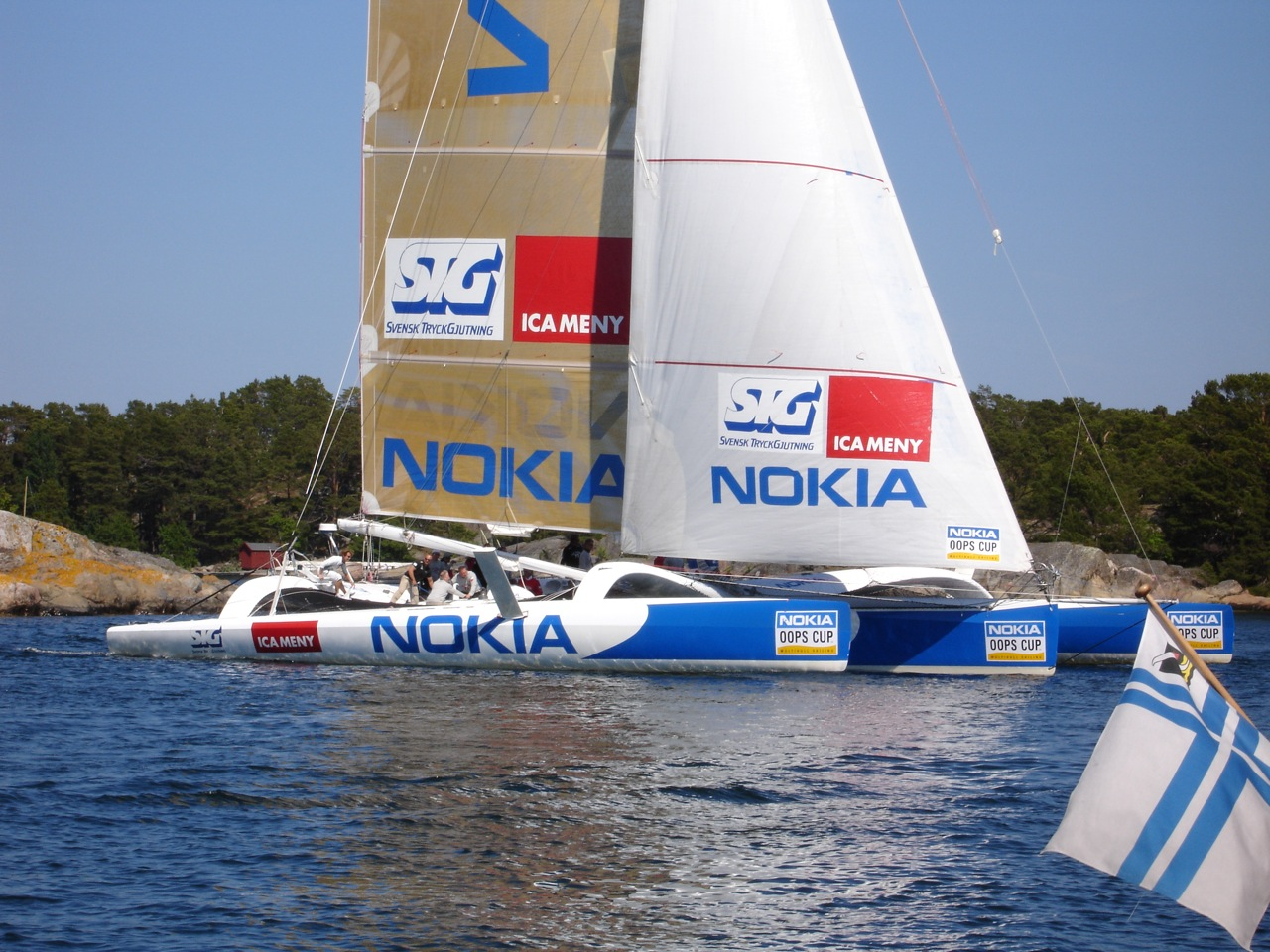
Trimaran Nokia, type open ORMA 60 in Sandhamn, preparing for the start. Photo: July 2005.

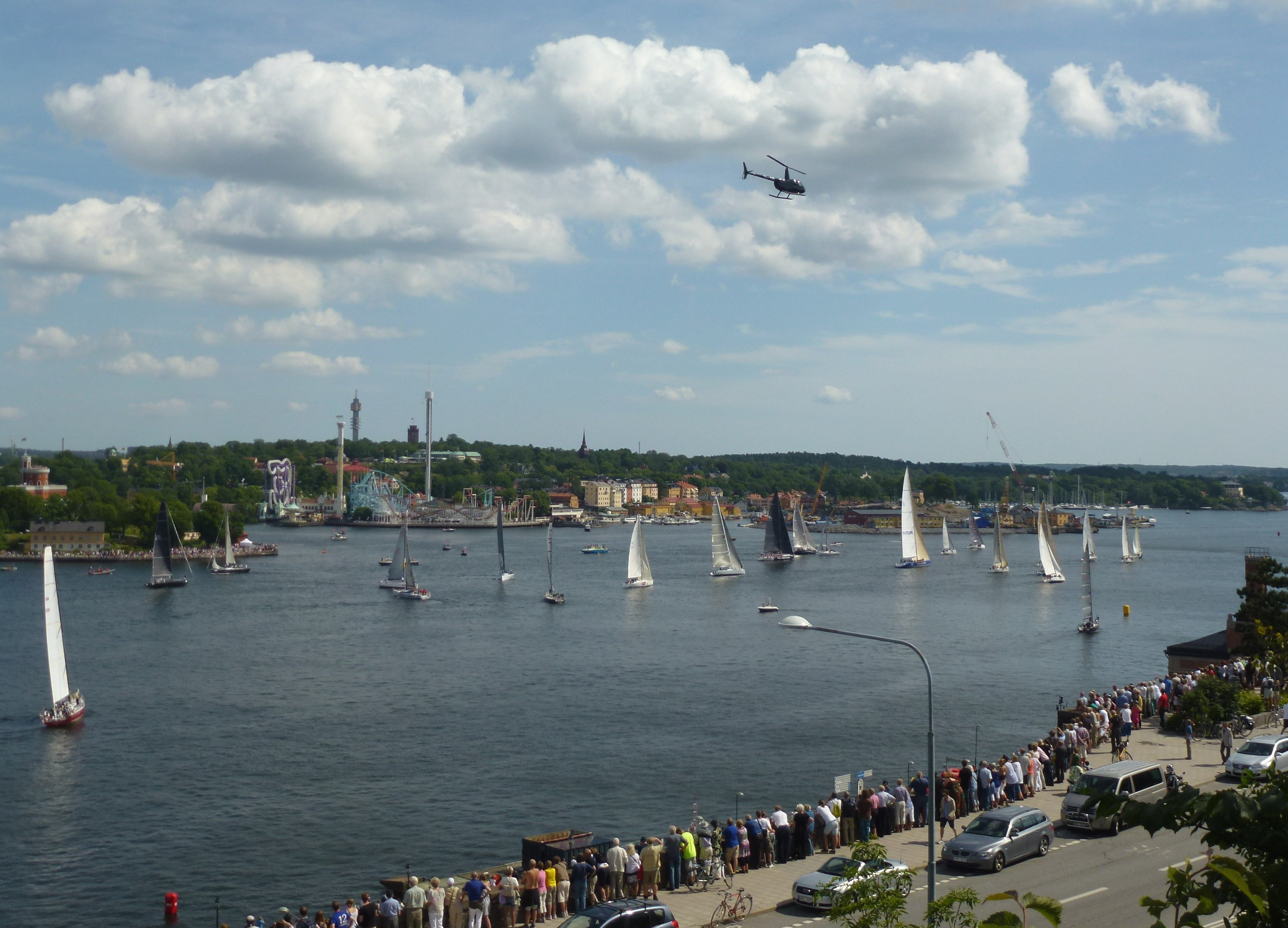
The start of Gotland Runt at Stockholm in 2012.

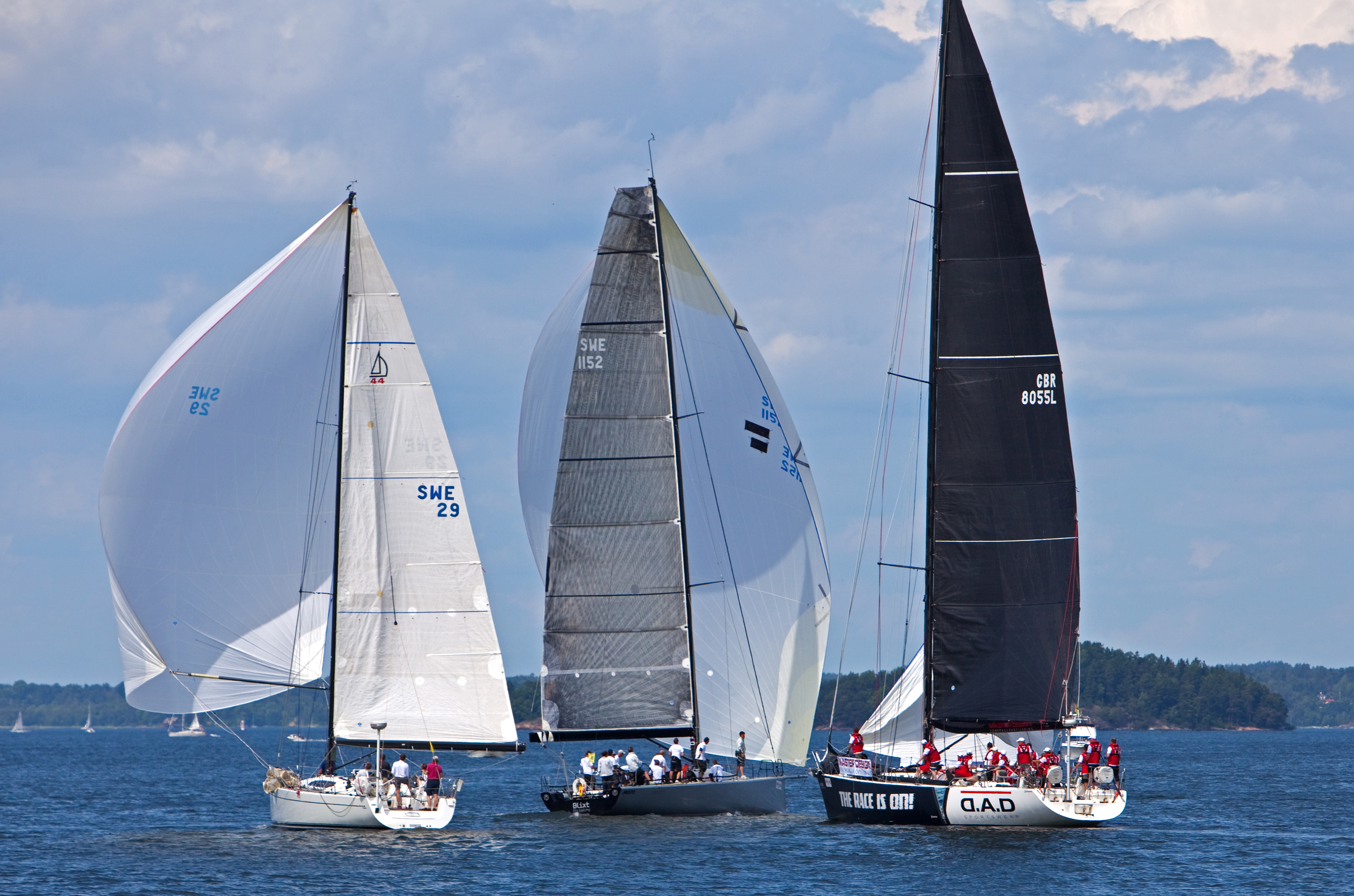
Gotland Runt, 2012.

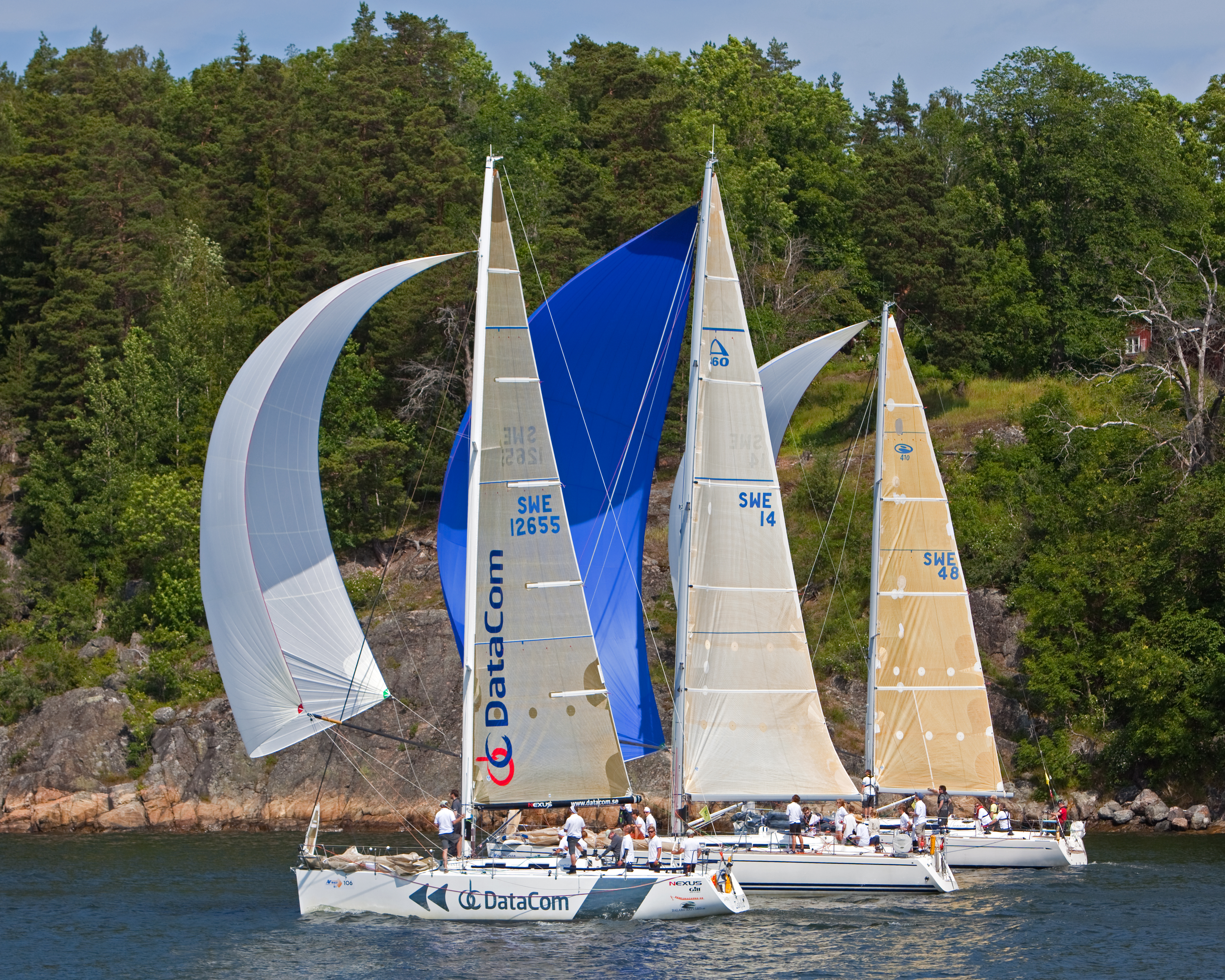
Gotland Runt, 2012.

== Sources ==
- Round Gotland Race, Official website
