= Aviastroitel AC-6 =

Russian glider

AC-6
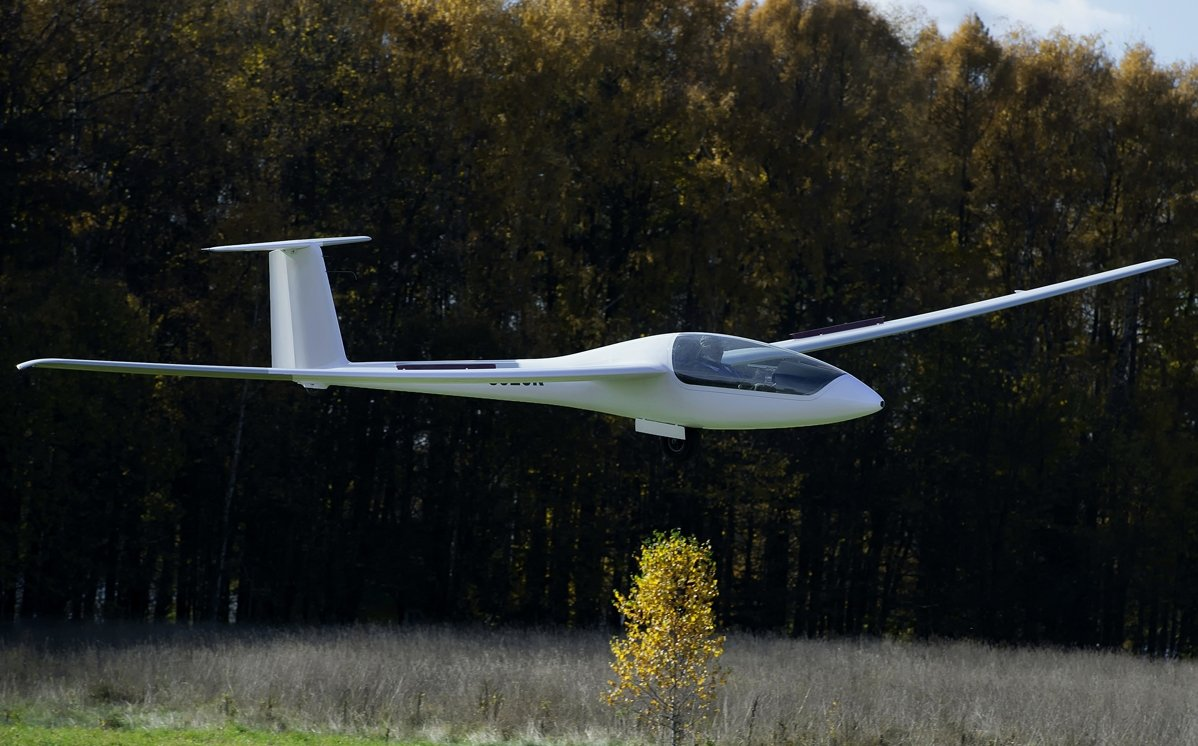

General information
- Type: Motor glider concept Glider production
- National origin: Russia
- Manufacturer: Aviastroitel
- Status: In production

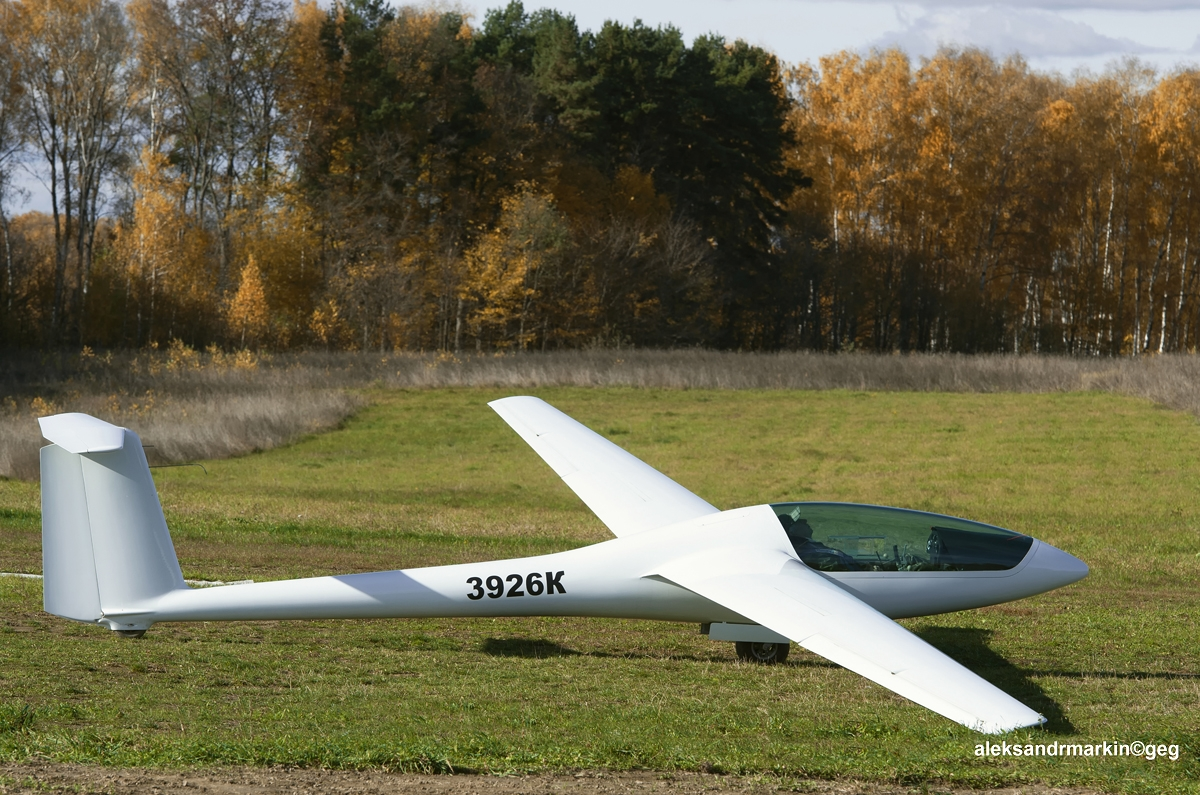
Aviastroitel AC-6

The Aviastroitel AC-6 is a Russian mid-wing, single-seat FAI 15 Metre Class glider that was designed and manufactured by Aviastroitel, now Glider Air Craft.

The aircraft was originally conceived as a retractable engine motor glider, to be a competitor to the Albastar Apis, but instead it was put into production as a conventional unpowered glider.

== Design and development ==
The company states the design goal of the AC-6 as a glider for the competition and training roles, even though it does not have provisions for water ballast.

The AC-6 is a 15 m (49.2 ft) wing span development of the 12.6 m (41.3 ft) span AC-5M, with longer, higher aspect ratio wings terminating in winglets. Like the AC-5, the AC-6 wing employs a Wortmann FX 60-157 airfoil. Assembly of the wing to the fuselage uses a cam pin and incorporates automatic hookups for the ailerons and air brakes. The landing gear is a retractable 360 mm (14.2 in) tire monowheel gear suspended with a pneumatic-hydraulic shock absorber. The wheel has a lever and cable operated drum brake. The cockpit can accommodate pilots up to 190 cm (74.8 in) in height. The canopy provides 300° field of view and is jettisonable.

A two-seat version was also proposed.

== Specifications (AC-6) ==
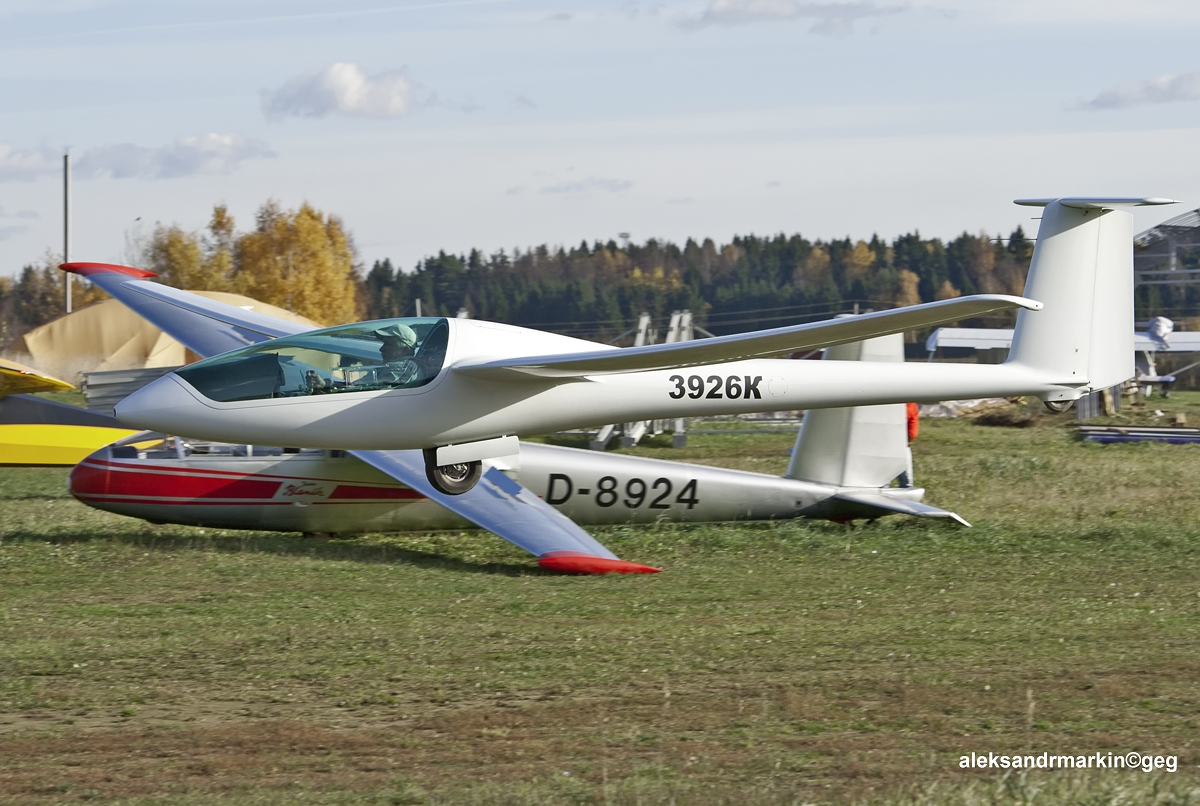
Aviastroitel AC-6 landing

Data from World Directory of Leisure Aviation 2003-04 and company

General characteristics

- Length: 6.75 m (22 ft 2 in)
- Wingspan: 15.00 m (49 ft 3 in)
- Height: 1.3 m (4 ft 3 in)
- Wing area: 9.5 m^{2} (102 sq ft)
- Aspect ratio: 23.6
- Airfoil: Wortmann FX 60-157
- Empty weight: 180 kg (397 lb)
- Gross weight: 300 kg (661 lb)
- Stall speed: 72 km/h (45 mph, 39 kn)
- Never exceed speed: 200 km/h (120 mph, 110 kn)
- g limits: +5.3/-2.65
- Maximum glide ratio: 42:1 at 90 km/h (56 mph)
- Rate of sink: 0.7 m/s (140 ft/min) at 88 km/h (55 mph)
- Wing loading: 31.5 kg/m^{2} (6.5 lb/sq ft)

== See also ==
- List of gliders
