= Roberts Cygnet =

American homebuilt glider

Cygnet

General information
- Type: Glider
- National origin: United States
- Designer: Donald Roberts
- Status: Production completed
- Number built: One

History
- First flight: 1992

The Roberts Cygnet is an American high-wing, cruciform tail, single-seat, glider that was designed and produced by Donald Roberts as a contender for the IGC World Class sailplane.

== Design and development ==
The Cygnet was the sole US entrant in the competition for the World Class sailplane, losing out to the Polish Politechnika Warszawska PW-5. As a result, only one Cygnet was completed. The prototype was finished and first flown in 1992

The aircraft is made from steel tubing and aluminium, with fiberglass fairings. Its 13 m (42.7 ft) span wing employs a Somers-Maughmer SM701 airfoil and features balanced top and bottom DFS-style air brakes for glidepath control. A ballistic parachute was to be standard equipment.

== Operational history ==
In August 2011 the sole Cygnet built was still listed on the US Federal Aviation Administration registry.

== Specifications (Cygnet) ==
Data from Sailplane Directory

General characteristics

- Crew: One
- Wingspan: 42 ft 8 in (13 m)
- Wing area: 103 sq ft (9.6 m^{2})
- Aspect ratio: 18:1
- Airfoil: Somers-Maughmer SM701
- Empty weight: 364 lb (165 kg)
- Gross weight: 606 lb (275 kg)

Performance

- Wing loading: 5.88 lb/sq ft (28.7 kg/m^{2})

== See also ==
Related lists

- List of gliders
