= German submarine U-6 =

U-6 may refer to one of the following German submarines:

- SM U-6 (Germany), was a Type U 5 submarine launched in 1910 and served in the First World War until sunk on 15 September 1915
  - During the First World War, Germany also had these submarines with similar names:
    - SM UB-6, a Type UB I submarine launched in 1915 and sunk on 18 March 1917
    - SM UC-6, a Type UC I submarine launched in 1915 and sunk on 27 September 1917
- German submarine U-6 (1935), a Type IIA submarine that served in the Second World War and was stricken on 7 August 1944
- German submarine U-6 (S185), a Type 205 submarine of the Bundesmarine that was launched in 1963 and sold in 1974

U-6 or U-VI may also refer to:

- SM U-6 (Austria-Hungary), a U-5 class submarine of the Austro-Hungarian Navy
