= Aviastroitel AC-7M =

Russian motorglider

AC-7M

General information
- Type: Motor glider
- National origin: Russia
- Manufacturer: Aviastroitel
- Designer: Vladimir Egorovich Fedorov
- Status: In production (2011)
- Number built: at least two

History
- Introduction date: 2006
- First flight: 2005
- Variant: Aviastroitel AC-7

The Aviastroitel AC-7M is a Russian mid-wing, T-tailed, two-seats in side-by-side configuration motor glider that was designed by Vladimir Egorovich Fedorov and produced by Aviastroitel, now Glider Air Craft.

== Design and development ==
Development of the AC-7M was started in 2002, it was first flown in 2005 and by 2006 two prototypes had been completed.

The AC-7M is a conventional self-launching sailplane, but is equipped with a more powerful retractable pusher configuration Hirth F30A25A 77.2 kW (104 hp) two stroke engine than is normal in these types, allowing it to be also used as a glider tug and as touring motor glider. The aircraft is capable of cruising at 180 km/h (112 mph) for 1,800 km (1,118 mi) while burning only 9 litres per hour (2.0 imp gal/h; 2.4 US gal/h) of fuel.

The AC-7M uses a two bladed wooden propeller of 1.18 m (46 in) diameter. The 18 m (59.1 ft) span wing employs a Wortmann FX60-157 airfoil and mounts Fowler flaps. The wings are mounted on the fuselage with a single cam-pin and the ailerons and air brakes hook-up automatically. The fixed landing gear consists of a narrow track pair of rubber-suspended 360 mm (14.2 in) main wheels, a 310 mm (12.2 in) nose wheel and a 200 mm (7.9 in) tail caster. The main wheels incorporate lever-actuated drum brakes. The cockpit can accommodate pilots up to 190 cm (74.8 in) in height. The canopy provides 300° field of view and is jettisonable. Assembly from its trailer takes four people 20 minutes.

The AC-7M was later developed into the unpowered and redesigned AC-7.

== Variants ==
AC-7M
Side-by-side, two seat motor glider with a retractable Hirth F30A25A 77.2 kW (104 hp) two stroke engine.
AC-7K
Development of the AC-7M, but with a fuselage-mounted Rotax 912ULS 73.5 kW (99 hp) four stroke engine, driving a retractable 1.18 m (46 in) diameter, two bladed wooden propeller.

== Specifications (AC-7M) ==
Data from Company

General characteristics

- Crew: one
- Capacity: one passenger
- Length: 7.15 m (23 ft 5 in)
- Wingspan: 18 m (59 ft 1 in)
- Height: 1.65 m (5 ft 5 in)
- Wing area: 13.5 m^{2} (145 sq ft)
- Aspect ratio: 24:1
- Empty weight: 490 kg (1,080 lb)
- Gross weight: 680 kg (1,499 lb)
- Powerplant: 1 × Hirth F30A25A , 77.2 kW (103.5 hp)
- Propellers: 2-bladed, 1.180 m (3 ft 10 in) diameter

Performance

- Cruise speed: 180 km/h (110 mph, 97 kn)
- Stall speed: 74 km/h (46 mph, 40 kn)
- Never exceed speed: 220 km/h (140 mph, 120 kn)
- Range: 1,800 km (1,100 mi, 970 nmi)
- g limits: +5.3/-2.65
- Maximum glide ratio: 38:1 at 105 km/h (65 mph)
- Rate of climb: 4.5 m/s (890 ft/min)
- Rate of sink: 0.8 m/s (160 ft/min) at 110 km/h (68 mph)
- Wing loading: 50 kg/m^{2} (10 lb/sq ft)

== See also ==
- List of gliders
