= Aviastroitel AC-7 =

Russian two-seat glider

AC-7

General information
- Type: Glider
- National origin: Russia
- Manufacturer: Aviastroitel
- Designer: Vladimir Egorovich Fedorov
- Status: In production

History
- First flight: 2007
- Developed from: Aviastroitel AC-7M

The Aviastroitel AC-7 is a Russian mid-wing, T-tailed, two seats in side-by-side configuration, glider that was designed by Vladimir Egorovich Fedorov and produced by Aviastroitel, now Glider Air Craft. It first flew in 2007.

== Design and development ==
The AC-7 is derived from the AC-7M motor glider, but with a significantly redesigned fuselage. The AC-7 reduced fuselage wetted area as a result of eliminating the engine and propeller mounting space. It retains the two-seats in side-by-side configuration of the motor glider. Also revised is the complex four-wheeled fixed landing gear of the AC-7M, replaced on the AC-7 by a conventional retractable 400 mm (15.7 in) tire, pneumatic-hydraulic suspended, monowheel gear, with a lever-operated hydraulic disc brake.

The aircraft's 18.5 m (60.7 ft) span wing employs a Wortmann FX 60-157 airfoil, mounts Fowler flaps and optional winglets. The wings are mounted to the fuselage with a single cam-pin and the ailerons and air brakes hook-up automatically. Like the AC-7M the AC-7 cockpit can accommodate pilots up to 190 cm (74.8 in) in height. The canopy provides 300° field of view and is jettisonable.

== Specifications (AC-7) ==
Data from Company

General characteristics

- Crew: one
- Capacity: one passenger
- Length: 2.2 m (7.1 ft)
- Wingspan: 18.5 m (60 ft 8 in)
- Height: 1.65 m (5 ft 5 in)
- Wing area: 13.5 m^{2} (145 sq ft)
- Aspect ratio: 24:1
- Airfoil: Wortmann FX 60-157
- Gross weight: 480 kg (1,058 lb)

Performance

- Stall speed: 71 km/h (44 mph, 38 kn)
- Never exceed speed: 220 km/h (140 mph, 120 kn)
- g limits: +5.3/-2.65
- Maximum glide ratio: 40:1 at 115 km/h (71 mph)
- Rate of sink: 0.84 m/s (165 ft/min) at 105 km/h (65 mph)
- Wing loading: 33.5 kg/m^{2} (6.9 lb/sq ft)

== See also ==
Related lists

- List of gliders
