= Politechnika Warszawska PW-6 =

PW-6
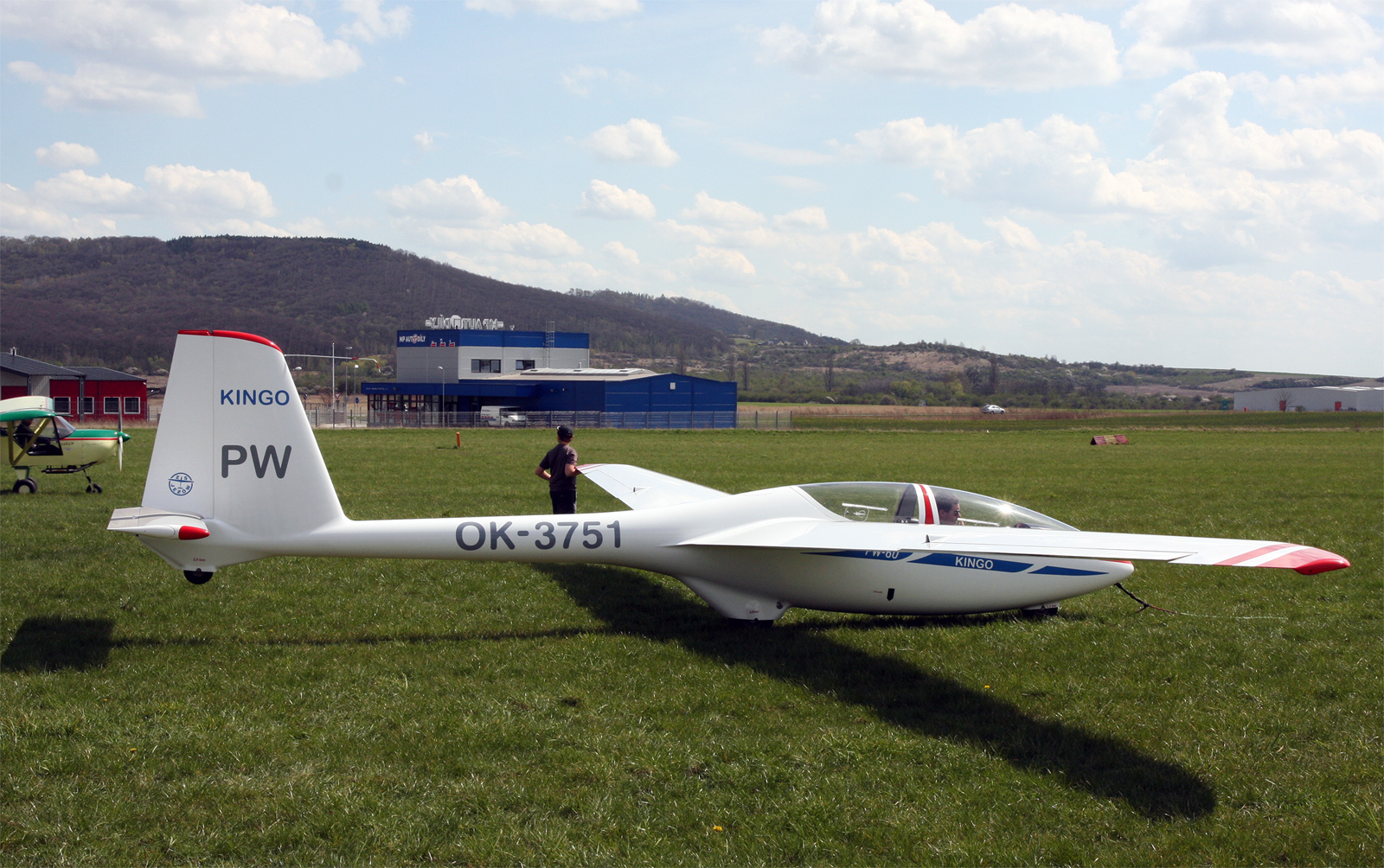
- PW-6U

General information
- Type: Training sailplane
- National origin: Poland
- Manufacturer: Glider Factory JEZOW
- Designer: Politechnika Warszawska chief of designers: mgr inż. Wojciech Frączek
- Number built: ca. 35 by 2008

History
- First flight: July 1998

The Politechnika Warszawska PW-6U is a Polish two-seat training sailplane designed at the Warsaw University of Technology for basic flight instruction and transition training to the PW-5 single-seater. It was manufactured at PZL Świdnik from 2000 and at ZS Jezow from 2007.

== Development ==
The PW-6 was designed to be an ab initio trainer with the capability of providing cross-country training as well. It has handling and performance characteristics similar to the Politechnika Warszawska PW-5. In this way, it was envisaged that the transition to solo flying in the single-seater could be made sooner.

The prototype of the PW-6, built at the Politechnika Warszawska, PZL Świdnik and DWLKK, made its maiden flight from Bemowo Airfield, Warsaw, in July 1998. Type certification was granted in September 2000, after Jerzy Kedzierski and Maciej Lasek completed the test flights. Serial production started at PZL Swidnik soon afterwards, with first deliveries to Egypt, New Zealand, Belgium, Canada, the United States, Portugal and Germany. Production at PZL Swidnik ceased after approximately 26 aircraft had been completed, but resumed at Zaklad Szybowcowy Jezow in 2007.

== Design ==
- Classical shoulder-wing, two-seater, tandem layout, designed in accordance with the requirements of JAR-22 Utility Category.
- Wing shape and profile are similar to the PW-5 design: trapezoid plan with bow-shaped ends, shoulder-set on the fuselage, having a single-spar structure with sandwich shells. Schempp-Hirth-type air brakes extend on the upper wing surface only.
- Fuselage shell of glass-epoxy composite monocoque structure, stiffened with frames. Fabric-covered rudder.
- Fixed undercarriage consisting of a main wheel behind the rear pilot, with a shock absorber and drum brake, a smaller front wheel and a tail wheel to prevent ground scraping if over rotation takes place during take off or landing.
- Two tow releases, for aerotowing and winch-launching.

== Variants ==
The following derivatives were projected, though not built:

- PW-7 Motorglider project: two-seater side-by-side motorglider, with PW-6 wing geometry.
- PW-9A Aerobatic Training Glider, with automatic control connections and tail ballast compartment.
- PW-9M Self Launching Training Glider, with Solo engine and folding propeller.

== Specifications ==
General characteristics

- Crew: Two
- Length: 7.85 m (25 ft 9 in)
- Wingspan: 16.00 m (52 ft 6 in)
- Height: 2.44 m (8 ft 0 in)
- Wing area: 15.3 m^{2} (164 sq ft)
- Aspect ratio: 16.8
- Empty weight: 360 kg (790 lb)
- Gross weight: 546 kg (1,200 lb)

Performance

- Maximum speed: 260 km/h (160 mph, 140 kn)
- Maximum glide ratio: 34
- Rate of sink: 0.75 m/s (147 ft/min)

== See also ==
Related lists

- List of gliders
