= Aviastroitel AC-5M =

Russian motorglider

AC-5M
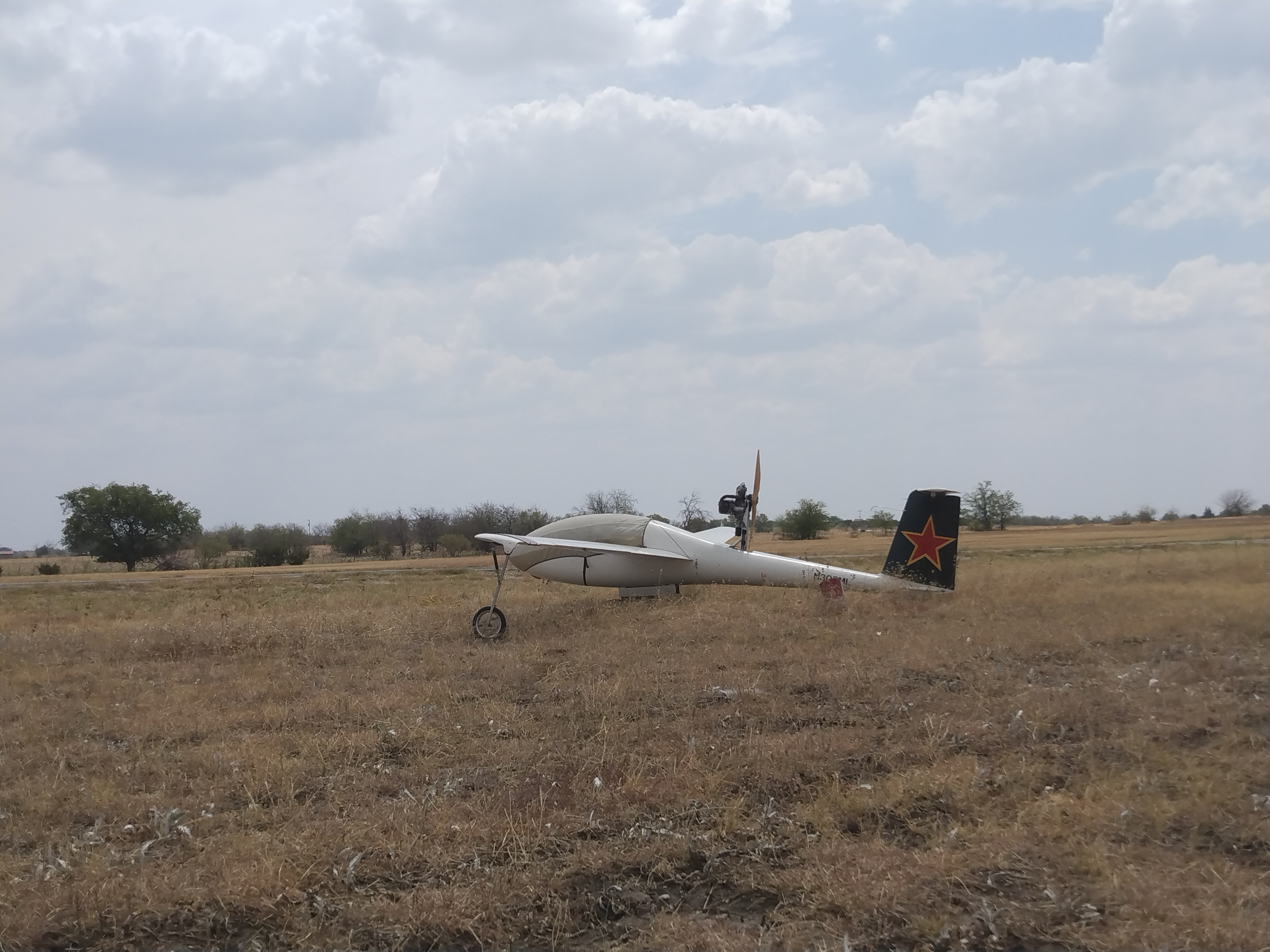
- An AC-5K in a field at Hamilton Municipal Airport.

General information
- Type: Motor glider and Unmanned aerial vehicle
- National origin: Russia
- Manufacturer: Aviastroitel
- Status: In production
- Number built: 35

History
- Manufactured: 2000-2003
- First flight: December 1999
- Developed from: Aviastroitel AC-4 Russia

The Aviastroitel AC-5M is a Russian mid-wing, single-seat, T-tailed motor glider and unmanned aerial vehicle that is produced by Aviastroitel, now Glider Air Craft.

== Design and development ==
The AC-5M is derived from the motorized version of the Aviastroitel AC-4 Russia. Its design goals were to produce a simple and inexpensive self-launching sailplane. It had its first flight in December 1999 and production commenced in 2000 with a total of 35 completed.

The AC-5M features a 12.6 m (41.3 ft) span wing that employs a Wortmann FX60-157 airfoil. The wings are mounted on the fuselage with a single cam-pin and the ailerons and air brakes hook-up automatically. Assembly can be accomplished by one person in five minutes. The engine is a 19 kW (25 hp) Zanzottera MZ-35R, which is a special narrow engine design developed specifically for retractable engine motor gliders. The engine retracts rearwards into a bay behind the cockpit and is closed by two doors for drag reduction. The propeller is a two bladed wooden design of 1.18 m (46 in) diameter. The landing gear is a retractable 310 mm (12.2 in) monowheel gear with a lever-actuated drum brake, but without suspension. The cockpit can accommodate pilots up to 190 cm (74.8 in) in height. The canopy provides 300° field of view and is jettisonable.

In 2003 the aircraft sold for US$33,000.

== Operational history ==
In October 2011 there were 22 AC-5Ms registered with the US Federal Aviation Administration and one registered with Transport Canada. Because the aircraft was never type certified all American examples are in the Experimental - Racing/Exhibition category, while Canadian are in the Limited Category.

== Variants ==
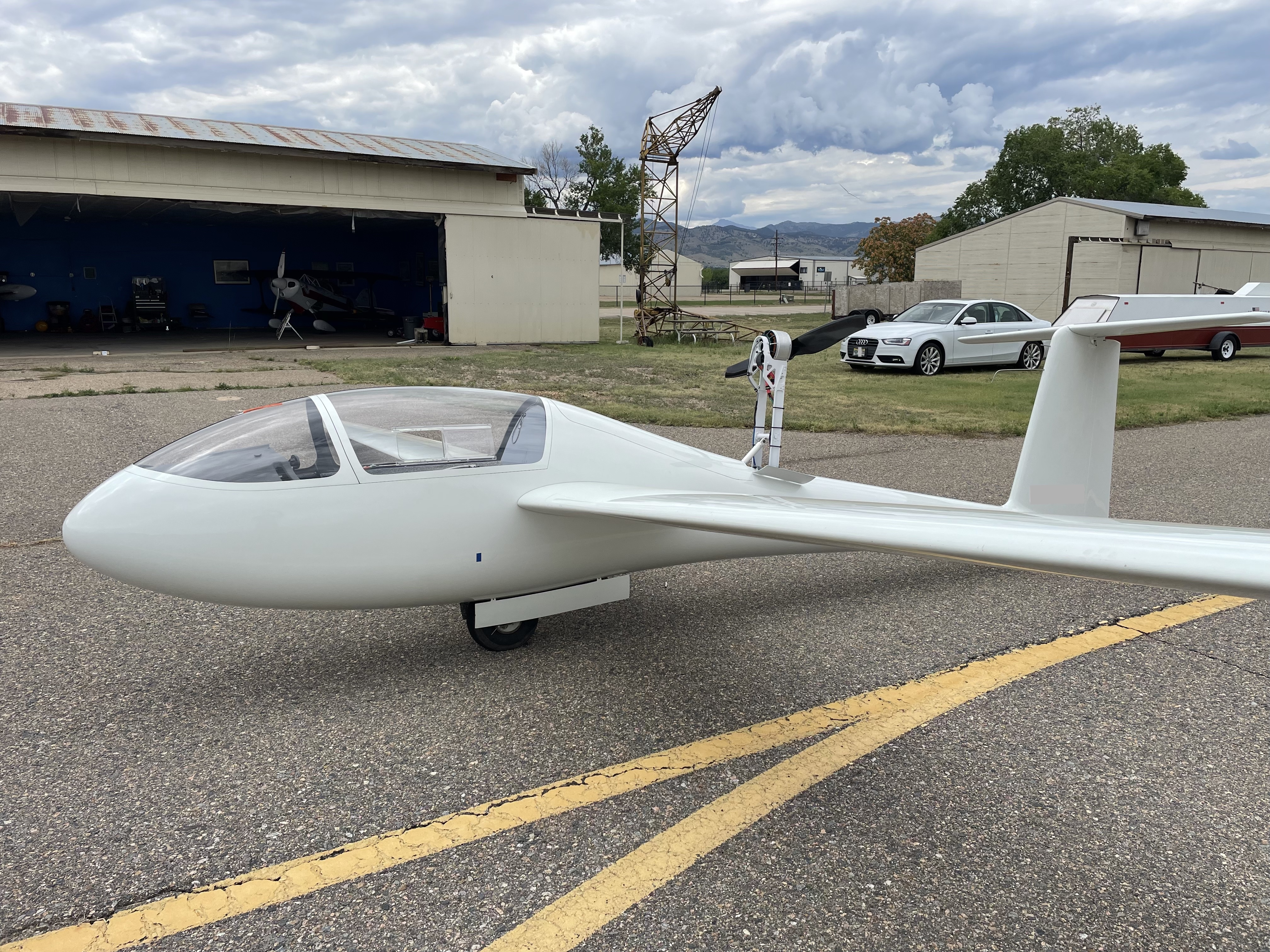
AC-5Me

AC-5M
Single seat motor glider powered by a 19 kW (25 hp) Zanzottera MZ-35R two-stroke powerplant.
AC-5MP
Unmanned aerial vehicle version powered by a 60 kW (80 hp) Rotax 912UL four stroke powerplant mounted on a fixed, non-retractable pylon. This version mounts equipment for satellite navigation, radio remote control, TV monitoring and autonomous operation and was intended to operate at altitudes from 400 to 8,000 m (1,312 to 26,247 ft).
AC-5K
Version of the 5M, but with a fixed 32.3 kW (43 hp) Simonini Victor 1 engine and a retractable two-blade wooden propeller.
AC-5Me
American developed prototype electric propulsion variant powered by a 25 kW (33.5 hp) Rotex RET-60, MGM-Compro HBC-280120-3EI controller and proprietary 4.4 kWh battery pack incorporating 448 Molicel P-26A cells.

== Specifications (AC-5M) ==
Data from World Directory of Leisure Aviation 2003-04 and company

General characteristics

- Crew: one
- Length: 5.3 m (17 ft 5 in)
- Wingspan: 12.6 m (41 ft 4 in)
- Height: 1.3 m (4 ft 3 in)
- Wing area: 7.7 m^{2} (83 sq ft)
- Aspect ratio: 20.5:1
- Airfoil: Wortmann FX60-157
- Empty weight: 180 kg (397 lb)
- Gross weight: 300 kg (661 lb)
- Powerplant: 1 × Zanzottera MZ-35R , 19 kW (25 hp)
- Propellers: 2-bladed retractable

Performance

- Stall speed: 75 km/h (47 mph, 40 kn)
- Never exceed speed: 220 km/h (140 mph, 120 kn)
- g limits: +5.3/-2.65
- Maximum glide ratio: 35:1 at 102 km/h (63 mph)
- Rate of climb: 2.5 m/s (490 ft/min)
- Rate of sink: 0.855 m/s (168.3 ft/min) at 95 km/h (59 mph)
- Wing loading: 39 kg/m^{2} (8.0 lb/sq ft)

== See also ==
- List of gliders
