= SRS (sailing) =

Yacht handicapping system

Svenskt Respitsystem (SRS), formerly known as Leading Yard Stick (LYS) and Lidingö Yard Stick (LYS), is a semi-empirical handicapping system used in yacht racing, primarily in Sweden and other Nordic countries. The first version of the handicap system was developed in 1970 by the Swedish yacht designer Lars-Olof Norlin. He based the system on regatta results from the Round Lidingö Race. His own design, Allegro 27, was used as the benchmark and was by definition assigned a LYS value of 1.00.

Every yacht model has a SRS number that was previously based on results in regattas or, for new models, based on a velocity prediction program (VPP) as in IMS and some other handicapping systems. The SRS number is multiplied by the measured time in order to get the handicap corrected time. Thus, a yacht with SRS 1.30 needs to sail at least 30% faster than a yacht with SRS 1.00 to win over it. Trimarans of the type open OMRA 60, designed for racing only, have SRS values above 3.0.

The system was revised in 2011 and onwards, and is now primarily based on a secret calculation formula that should reflect the performance of each yacht. The formula is secret to prevent development of designs that are optimised for SRS racing.

As the system is semi-empirically based the SRS number for each individual model might be subject for evaluation and eventually change. This particularly applies to new models based on VPP. The system enables yachts of all sizes and types to compete with each other. SRS 1.00 would equal an average boatspeed of 5.5 knots on a circular course at a wind speed of 5.0 m/s.

== SRS numbers ==
The numbers are agreed on by an internordic group. The group is responsible for maintaining a standard list, and agree on SRS values for models that are not yet on the list. If there are sufficient numbers of a specific model, the model will become a standard model.

The standard list is under constant review and change, and an updated list can be found at norlys.org.
