= FS Class 741 II =

Italian steam locomotive

FS Class 741 (2nd)
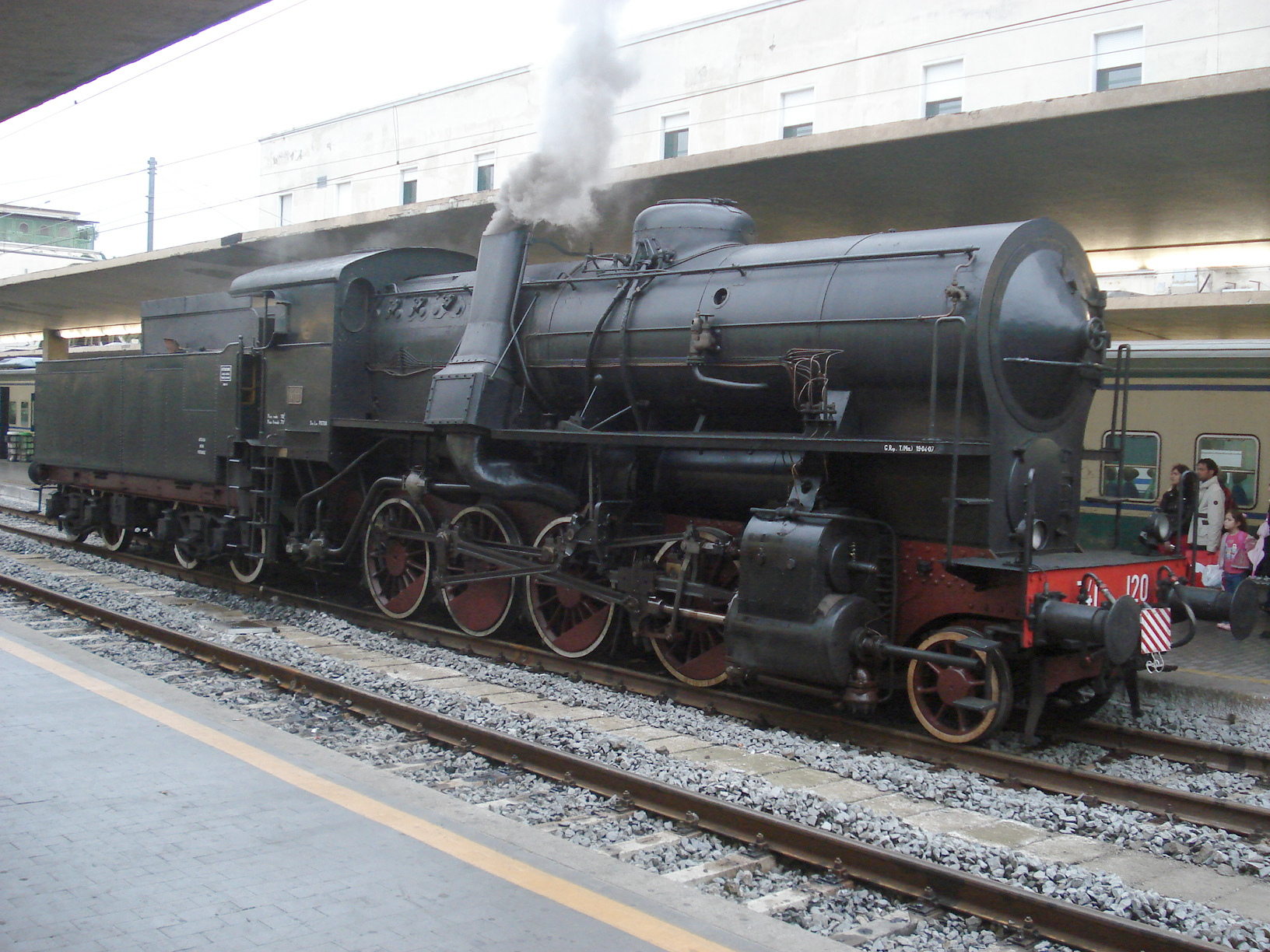
- FS Class 741.120 in 2009 at Firenze Santa Maria Novella
Type and origin
- Power type: Steam
- Total produced: 81
- Rebuilder: Verona Porta Vescovo workshop
- Rebuild date: 1954-1960
Specifications
- Configuration
  - Whyte: 2-8-0
  - UIC: 1′D h2
- Gauge: 1,435 mm (4 ft 8 1/2 in) standard gauge
- Leading dia.: 860 mm (2 ft 9 7/8 in)
- Driver dia.: 1,370 mm (4 ft 5 7/8 in)
- Length: 11,040 mm (36 ft 2 5/8 in)
- Axle load: 14.8 tonnes (14.6 long tons; 16.3 short tons)
- Loco weight: 68.3 tonnes (67.2 long tons; 75.3 short tons)
- Tender weight: Six-wheel tender: 31.9 tonnes (31.4 long tons; 35.2 short tons); Bogie tender: 49.6 tonnes (48.8 long tons; 54.7 short tons)
- Tender type: Three-axle or bogie
- Fuel type: Coal
- Fuel capacity: 6,000 kg (13,000 lb)
- Water cap.: Bogie tender: 22,000 litres (4,800 imp gal; 5,800 US gal)
- Firebox
  - Grate area: 2.8 m^{2} (30 sq ft)
- Boiler pressure: 12 kg/cm^{2} (1.18 MPa; 171 psi)
- Heating surface: 112.6 m^{2} (1,212 sq ft)
- Superheater
  - Heating area: 44 m^{2} (470 sq ft)
- Cylinders: Two, outside
- Cylinder size: 540 mm × 700 mm (21 1/4 in × 27 9/16 in)
- Valve gear: Walschaerts
Performance figures
- Maximum speed: 65 km/h (40 mph)
- Power output: 1,100 CV (809 kW; 1,080 hp)
- Tractive effort: 14,700 kgf (144 kN; 32,400 lbf)

The Ferrovie dello Stato (FS; Italian State Railways) Class 741 is a class of 2-8-0 'Consolidation' steam locomotives, rebuilds from the FS Class 740 with a Franco-Crosti boiler; it was the last class of steam locomotives introduced in Italy.

== Design ==
From 1940 the FS had experimented with the Franco-Crosti boiler, and after World War II it had been applied to several locomotives, including 90 Class 740 which were subsequently reclassified as Class 743. These rebuilds all had the preheater arranged in two barrels placed on the sides of the boiler; this arrangement had the disadvantage of subsequently increasing the axle load (therefore restricting route availability) and stretching the loading gauge to the limit, and precluded similar attempts from interested parties such as the British Railways.

An alternative arrangement had been experimented by the Deutsche Bundesbahn in 1952 on two DRB Class 42 locomotives, in which the barrels were placed below the boiler, which had been appropriately raised. To accede to BR's entreaties, the Società Franco studied a similar concept to transform a Class 740 with a single preheater barrel, and a single chimney placed on the right side of the locomotive, to test the concept (which would eventually lead to the ten Franco-Crosti BR Standard Class 9F locomotives). This concept was also interesting for the FS, as it promised to keep down the axle load, while keeping the system's fuel savings. To keep down the cost of transformations, the boiler was left largely unmodified, and only an exhaust steam injector was fitted.

== Rebuilds ==
The first locomotive was outshopped from the Verona Porta Vescovo workshop in 1954, and was originally classified as Class 743.433; tests showed that the locomotive's performance was practically the same of the two-barreled Franco-Crosti 743, having a power output of 1,100 CV (809 kW; 1,080 hp) at 45 km/h (28 mph), to the Class 740's 980 CV (721 kW; 967 hp) at the same speed, while enjoying a greater route availability. Therefore, in 1958 the FS approved the transformation of a batch of 80 Class 740 locomotives, which were subsequently reclassified as Class 741 (the 743.433 was likewise reclassified as 741.433).

== Service ==
The Class 741 locomotives mainly operated in Sicily and in Veneto; they notably operated on the Pustertal line, renowned among enthusiasts as one of the last Italian lines where steam locomotives were in regular service, up to the latter half of the 1970s. Withdrawals began in 1968, and ended in the early 1980s.

== Preservation ==
Two Class 741 locomotives were preserved:

- The 741.120 was restored for mainline use in 2007 and is currently operational.
- The 741.137 is a static exhibit at the Museo Nazionale Ferroviario di Pietrarsa.

== In popular culture ==
- In Thomas & Friends, Lorenzo (Vincenzo Nicoli) is based on this locomotive.

== Bibliography ==
- Cornolò, Giovanni (July 2014). "Locomotive a vapore". TuttoTreno (3).
- Kalla-Bishop, P. M. (1986). Italian State Railways Steam Locomotives. Abingdon: Tourret Publishing. p. 72. ISBN 0-905878-03-5.
- Kalla-Bishop, P.M. (1986). Italian state railways steam locomotives : together with low-voltage direct current and three-phase motive power. Abingdon: Tourret. ISBN 0905878035.
