= FS Class 740 =

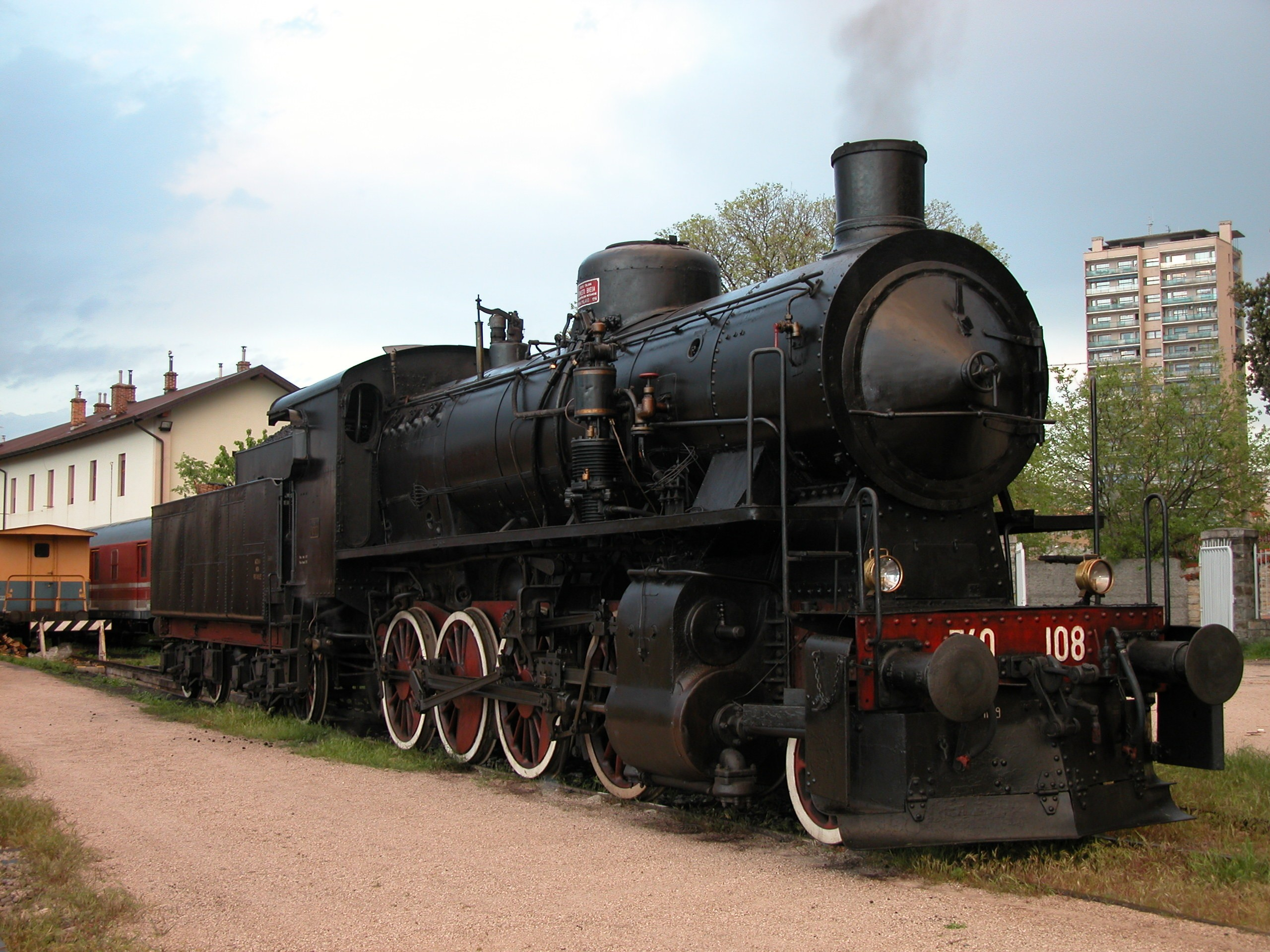
- FS locomotive 740.108 in 2005
Type and origin
- Power type: Steam
- Builder: Gio. Ansaldo & C. (119), Ernesto Breda (87), CM di Saronno (8), Officine Meccaniche (76), Officine Meccaniche e Navali (55), Henschel & Sohn (25); CEMSA (81)
- Build date: 1911–1923
- Total produced: 470
Specifications
- Configuration
  - Whyte: 2-8-0
  - UIC: 1′D h2
- Gauge: 1,435 mm (4 ft 8 1/2 in) standard gauge
- Leading dia.: 860 mm (2 ft 9 7/8 in)
- Driver dia.: 1,370 mm (4 ft 5 7/8 in)
- Length: 11,040 mm (36 ft 2 5/8 in)
- Axle load: 14.1 tonnes (13.9 long tons; 15.5 short tons)
- Loco weight: 66.5 tonnes (65.4 long tons; 73.3 short tons)
- Tender weight: Six-wheel tender: 31.9 tonnes (31.4 long tons; 35.2 short tons); Bogie tender: 49.6 tonnes (48.8 long tons; 54.7 short tons)
- Tender type: Three-axle or bogie
- Fuel type: Coal
- Fuel capacity: 6,000 kg (13,000 lb)
- Water cap.: Six-wheel tender: 12 m^{3} (2,640 imp gal; 3,170 US gal); Bogie tender: 22 m^{3} (4,840 imp gal; 5,810 US gal)
- Firebox
  - Grate area: 2.8 m^{2} (30 sq ft)
- Boiler pressure: 12 kg/cm^{2} (11.8 bar; 171 psi)
- Heating surface: 176.04 m^{2} (1,894.9 sq ft)
- Superheater
  - Heating area: 41.23 m^{2} (443.8 sq ft)
- Cylinders: Two, outside
- Cylinder size: 540 mm × 700 mm (21 1/4 in × 27 9/16 in)
- Valve gear: Walschaerts or Caprotti
Performance figures
- Maximum speed: 65 km/h (40 mph)
- Power output: 980 CV (721 kW; 967 hp)
- Tractive effort: 14,700 kgf (144 kN; 32,400 lbf)

The Ferrovie dello Stato (FS; Italian State Railways) Class 740 (Italian: Gruppo 740) is a class of 2-8-0 'Consolidation' steam locomotives.

== Design and construction ==
The FS Class 740 locomotives were designed as the simple expansion and superheated version of the earlier FS Class 730; after the success of the FS Class 640. The first locomotives were built in 1911 and production continued (albeit with a long interruption caused by World War I) through to late 1923. In total, 470 were built, making the Class 740 the most numerous locomotive to be built for the Ferrovie dello Stato.

The first locomotives of the class were built with right-hand drive, but from 740.204 onwards this was changed to left-hand drive; some had six-wheeled tenders while others had bogeyed tenders giving a higher water capacity.

== Operations ==
Built for heavy freight work, the Class 740 saw service across the whole FS network, with virtually any locomotive shed having had some of them assigned to it at some point; other than freight trains, they were also usually employed for passenger services on secondary lines. Having been built for wide route availability (and therefore requiring a low axle load), they are generally considered successful locomotives, well-suited for the role they were built for, although some have criticised their rather poor steaming. Although their official top speed was set at 65 km/h (40 mph), several locomotives have proved capable of reaching higher speeds of around 80 km/h (50 mph).

The Class 740 remained in active service until the end of regular Italian steam in the 1970s. Some of the class were still assigned to various sheds as reserve motive power into the early 1990s.

== Experiments and conversions ==
=== Caprotti valve gear ===
In 1921, locomotive 740.324 became the first FS locomotive to be fitted experimentally with Caprotti valve gear; the results were satisfactory, and locomotives 740.440–740.445 were modified during construction with the new valve gear and were classified in the separate Class 741, to be renumbered in 1930 as 740.691-697. An improved valve gear was fitted in 1932 to 740.352, which was renumbered 740.852; the valve gear was replaced by standard Walschaerts valve gear in 1955, and the remaining locomotives with Caprotti valve gear (which, although more efficient, required more refined maintenance) were withdrawn by the 1960s.

=== Franco-Crosti locomotives ===
In 1942, five 740 (numbers 339, 367, 392, 396 and 405) were rebuilt with a Franco-Crosti boiler, and fitted with a streamlined casing (more for aesthetical reasons than for any aerodynamic advantages). In 1951, these locomotives (with the casing removed) were renumbered into the FS Class 743, and 88 more were rebuilt until 1953. A modified version, with a single pre-heater under the boiler (instead of two placed alongside it), was classified as FS Class 741, and 81 of them were rebuilt between 1958 and 1960.

== Preservation ==
Forty-nine Class 740 locomotives have survived into preservation. Three of them (the 740.278, 293 and 423) are currently operational and available for heritage trains, while others are under or awaiting restoration.
