= Cab forward =

Design of a vehicle that places the cab farther to the front than usual

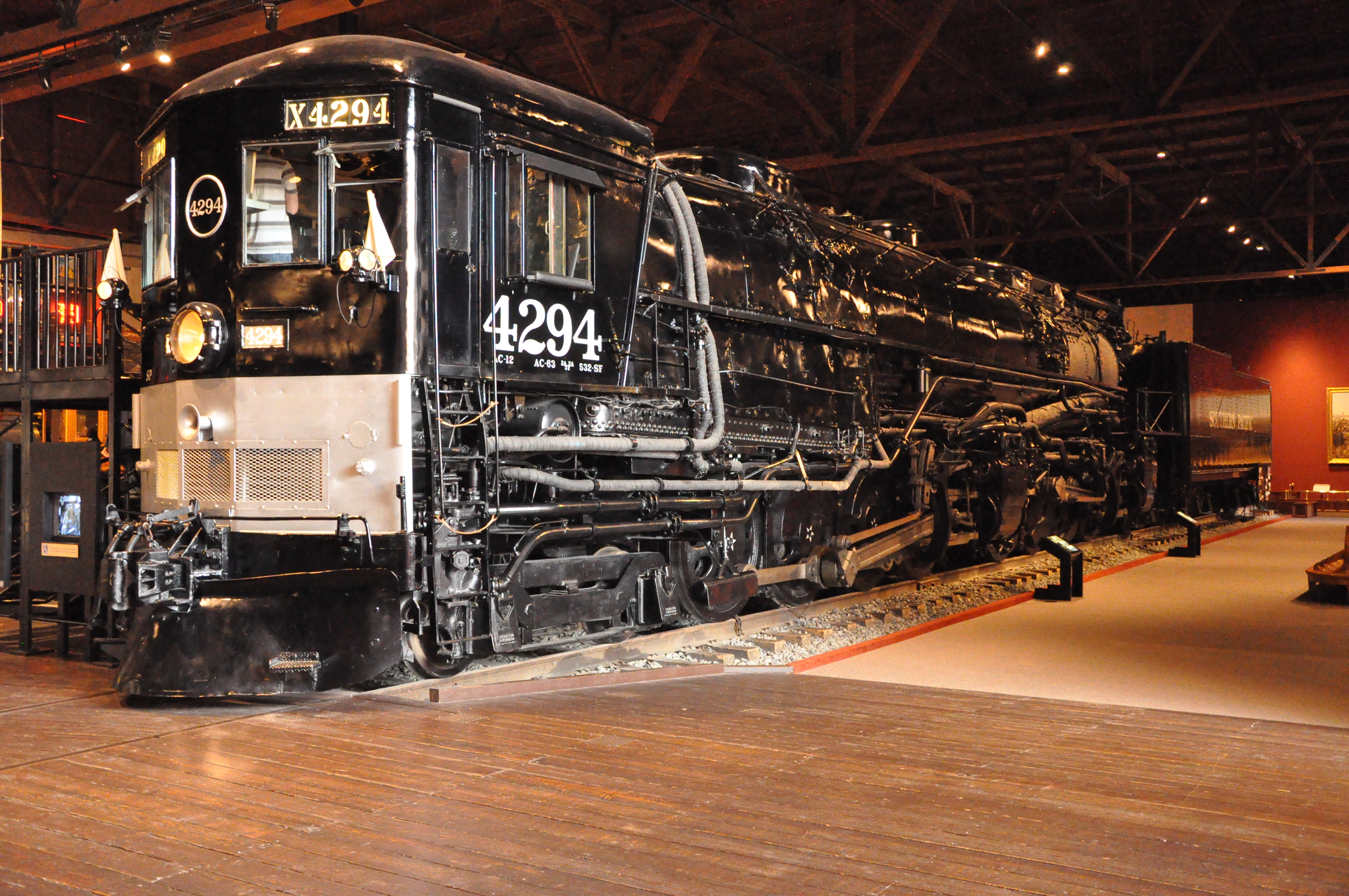
Southern Pacific 4294 on display at the California State Railroad Museum

The term cab forward refers to various rail and road vehicle designs that place the driver's compartment substantially farther towards the front than is common practice.

== Rail locomotives ==
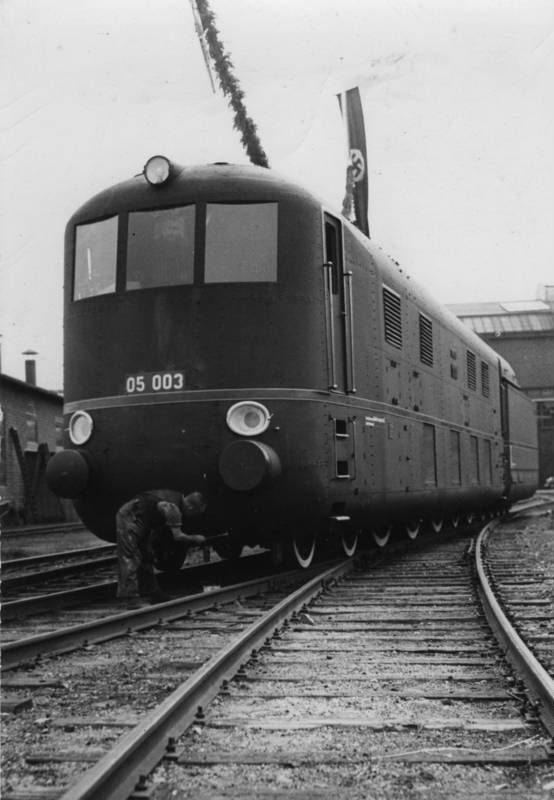
DRG Baureihe 05 #05 003 in 1937

In steam locomotive design, a cab-forward design will typically have the driver's compartment or cab placed forward of the boiler at the very front of the engine. On a coal-fired locomotive, the fireman's station remains on the footplate behind the firebox so as to be next to the tender. On an oil-fired locomotive, the fireman's station could be (and normally is) in the forward cab. This type of design was adapted for a few locomotives throughout Europe in the first half of the 20th century, often in conjunction with an enclosed body design and/or streamlining.

Visibility is greatly improved when the cab is in this position, and in tunnels it does not fill with fumes from the chimney. However, the crew's prospects in the event of a collision are worse, and if the driver and fireman are in separate places it is difficult for them to communicate, just as in autotrains.

=== Germany: Deutsche Reichsbahn ===
In Germany, Borsig in Berlin built a one-off streamlined cab-forward DRG Class 05 (serial number 05 003) 4-6-4 in 1937, with further development stopped by World War II. Fueled by pulverized coal and with the firebox at the forward end, this loco was built with huge driving wheels, 2,300 mm (91 in) in diameter. The design speed was 175 km/h (109 mph), but its conventional layout sister 05 002 set a new world speed record for steam locomotives on 11 May 1936, after reaching 200.4 km/h (124.5 mph) on the Berlin–Hamburg line hauling a 197 t train, a record it lost two years later to the British LNER Class A4 4468 Mallard. In 1944, the streamlining was removed, but the 05 003 had by then already lost its cab-forward layout. After the war, it pulled express trains in West Germany until 1958. It was scrapped in 1960.

=== Italy: Ferrovie dello Stato italiane ===
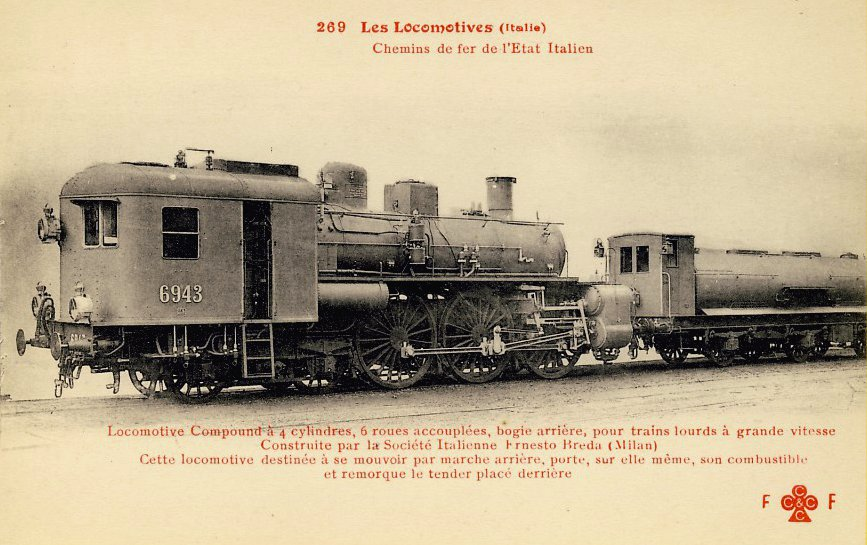
Italian cab-forward locomotive, group 670

The state-owned Italian Ferrovie dello Stato had several cab-forward locomotives, Class 670 and 671. These 4-6-0 engines had a three-axle tender, and were nicknamed "mucca" (cow). The engines (construction year 1902, top speed 110 km/h) were used to haul passenger trains on the Milan–Venice railway. A single Class 671 cab-forward was rebuilt as a Class 672 with a Franco-Crosti boiler in 1939.

=== United States ===
==== Forney design ====
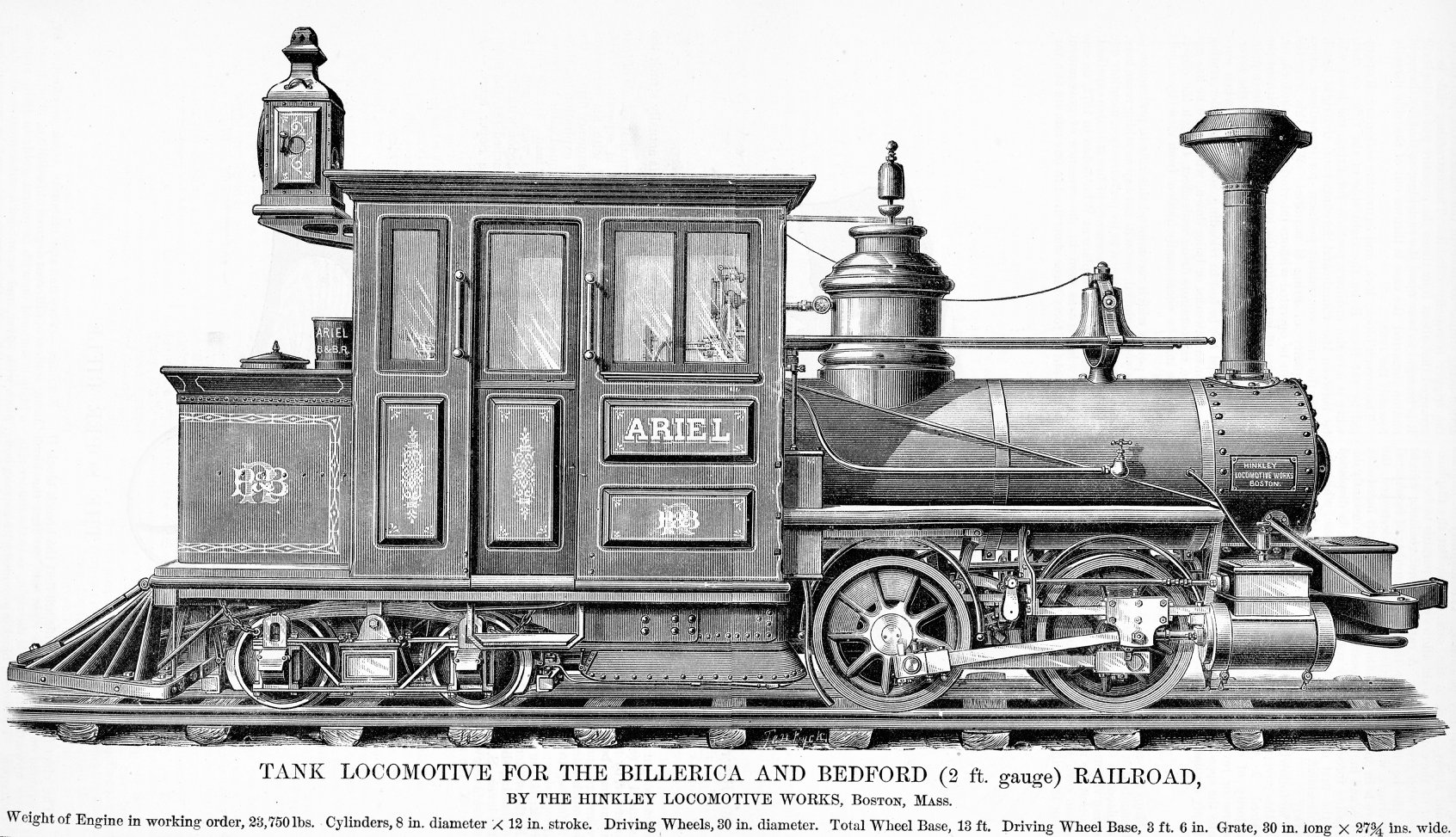
"Ariel", a Forney-type cab-forward locomotive: Front is to the left in this image. (Note location of headlight and cowcatcher.)

Matthias N. Forney was issued a patent in the late 1860s for a new locomotive design. He had set out to improve the factor of adhesion by putting as much of the boiler's weight as possible on the driving wheels, omitting the pilot wheels from beneath the front of the boiler. Such a design would not have been stable at high speeds on the rather uneven tracks which were common at the time. Instead, he extended the locomotive frame behind the cab, placing a four-wheel truck beneath the water tank and coal bunker. In conventional Whyte notation, this resulted in a 0-4-4T locomotive, but when run in reverse it was effectively a 4-4-0T, with the track stability of that popular wheel arrangement, along with unobstructed visibility for the engineer, and improved dispersal of smoke and steam.

Forney's design proved ideal for the small, nimble locomotives for elevated and commuter railroads, and he licensed the patent design to many manufacturers. Large numbers of Forneys served in New York City, Boston, Chicago and elsewhere, but were superseded at the end of the nineteenth century by electrification and the development of subways.

Ariel and Puck were 2 ft (610 mm) gauge locomotives built to the Forney cab-forward design for the Billerica and Bedford Railroad in 1877 by Hinkley Locomotive Works of Boston.

==== Southern Pacific Railroad ====
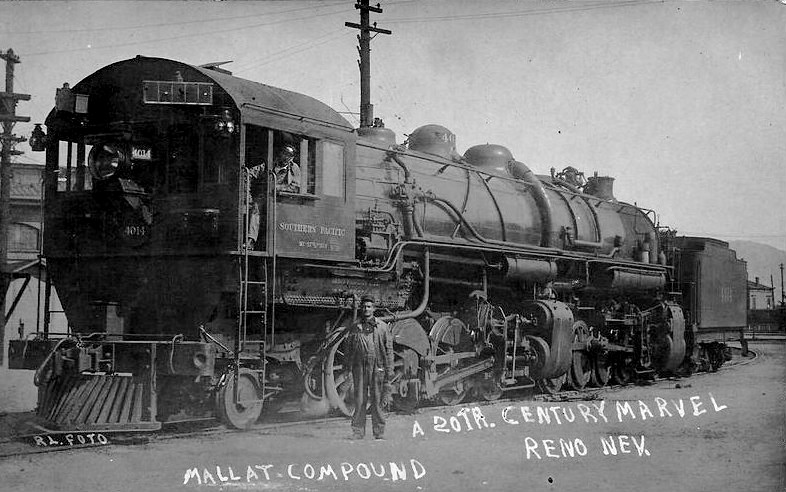
Mallet compound locomotive, Southern Pacific Railroad

The best known example of the cab-forward design in the United States, the Southern Pacific cab-forwards (also known to a lesser extent as cab-in-fronts and cab-aheads) placed the cab at the front by essentially turning the locomotive, minus the tender, around, and rearranging the controls for the operators to face away from the boiler. This arrangement was made possible by burning fuel oil instead of coal.

The cab-forward design was widely used by the Southern Pacific Railroad. The design was able to deal with the peculiar problems of its routes. The 39 long tunnels and nearly 40 miles (64 km) of snow sheds of the Sierra Nevada could funnel dangerous exhaust fumes back into the crew compartment of a conventional locomotive. After a number of crews nearly asphyxiated, they began running conventional locomotives in reverse to keep the fumes behind the crew. This meant that the tender was now leading the train, which introduced new problems. The tender blocked the view ahead and put crewmen on the wrong sides of the cab for seeing signals. The tenders were not designed to be pushed at the lead of the train, which limited speeds. Southern Pacific commissioned Baldwin Locomotive Works to build a prototype cab-forward locomotive, then ordered more units before the prototype had even arrived.

All of the cab-forwards were oil-burning locomotives, which meant there was little trouble involved putting the tender at what would normally be the front of the locomotive. The oil and water tanks were pressurized so that both would flow normally even on uphill grades. Visibility from the cab was superb, such that one crewman could easily survey both sides of the track. There were concerns about what would happen to the crew in the event of a collision, and at least one fatal accident occurred on the Modoc Line in Herlong, California when a moving locomotive struck a flat car. Turning the normal locomotive arrangement around also placed the crew well ahead of the exhaust fumes, insulating them from that hazard. One problematic aspect of the design, however, was the routing of the oil lines; because the firebox was located ahead of the driving wheels (instead of behind them, the usual practice), an oil leak could land ahead of the wheels and cause them to slip. A nuisance under most conditions, it resulted in at least one fatal accident. This occurred in 1941 when a cab-forward with leaking steam entered the tunnel at Santa Susana Pass, near Los Angeles. The tunnel was on a grade, and as the slow-moving train ascended the tunnel, water on the rails from a leaking cylinder cock caused the wheels to slip and spin. The train slipped backward and a coupler knuckle broke, separating the air line, causing an emergency brake application and stalling the train in a tunnel that was rapidly filling with exhaust fumes and steam. The oil dripping on the ties then ignited beneath the cab, killing the crew.

No other North American railroad ordered full-scale production of cab-forward locomotives, although some, like Western Pacific, did consider the type. Built to deal with difficult terrain, these locomotives became an easily recognizable symbol of the Southern Pacific. In total 256 such Mallet-type articulated locomotives, in three different wheel arrangements, were placed on SP's roster. One example of the type, Southern Pacific 4294, is kept at the California State Railroad Museum in Sacramento, California. It is a 4-8-8-2 locomotive and is the only one of SP's cab-forwards that has not been scrapped. It was also SP's last new steam locomotive, built in 1944.

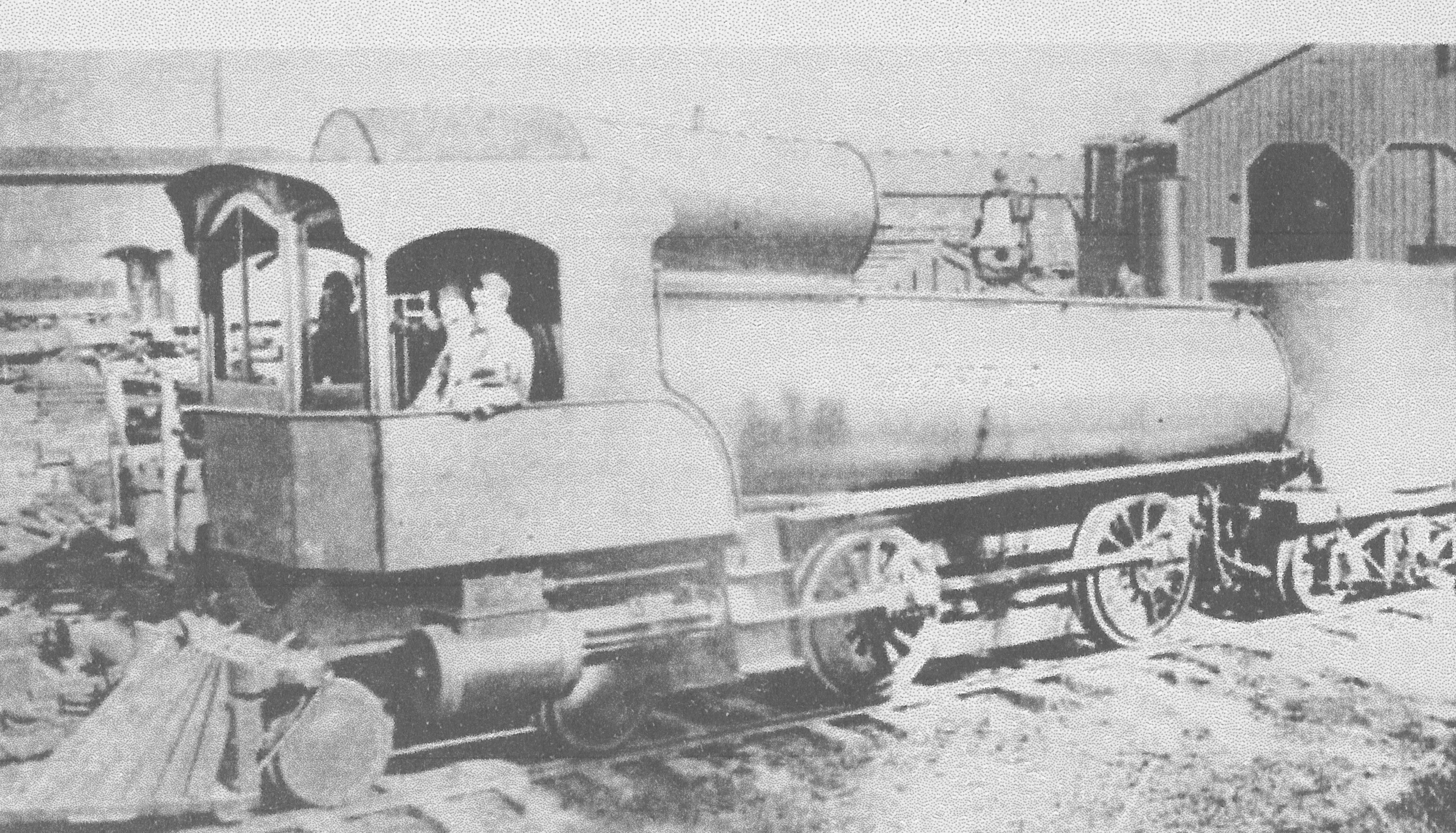
North Pacific Coast locomotive 21, an early cab-forward experiment

A decade before SP's first cab-forward, the North Pacific Coast Railroad, later part of the SP-owned Northwestern Pacific company, rebuilt an 1875 4-4-0 into an oil-fired cab-forward locomotive. This innovative engine was built by William (Bill) Thomas, the NPC master mechanic who was nationally known and holder of a number of patents. Thomas used the running gear and frame from NPC locomotive 5, the "Bodega", which had been wrecked in 1897, to build NPC 21. With the addition a new and unusual marine water tube boiler and an all-steel cab, installed in reverse order from standard engines, this unique creation earned Thomas a patent on the locomotive design. No. 21 entered service in 1900, but only lasted a few years. Although it reportedly steamed well, though with a sooty exhaust, the crews found it difficult to operate, and with fears of the possible results of a collision they dubbed it "The Freak". A negligent fireman allowed the water level to drop, damaging the boiler, and it was not repaired.

Both the Chesapeake and Ohio class M-1 and Norfolk and Western 2300 were experimental steam turbine locomotives that used a cab-forward arrangement. These highly unusual engines both placed their cabs in front of the boiler, and a coal bunker was then in front of the cab, while their tenders were purely for water.

=== Proposed, never built ===
L.D. Porta proposed a 2-10-0 cab-forward, triple expansion, modern steam locomotive for fast-freight work for the ACE 3000 project.

=== Prussia ===
Experimental Prussian T 16 (see in German) 2'C2' (4-6-4T) had control cabs at both ends.

=== UK: Southern Railway ===
Oliver Bulleid's ill-fated Leader is sometimes referred to as a cab-forward locomotive, but since it had a cab at each end like a typical modern diesel or electric locomotive, this designation is not entirely appropriate.

== Road transport ==
=== Automobiles ===
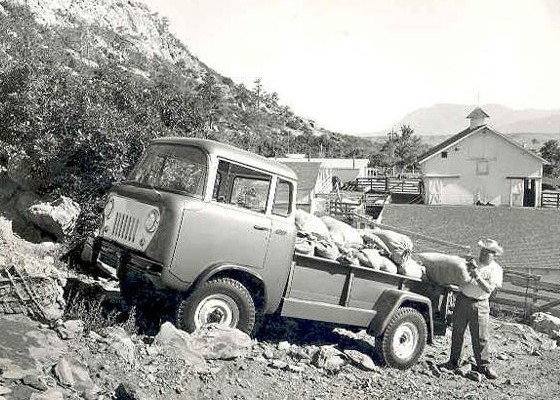
1957 Kaiser Jeep model FC-170

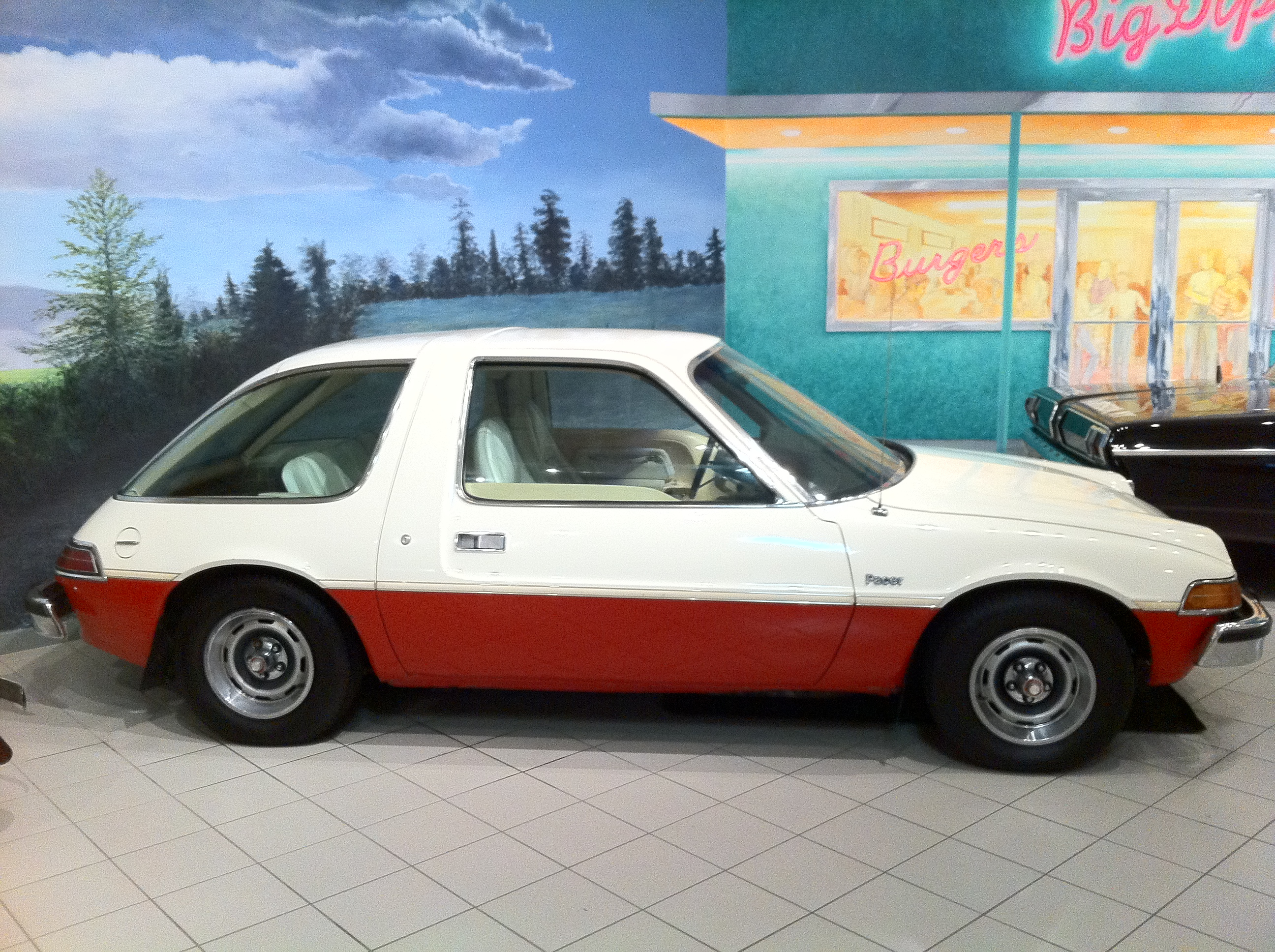
The AMC Pacer's forward placement of the passenger compartment

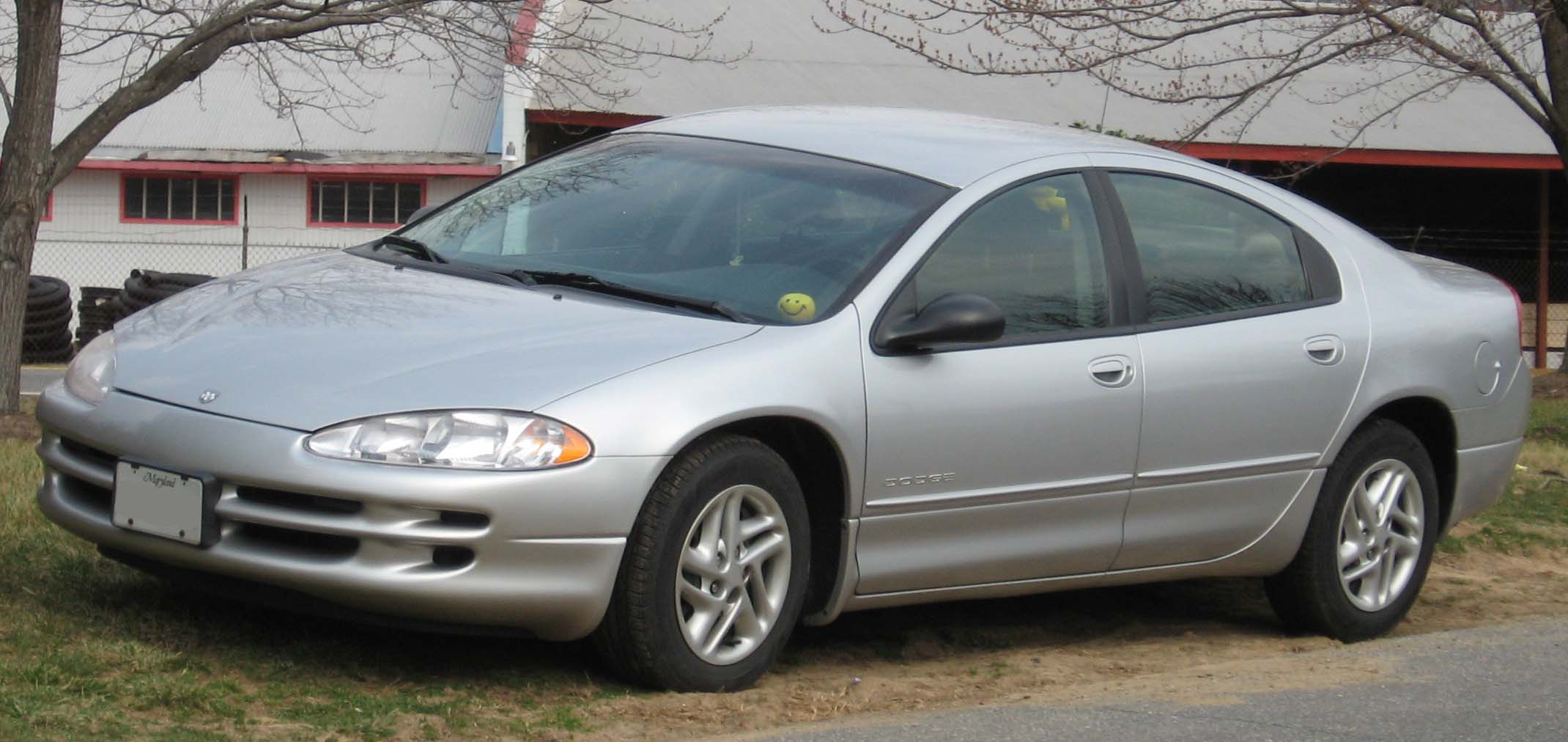
The Dodge Intrepid is one of the best known examples of cab-forward design in automobiles

The cab-forward design allows the passenger volume to be larger than in other similar sized automobiles.

The first modern mass-produced U.S. automobile using the cab-forward concept was the Pacer, introduced in 1975 by American Motors Corporation (AMC). The company did not call it cab-forward, but the Pacer's layout placed the passenger compartment farther forward than was typical to that time. Its A-pillars were moved forward and the windshield was placed over part of the engine compartment. The Pacer's "wide track and cab forward design actually lets it handle pretty well" given its body roll like competing contemporary models.

Cab forward was used by Chrysler Corporation starting in 1992, the first for a full-sized car, to describe styling and engineering features that were similar to those seen on the AMC Pacer and the Lamborghini Portofino, which improved cornering and interior space. The passenger cabin was forward, relative to typical designs, so that the front wheel well directly abutted the leading edge of the front doors, and the windshield extended forward over the engine, while the rear wheels were shifted towards the back corners of the vehicle. Moving the wheels to the edges allowed designers to enlarge the interior while improving ride and cornering.

Numerous models built from 1993 to 2004 on the Chrysler LH platform, the JA and JR platforms ("cloud cars"), and the PL platform (Neon), were specifically marketed as cab-forward cars. Chrysler claimed to be the first to apply these features to a full-size car. Likewise, the Dodge Stratus and Chrysler Cirrus have a hood that is wider than it is long because engineers established a goal of packing the engine and everything else that is located ahead of the passenger compartment into a much smaller space and then the designers developed the car's outer body to offer more interior roominess than competing models in their size class.

In 2023, Telo Trucks unveiled the Telo MT1, an electric pickup truck with a compact, cab forward design. Unlike some larger commercial vehicles and some smaller Japanese kei trucks, the MT1 eschews a cab over axle design for increased space in the passenger cabin.

=== Commercial vehicles ===
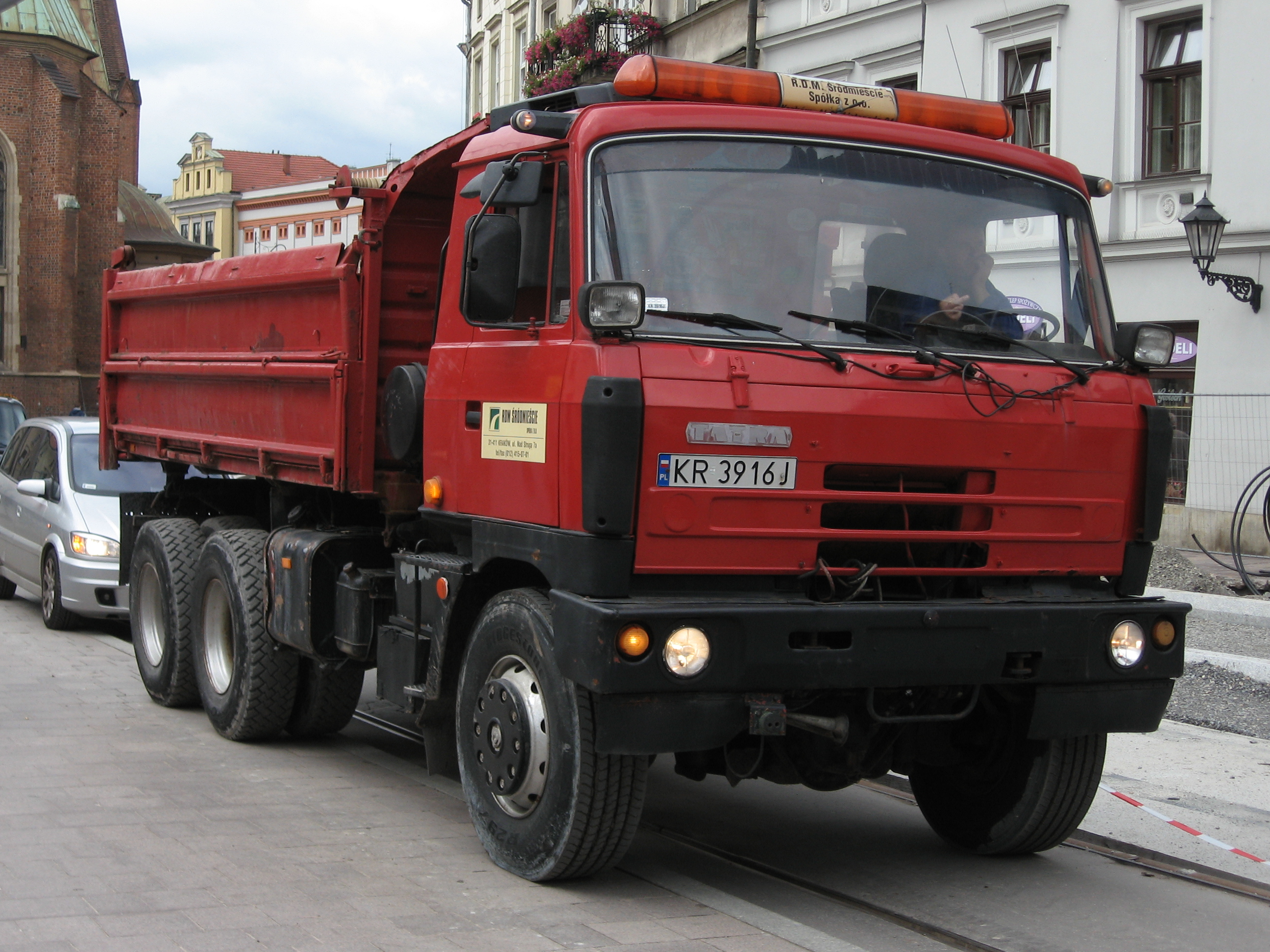
Tatra 815 version with low cab, situated in front of the engine

In road vehicle design, cab-forward, also known as cab-over, COE (Cab Over Engine), or forward control, is a body style of truck, bus, or van that has a vertical front or flat face, with the cab sitting above the front axle. This body design allows for a more compact configuration. For example, the Jeep Forward Control model was the first time the payload (or pickup box) had a record-breaking 74 in (1,880 mm) length (with the tailgate up) on an 81 in (2,057 mm) wheelbase as well as the first time offering a model where a 9-foot (274 cm) box exceeded the wheelbase of a truck.

The cab-forward truck configuration is currently common among European and Japanese truck manufacturers, because the laws governing overall vehicle lengths are strict and the body style allows longer trailers or a longer cargo area for the same overall length than a standard truck (with an engine compartment ahead of a conventional cabin). Better visibility and maneuverability in tight quarters, such as for city delivery, are benefits of locating the truck's cab up front. Large trucks of this type are most often described as cab over engine (COE) or cab over models.
