= Telo MT1 =

Battery electric pickup truck

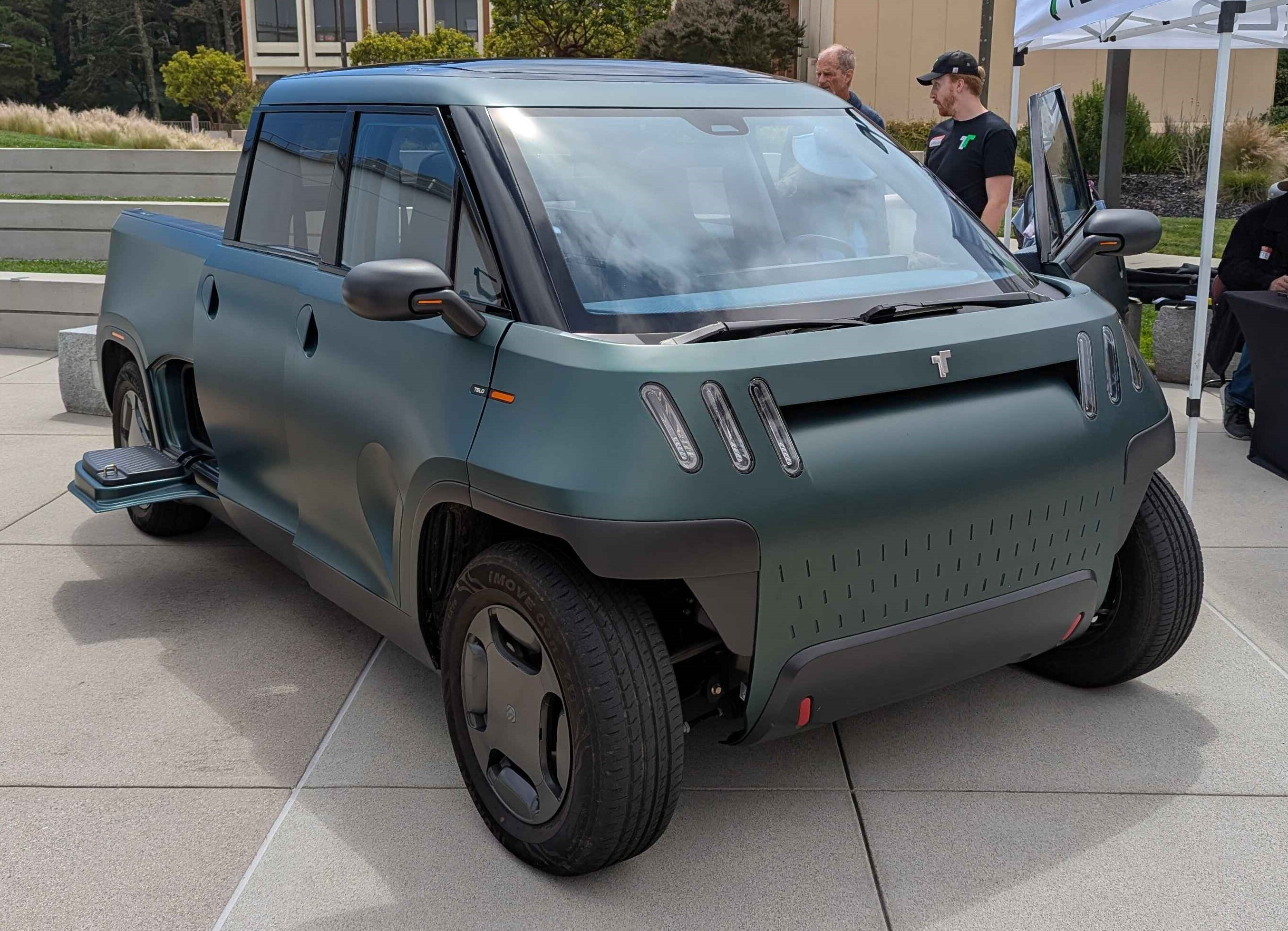
- The 2nd prototype Telo MT1 on display in San Bruno, California in April 2026.

Overview
- Manufacturer: Telo Trucks
- Production: Expected in Q4 2026
- Designer: Yves Béhar

Body and chassis
- Class: Mini truck
- Body style: 4-door pickup truck
- Layout: Rear-motor, rear-wheel-drive; Dual-motor, all-wheel-drive

Powertrain
- Power output: 300 hp (224 kW), RWD; 500 hp (373 kW), AWD
- Battery: 77 or 106 kWh Li-ion pack
- Range: 260 or 350 miles (418 or 563 km) (est. EPA range)
- Plug-in charging: DC: 400 kW, 400/800 V (NACS connector)

Dimensions
- Wheelbase: 111 in (2,819 mm)
- Length: 152 in (3,861 mm)
- Width: 73 in (1,854 mm)
- Height: 67 in (1,702 mm)
- Curb weight: 4,400 lb (2,000 kg)

The Telo MT1 is an upcoming 4-door battery-electric mini truck designed by Telo Trucks, with low volume production expected to start in late 2026.

== Overview ==
The Telo MT1 is an 5-passenger electric pickup truck designed to be as compact as possible while still offering the performance and capacity of a mid-sized pickup. First revealed in 2023, the overall length of the MT1 is 152 inches (3,861 mm), which is shorter than the 2026 two-door Mini Cooper while having the same interior space and bed length as a Toyota Tacoma.

The starting price is estimated as $41,520 for the 260-mile (418 km) model and $45,500 for the 350-mile (563 km) model. Adding all-wheel drive will increase the long-range trim's price to $50,000, with additional options such as a solar cab roof and solar camper shell being available in partnership with Aptera Motors.

The first 500 MT1 vehicles will be produced in the US by a contract manufacturer using a bay-build process, to cut down on capital requirements and allow a faster path to production. Body panels for the first 5000 vehicles will be stamped using tooling made from a low-cost alloy designed for low volume production. Telo Trucks predicts it can hit unit profitability after delivering 6000 vehicles.

== Design ==
=== Size ===
First revealed in 2023, co-founder and CEO Jason Marks stated that the motivation for the Telo MT1 was to create a practical truck that was easier to park in cities like San Francisco than his Toyota Tacoma pickup.

A notable space-saving feature of the MT1 is its cab forward design, with the nose of the truck ending a short distance in front of the wheels. Despite not having a conventional hood, the truck is designed with a 14 in (360 mm) crumple zone, more than what is required to pass FMVSS 208.

=== Styling ===
The design of the Telo MT1 was led by Telo's chief creative officer Yves Béhar and his Fuseproject design office. It features capsule-shaped motifs throughout the vehicle and sustainable interior materials, including a cork-based composite and Mizmaze fabric. It will be built with a glass roof, which CEO Jason Marks said will reduce manufacturing costs and enable greater headroom while improving the sense of space inside the MT1.

=== Cargo and passenger space ===
The MT1 bed is 60 in (1,520 mm) long, and a drop-down midgate allows for objects 96 in × 48 in × 18 in (2,440 mm × 1,220 mm × 460 mm) to be stored between the wheel wells with the tailgate up, such as 4 × 8 ft sheets of plywood. Above the wheel wells, the bed width is 56 in (1,420 mm). Despite the MT1 being smaller than the Ford Maverick and the Rivian R1T, the MT1's bed is longer than those of both trucks. Outlets in the bed will be capable of delivering a total of 9.6 kW at 120V and 240V to power equipment and accessories.

To increase foot room for passengers in the back seats, the front seat supports will have a mono post design. The rear three seats will fold down with the midgate to allow longer cargo to fit in the bed. A pass-through storage tunnel extends from the left side of the truck to the right side under the bed, similar in function and location to the gear tunnel on the Rivian R1T with the addition of access from the bed. A third row of seats can be fitted to the bed, using the storage tunnel as a footwell.

The MT1 will have a payload capacity of 2,000 lb (907 kg) with the single motor option, with the all-wheel-drive, dual-motor configuration reducing the payload to 1,700 lb (771 kg). All versions will have 8,000 lb (3,629 kg) of towing capacity. For comparison, the most popular trim of the 2025 Toyota Tacoma (the SR5 double cab all-wheel-drive with 60-inch bed) has a payload capacity of 1,505 lb (683 kg) and a towing capacity of 6,400 lb (2,903 kg). The MT1 is also designed to have a 10-inch (254 mm) ground clearance and an approach angle of 87 degrees.

=== Powertrain ===
The standard high voltage traction battery pack will have a capacity of 77 kWh and an optional 106-kWh battery will be available, giving an estimated range of 260 or 350 mi (420 or 560 km), respectively. The MT1 will be able to charge at both 400 V and 800 V, at a peak power of 400 kW. The battery pack is a structural member designed by Telo using 21700-size cells, connected by integrated wiring, with an overall pack height of 4 inches (102 mm). The battery is estimated to take 20 minutes to charge from 20 to 80% at a charging power of 250 kW and will be designed to use the NACS connector. The MT1 will also have Vehicle to Home charging capability. The MT1 will not be offered with a range extender, which Telo claims is to maximize storage space and packaging efficiency while minimizing costs.

The MT1 also will have two power options: 300 hp (224 kW) from a single motor, rear-wheel-drive drivetrain, and 500 hp (373 kW) from a dual motor, all-wheel-drive drivetrain. The RWD version is claimed to accelerate from 0–60 mph (97 km/h) in 6.0 seconds, while the AWD version decreases the 0–60 mph (97 km/h) time to 4.0 seconds.

=== Chassis ===
The chassis will be made out of steel, aluminum, and carbon fiber, with carbon fiber used in parts of the vehicle where space is the most constrained. Unlike the Tesla Cybertruck which uses an aluminum casting for its tow hitch, the Telo MT1 hitch is designed with steel for increased durability, with a continuous steel load path from the strut tower pivot point to the hitch pivot point.

To reduce corrosion risks, aluminum frame elements feature a surface conversion coating and the tow hitch will be E-coated. There will likely be a polyolefin plastic sheet between the hitch and the chassis to ensure no contact is available for galvanic corrosion to occur. Glass reinforced epoxy will be used to bond permanently attached steel parts to the chassis.

=== Electronics ===
Co-founder and CTO Forrest North confirmed that the MT1 will have Android Auto and Apple CarPlay support. The truck has an off-the-shelf infotainment ECU with an open-source architecture, and will come with physical buttons for certain commonly-used functions like climate control. The MT1 will also come with front, side, and rear cameras with bird's-eye-view for improved awareness, and will have SAE Level 1 ADAS features (lane keeping assist, adaptive cruise control, emergency brake assist, parking assist).

Telo MT1 prototype

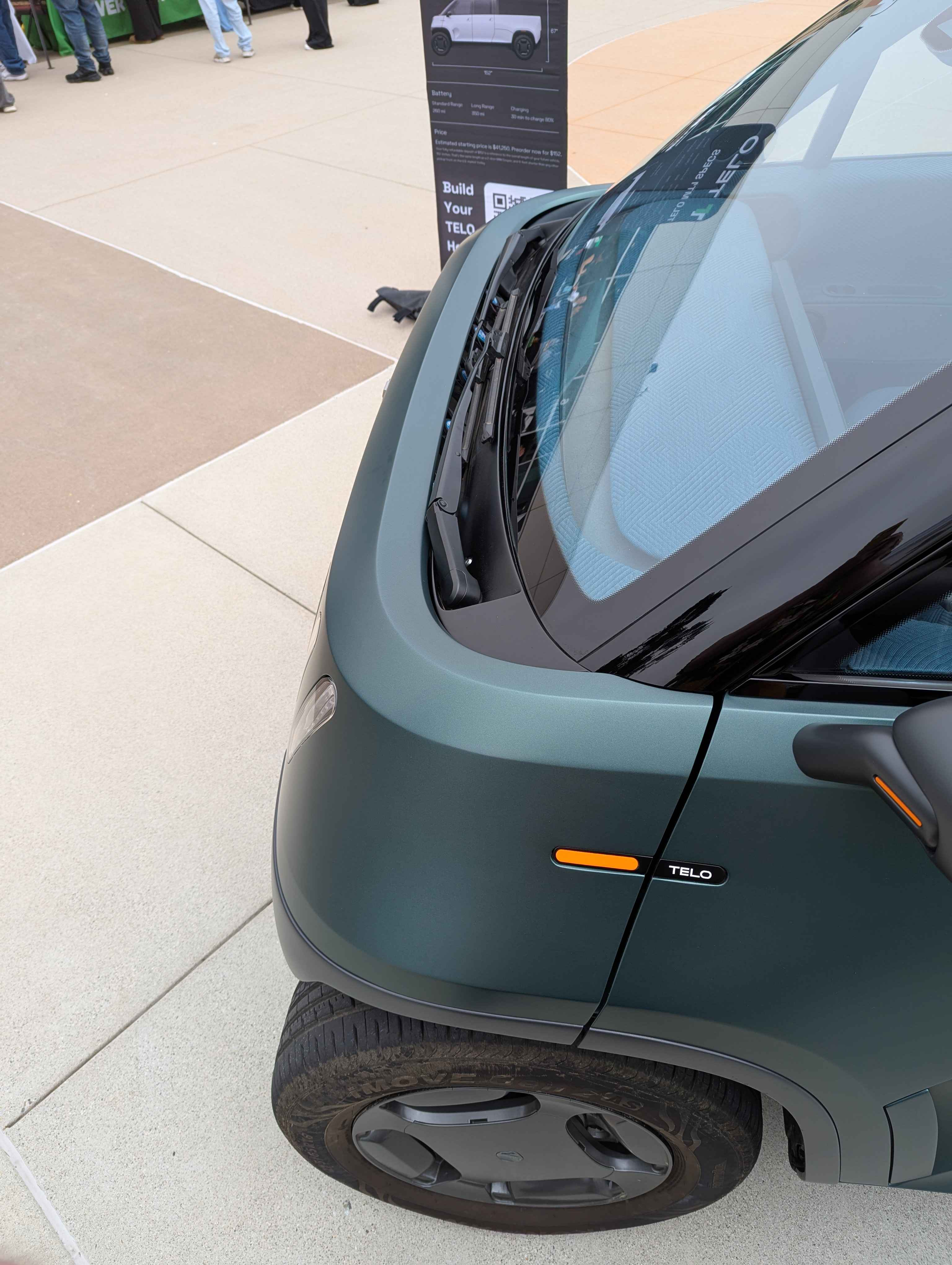
Front view showing minimal overhang

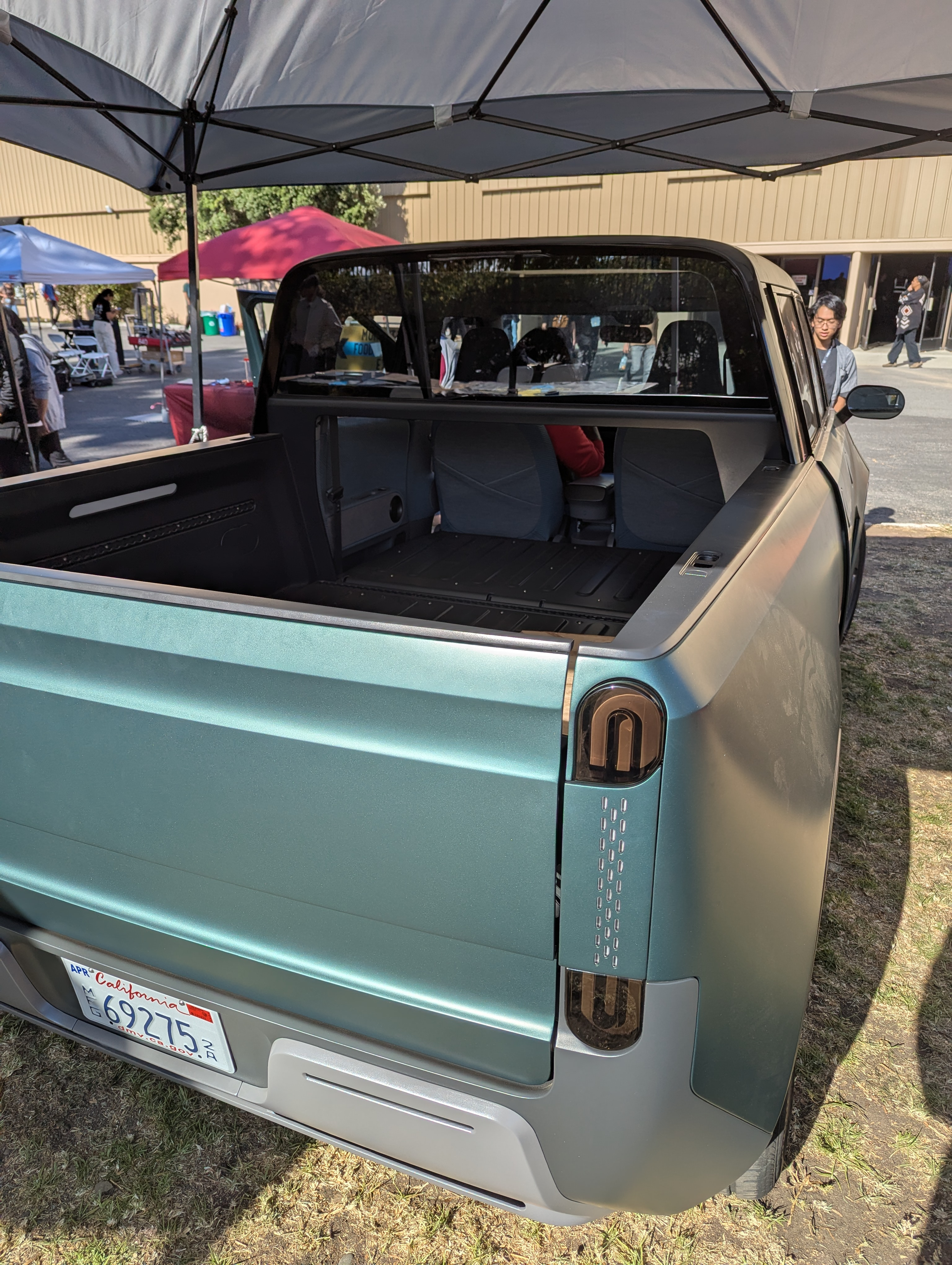
Rear view with midgate folded down

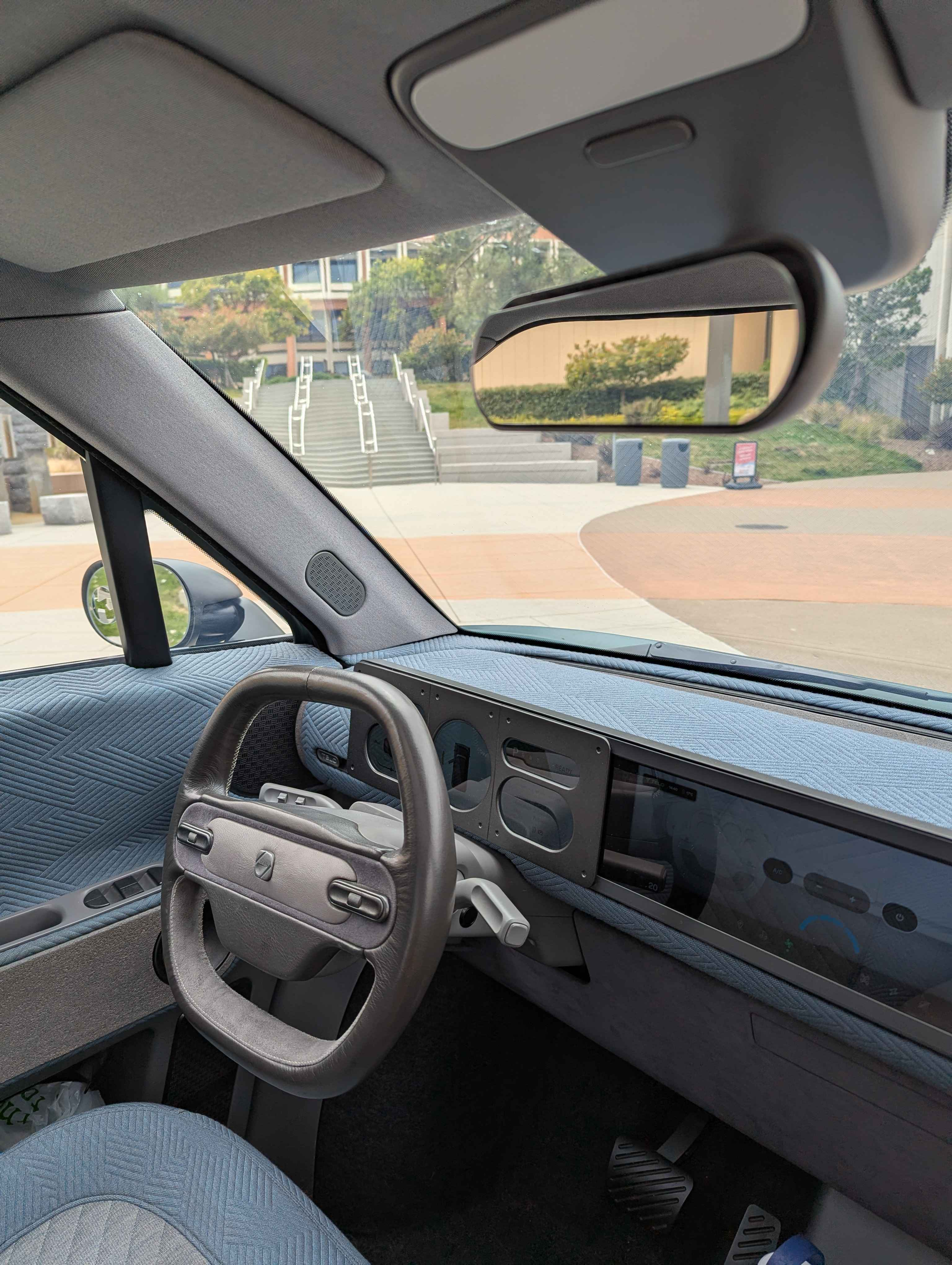
Interior view

== Reactions ==
The Telo MT1 received mostly positive impressions from people who previewed the vehicle. In March 2025, several YouTubers visited a ranch where the first prototype was displayed. One of them, JerryRigEverything, highlighted the repairability benefits of using off-the-shelf components and described the vehicle as "the coolest looking truck." In May, Doug DeMuro scored the vehicle well for its "shocking practicality" while noting the fit and finish, noise, and quality of the first prototype wasn't on par with mainstream brands. Both reviewers believed that the biggest challenge for the Telo MT1 would be making it to production at the advertised price point.

In April, Jay Leno drove the Telo MT1 on Jay Leno's Garage, where he described it as having "big truck energy". He noted issues with the mirror sight lines and steering wheel placement of the first prototype, but said "the real selling point is the packaging" and how much can be carried by the truck. In August, Sandy Munro visited Telo's headquarters and described the truck as "a winner" for its engineering innovations and capability.

The unique appearance of the truck has been described as "friendlier-looking than a typical truck with a hulking grille" and the vehicular equivalent of "a snub-nosed pug." After driving the first MT1 prototype, Motor Trend suggested that the interior should be offered with non-absorbent, hard-wearing materials for work use, and that the glass roof should be replaced with a solid one to reduce complexity and heat load in the cabin. They also noted that the driving dynamics of the prototype needed refining, and that it suffered from excessive wind and road noise, but said that the truck showed promise.

As of September 2025, Telo Trucks claimed to have received over 12000 reservations, each with a deposit of $152 (referring to the length of the vehicle in inches). They reported raising $20 million in an oversubscribed Series A round.
