= FS Class 670 =

Class of 43 Italian cab-forward 4-6-0 locomotives

RA Class 500 FS Class 670
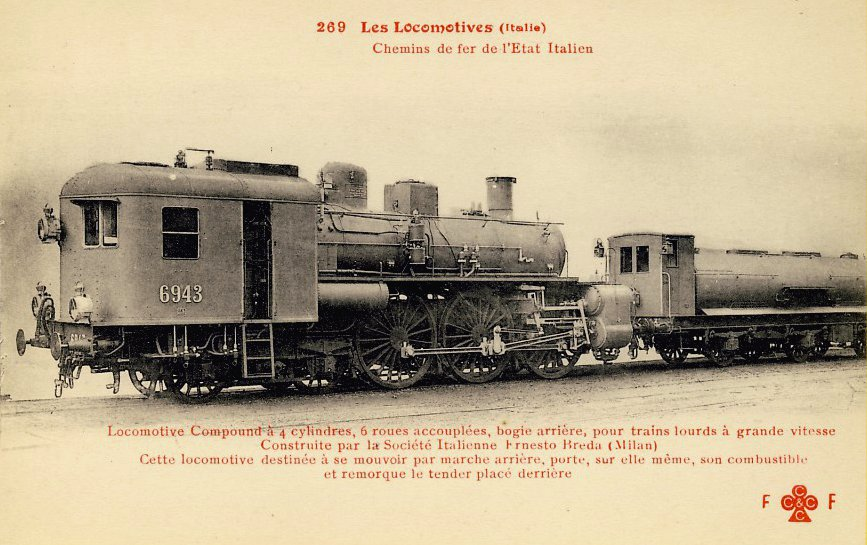
- FS locomotive 670.043, here with the pre-1907 classification of FS 6943
Type and origin
- Power type: Steam
- Builder: RA Florence Works (1); Ernesto Breda (30), Borsig-Werke (12)
- Build date: 1900–1906
- Total produced: 43
Specifications
- Configuration
  - Whyte: 4-6-0
  - UIC: 2′C n4v
- Gauge: 1,435 mm (4 ft 8 1/2 in) standard gauge
- Leading dia.: 1,125 mm (3 ft 8 1/4 in)
- Driver dia.: 1,920 mm (6 ft 3 5/8 in)
- Length: 13,687 mm (44 ft 10 7/8 in)
- Axle load: 14.4 tonnes (14.2 long tons; 15.9 short tons)
- Loco weight: 69.9 tonnes (68.8 long tons; 77.1 short tons)
- Tender weight: 37.2 tonnes (36.6 long tons; 41.0 short tons)
- Fuel type: Coal
- Fuel capacity: 4,000 kg (8,800 lb)
- Water cap.: 2,000 litres (440 imp gal; 530 US gal)
- Firebox
  - Grate area: 3.0 m^{2} (32 sq ft)
- Boiler pressure: 14 kg/cm^{2} (13.7 bar; 199 psi)
- Heating surface: 150.8 m^{2} (1,623 sq ft)
- Cylinders: Four (compound)
- High-pressure cylinder: 360 mm × 650 mm (14 3/16 in × 25 9/16 in)
- Low-pressure cylinder: 490 mm × 650 mm (19 5/16 in × 25 9/16 in)
- Valve gear: Walschaerts
Performance figures
- Maximum speed: 110 km/h (68 mph)
- Power output: 870 CV (640 kW; 858 hp)
- Tractive effort: 8,000 kgf (78.5 kN; 17,600 lbf)
Career
- Operators: Rete Adriatica; Ferrovie dello Stato
- Numbers: RA: 5001–5031; FS 1905–07: 6901–6943; FS 1907–18: 6701–6743; FS 1918–: 670.001–670.043

The Rete Adriatica Class 500 (Italian: Gruppo 500), classified after 1905 in the Ferrovie dello Stato Italiane (FS; Italian State Railways) as Class 670 (Italian: Gruppo 670) was an unorthodox and iconic cab forward 4-6-0 (2′C) steam locomotive.

== Design and construction ==
The Class 670 was designed by Eng. Giuseppe Zara of the Rete Adriatica (one of the two major railway companies in Italy at the beginning of the twentieth century); its design was very unorthodox, as the boiler was reversed on the frames, so that the cab and the firebox were leading and supported by the bogie, while the cylinders were at the rear. The compound arrangement was also highly peculiar, as it was the first experiment with the Plancher compound engine: this arrangement meant that there were four cylinders, in which the two high pressure (HP) ones and the two low pressure (LP) ones were paired together respectively on the left-hand and the right-hand side of the boiler, and each pair was served by a single piston valve through a crossed-port arrangement. While simplifying the valve gear, this feature made it difficult to equalize the work done by each pair of cylinders, and this provoked hunting.

The locomotive also had a peculiar arrangement for its tender; the coal was kept near the cab on the left side of the locomotive, while a tender carried either 15,000 or 20,000 litres (3,300 or 4,400 imp gal; 4,000 or 5,300 US gal) of water, depending on the series.

The first locomotive, initially classified as RA 3701 (later changed to RA 500), was taken to France and subjected to trials with a dynamometer car loaned by the Chemin de Fer de l'Ouest, which were successful. As a result, the other forty-two were built by Ernesto Breda and the German firm Borsig-Werke.

When in 1905 the railways in Italy were nationalised, the Ferrovie dello Stato initially reclassified the locomotives as Class 690 (FS 69XX), but were ultimately classified as Class 670.

== Operations ==
Nicknamed Mucca (Italian for "cow"), the Class 670 spent its career on the mainline railways of the Po Valley; while quite fast and powerful for its day, the unorthodox shape of the locomotive in the end didn't prove successful, with more orthodox designs (like the FS Class 680) eventually being built. Withdrawals of both the Class 670 and Class 671 locomotives began in the 1930s, and by the end of the decade all the locomotives had been taken out of service; none survived into preservation.

== Variants and experiments ==
=== Class 671 ===
Between 1919 and 1930 29 Class 670 locomotives were rebuilt with a superheater, and were classified as Class 671.

=== Franco-Crosti ===
In 1936 the locomotive 670.030 was rebuilt with a Franco-Crosti boiler. Articulated ducts carried the combustion gases from the main boiler to the preheater (placed on a standard bogie tender), and these passed to a chimney at the end of the tender. Exhaust steam from the cylinders similarly went through articulated ducts to the blastpipe at the rear of the tender, while articulated pipes connected the preheater and main boiler to take water and steam from one to the other. The whole locomotive-tender complex was given a streamlined casing. The locomotive was reclassified FS 672.001 and was subjected to trial runs, which showed a 22 per cent fuel saving compared to other Class 671 locomotives.

Although it paved the way to other, more successful conversions, this locomotive was only meant as a trial essay, and was quickly discarded.
