= Telo Trucks =

US electric vehicle startup

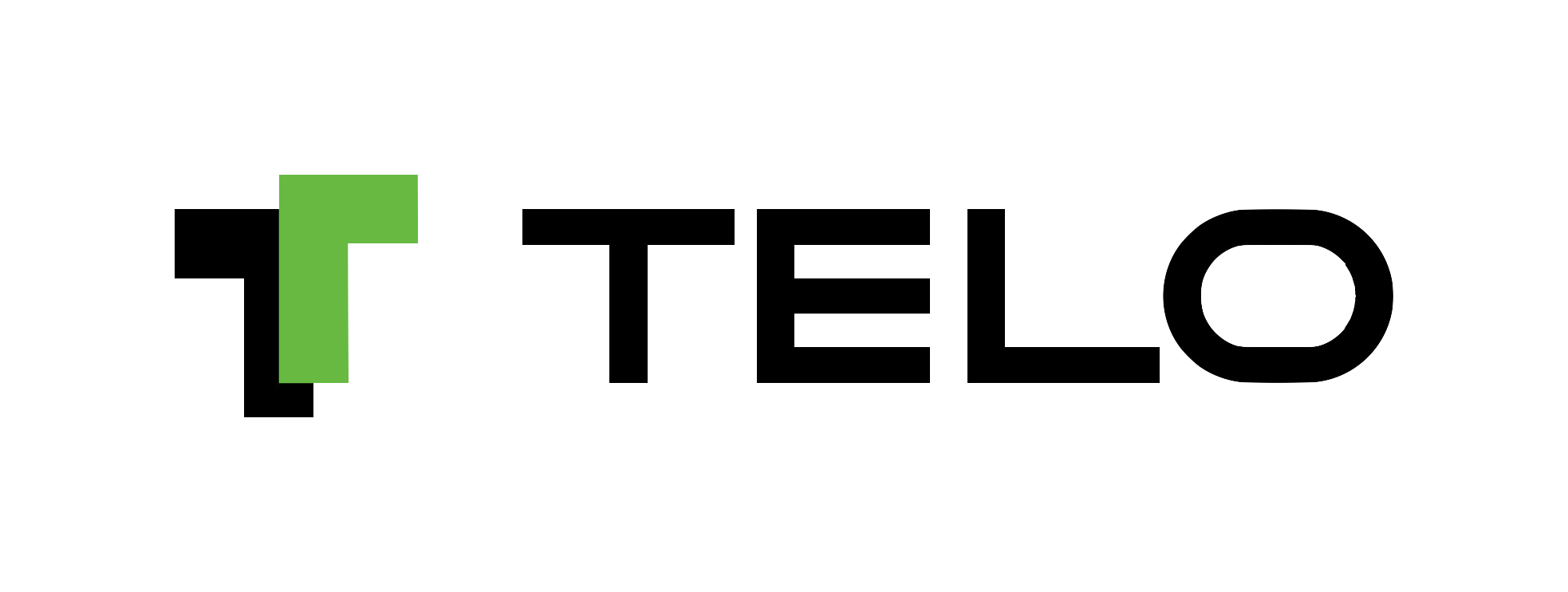
- Type: Private
- Industry: Automotive
- Founded: 2022; 4 years ago
- Founders: Jason Marks; Forrest North; Yves Béhar
- Headquarters: San Carlos, California, U.S.,
- Key people: Jason Marks (founder and CEO); Yves Béhar (CCO); Forrest North (CTO)
- Website: www.telotrucks.com

Telo Trucks (stylized as TELO, pronounced to rhyme with "hello") is a US-based electric vehicle startup.

== History ==
Telo Trucks was founded by Jason Marks, CEO, Forrest North, CTO, and Yves Behar as CCO, in 2022.

In 2025, Telo Trucks announced agreements with Aptera Motors for supply of integrated solar panel options for the Telo MT1. The solar panel integration will allow buyers to select up to three solar panel kits: a solar cab top, a solar tonneau bed cover, and a solar camper top.

== Vehicles ==
Telo Trucks' debut vehicle, the MT1 (Mini-Truck One), is projected to enter production in 2026. The MT1 is a purpose-built electric mini truck intending to combine the functionality of a mid-size pickup truck with practicality suited to urban environments. When achieving serial production, it will have the smallest footprint of any truck in the conventional US market.
