= BR Standard Class 9F 92020-9 =

British steam locomotive subclass

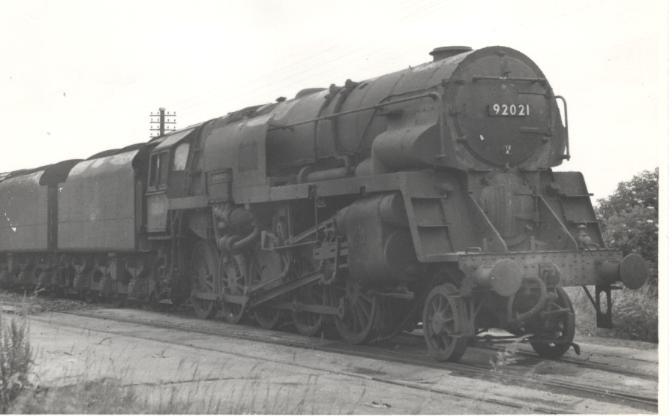
Crosti 9F 92021 at Wellingborough shed in 1959, showing the unique layout on the right hand side of the loco

British Railways Standard Class 9F steam locomotives Nos 92020-9 were experimentally built with Franco-Crosti boilers, thus forming a subclass. All ten were built in 1955 at Crewe Works.

== Design ==
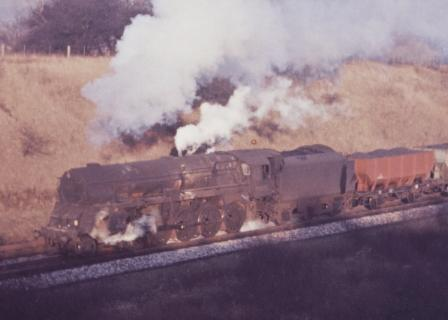
9F 92022 in 1964; the preheater drum had been sealed off in June 1962

The Franco-Crosti boiler took the form of a single cylindrical water drum running along the underside of the main boiler barrel. The standard chimney was still used for exhausting smoke from the fire box and was only used during lighting-up, in normal working the gases went through firetubes inside the preheater drum that led to a second smokebox situated beneath the boiler from which there emerged a chimney on the right-hand side (fireman's), just forward of the firebox. However where more power was needed steam would be sent to the Blast Pipe to draw more air through the firebox.

Limitations of the British loading gauge meant that the original BR9 boiler had to be reduced in diameter to allow for the preheater drum below it. This new BR9A, later BR12, boiler had a reduced heating surface compared to the original, even with the additional preheater. Without the preheater, there was over 1,000 square feet (93 m^{2}) less heating surface.

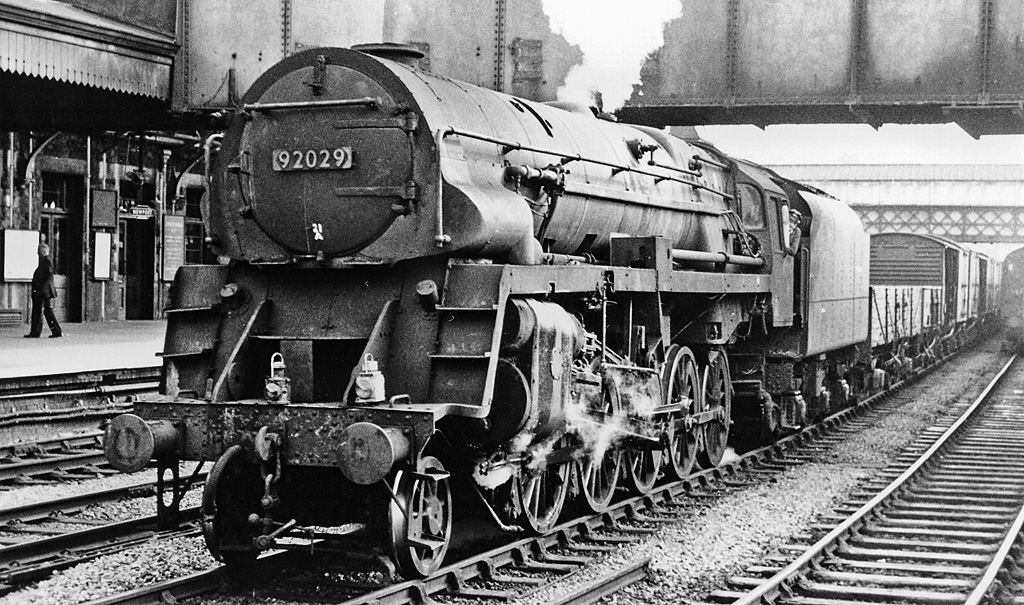
9F 92029 in 1964

In the event, the experiment did not deliver the hoped-for benefits, and efficiency was not increased sufficiently to justify the cost and complexity. The Crosti preheaters also proved to be a problem for maintenance, owing to acidic fluegases condensing in the feedwater heater and causing corrosion. Moreover, conditions were unpleasant on the footplate in a cross-wind, this in spite the later provision of a small deflector plate forward of the chimney. These problems led to the subsequent sealing off of the preheater drum, over the period 1959–1961, and the locomotives were then worked conventionally. As a result of this, there was a reduced ability to generate steam, and so their power classification was unofficially reduced from 9F to 8F.

All were fitted with the British Railways standard BR1B-type tenders which had a water capacity of 4,275 imperial gallons (19,430 L) and carried 7 long tons (7.1 t) of coal.

== Stock list ==
No.	Built	Converted to conventional	Withdrawn
92020	March 1955	1961	November 1967
92021	March 1955	1960	November 1967
92022	March 1955	1962	November 1967
92023	March 1955	1961	November 1967
92024	June 1955	1960	November 1967
92025	June 1955	1960	November 1967
92026	June 1955	1959	November 1967
92027	July 1955	1960	August 1967
92028	July 1955	1959	October 1966
92029	July 1955	1960	November 1967

== Withdrawal ==
No. 92028 was the first Franco-Crosti 9F to be withdrawn in October 1966, 92027 followed in August 1967, with the remainder being withdrawn en masse in November 1967. No examples of this class were preserved.

Year	No. Withdrawn	Nos
1966	1	92028
1967	9	92020–7/9
