= Franco-Crosti boiler =

Steam locomotive boiler

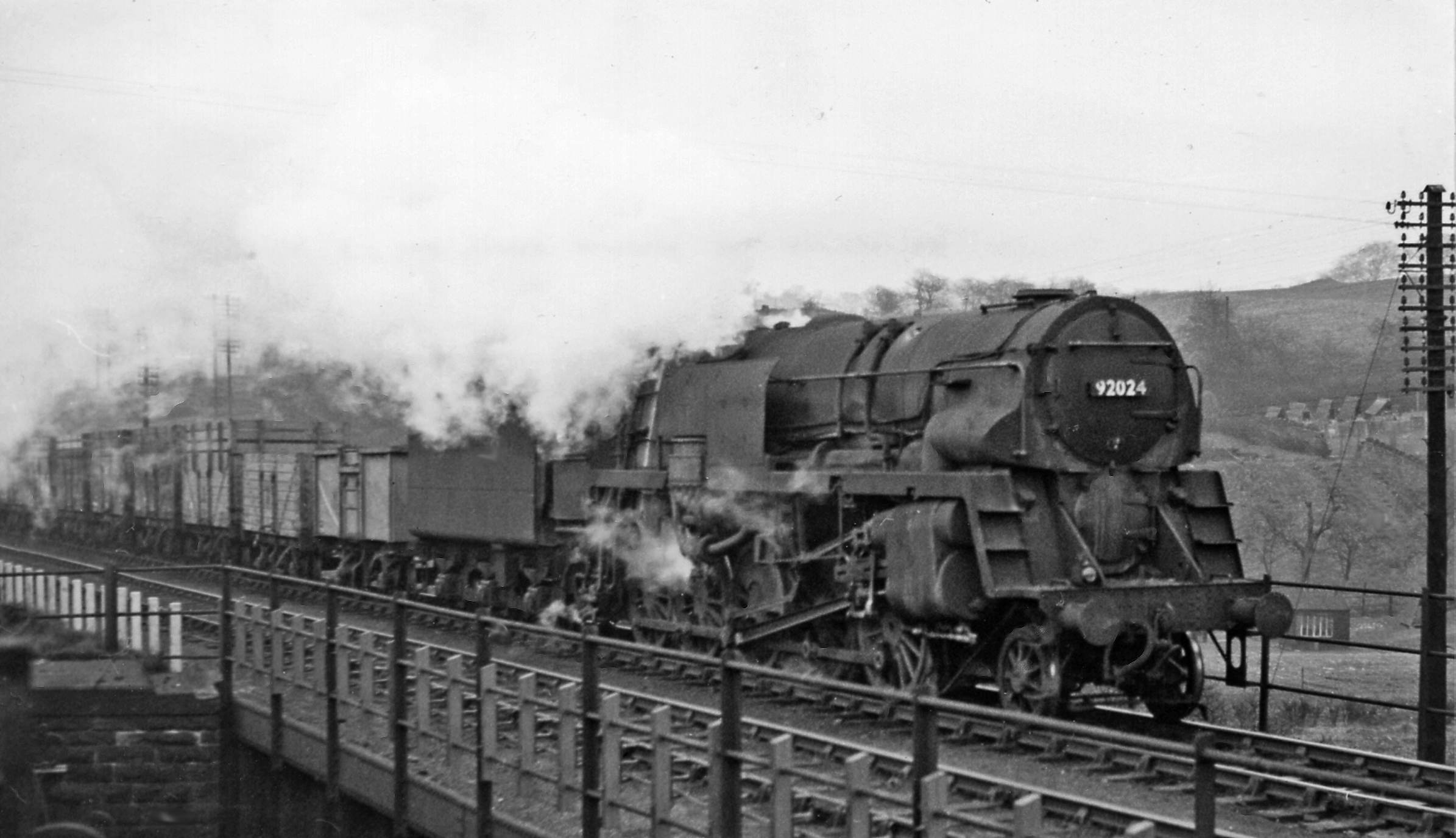
British 9F 92024 with Crosti boiler, showing secondary smokebox door and side-mounted chimney

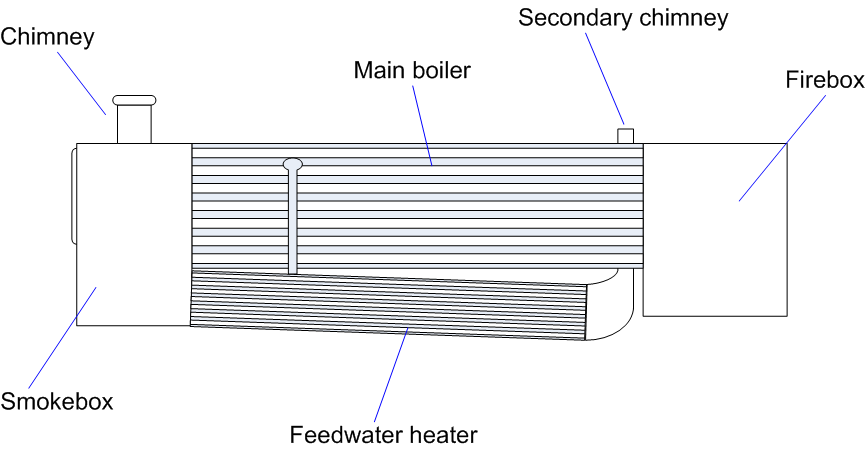
Schematic diagram of a Franco–Crosti boiler with single feedwater heater

The Franco–Crosti boiler is a type of boiler used for steam locomotives. It was designed in the 1930s by Attilio Franco and Dr Piero Crosti. The main difference between it and conventional feedwater heaters widely used on the continent is that the Franco-Crosti boiler uses both exhaust steam and exhaust gases from the firebox. Conventional feedwater heaters only use exhaust steam.

== Purpose ==
The Franco–Crosti boiler is a modification of the conventional fire tube boiler design used on most steam locomotives. Unlike conventional boilers the heat remaining in the exhaust gases is used to preheat the water supply for the main boiler using a secondary heat exchange mechanism. This mechanism, known as the feedwater heater is essentially a secondary boiler. The preheated feedwater is fed at full boiler pressure into the main boiler via clack valves.

The feedwater heater is not designed to produce steam, instead raising the temperature of the feedwater. This allows the heater to utilize the remaining energy in the exhaust gases effectively.

== Design ==
The typical configuration of a Franco–Crosti boiler had a relatively conventional main boiler with one or two secondary feedwater heaters running parallel to the boiler barrel. Where the loading gauge did not allow the feedwater heater to be placed beside the boiler it was mounted beneath.

When the locomotive is started, cold water is fed directly into the main boiler which operates normally with the exhaust gases flowing out of the main chimney via the smokebox. Once the boiler is producing steam, the exit from the smokebox into the main chimney is closed and the exhaust gases instead flow through the feedwater heater and exit via the secondary chimney located towards the rear of the locomotive. Water fed into the boiler is now pre-heated in the feedwater heater and enters the boiler at higher than normal temperature.

== History ==
=== Belgium ===
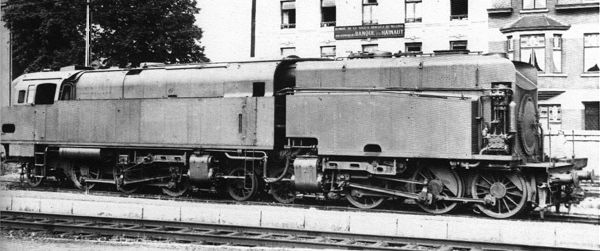

The first Franco-Crosti boilered locomotive was built for the Belgian State Railways as No. 2096 in 1932. This massive 0–6–2 + 2–4–2–4–2 + 2–6–0 locomotive weighed 248 tons and developed around 3,000 horsepower. It was essentially two Franco-Crosti boilered locomotives joined back-to-back and was one of the most powerful articulated locomotives ever built. The locomotive was known to be the largest steam locomotive in the entire world before the Union Pacific Big Boy.

During the German occupation of Belgium in the Second World War the locomotive was separated into two 0–6–2+2–6–2T locomotives. These locomotives were captured by invading Russian troops in 1945 and at least one of them was still in service in Poland in 1955.

=== Italy ===
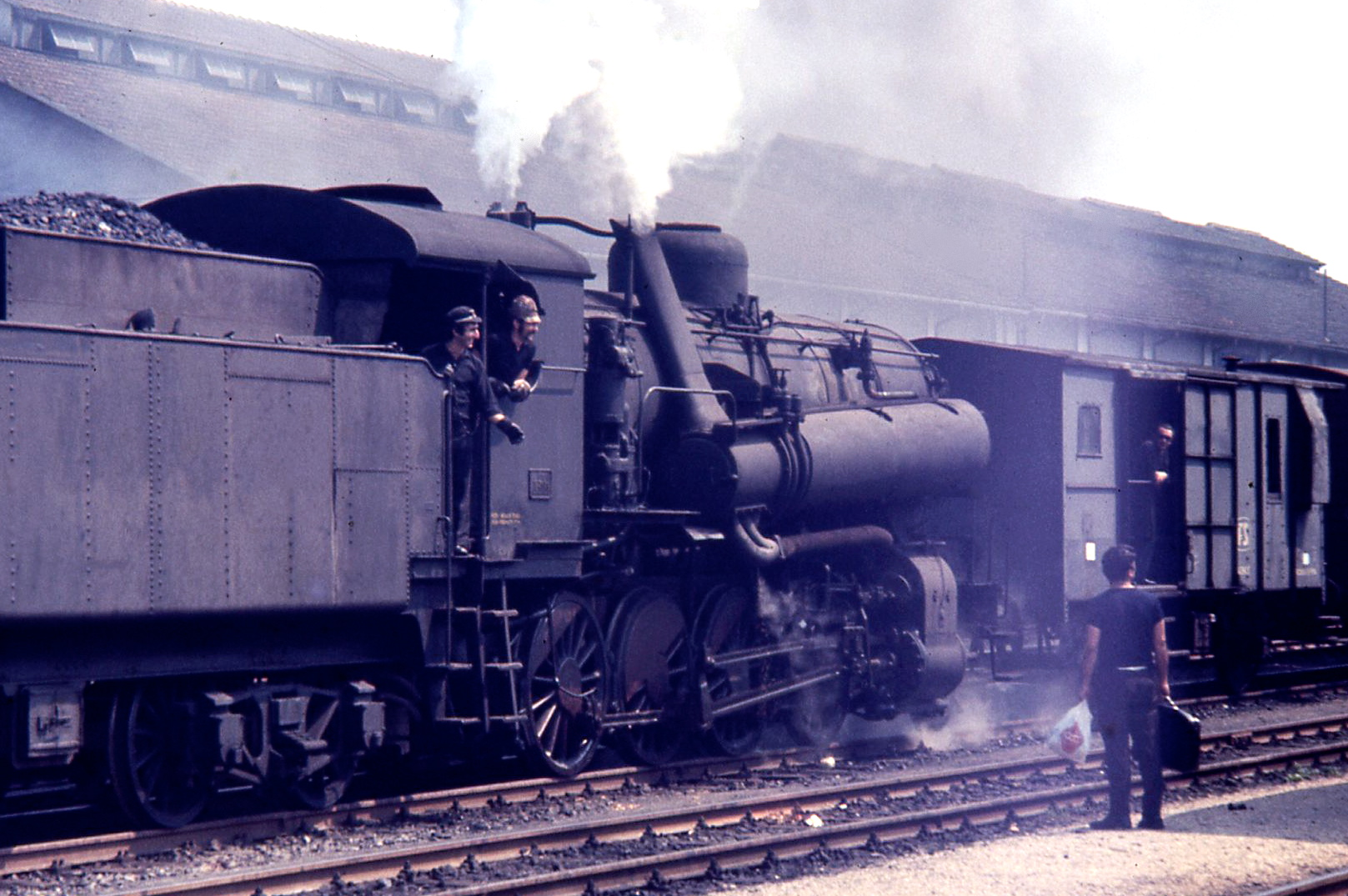
An FS (Italian Railways) class 743 at work at Cremona station, August 1973

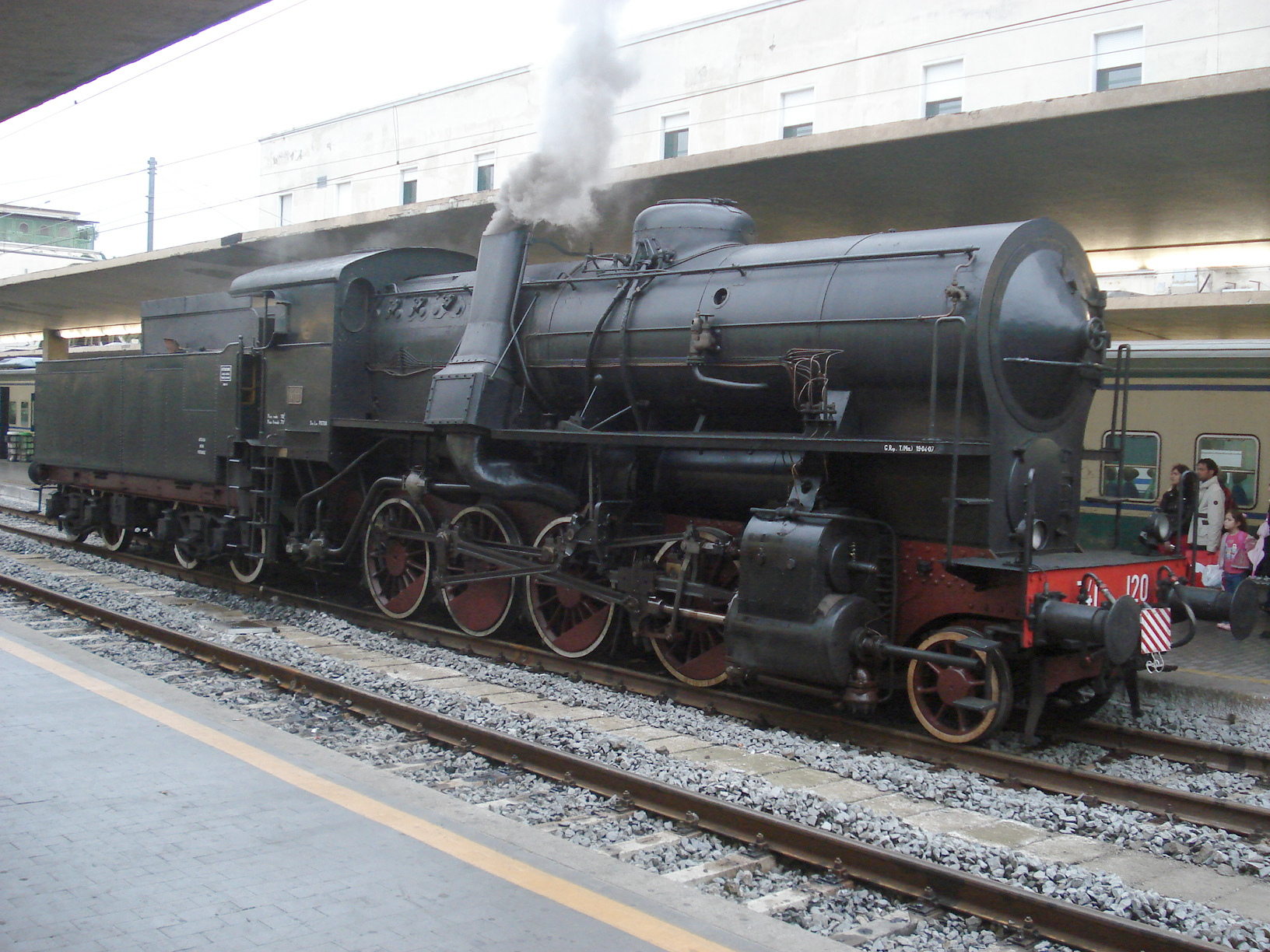
The FS steam locomotive 741.120 in Florence Central Station

The first Italian Franco–Crosti boilered locomotive was a modified Class 671 locomotive built for the Ferrovie dello Stato in 1939. This became the only member of the cab forward Class 672.

Following the experimental conversion of 672.001 a new class of Franco–Crosti boilered locomotives were built in 1940 and 1941. These were the Class 683, of which five were built as rebuilds of Class 685 locomotives. These were the first Franco–Crosti locomotives to also use Caprotti valve gear. These locomotives survived the war and continued in use until the last was withdrawn in 1962.

In 1940 the first of the Class 743 class were built. These were entirely new locomotives with two feedwater heaters, one on each side of the boiler. In all 94 of this class were built for FS.

In 1952 and 1953, 35 of the Class 625 locomotives were converted to use Franco–Crosti boilers with side feedwater heaters. These locomotives became the Class 623. Several survived into the 1970s.

Finally in 1954 the last Italian Franco–Crosti locomotives were built, the Class 741. Unlike the other Italian classes, these had a single feedwater heater mounted directly below the main boiler. In total 81 of these locomotives were built, again surviving into the 1970s.

Currently only a member of Class 741 is still operating: the 741.120. This locomotive is used only for heading historic trains. This Franco–Crosti steam locomotive is property of Trenitalia (the Italian national railways company) and assigned to D.R.S. Pistoia (Deposito Rotabili Storici di Pistoia, which means Historic Rolling Stock depot in Pistoia) near Florence – Italy and managed by the non-profit association "Italvapore" Associazione Toscana Treni Storici

=== West Germany ===
In 1951 the Deutsche Bundesbahn (DB) rebuilt two Franco–Crosti boilered locomotives with two feedwater heaters located below the main boiler. These were variants of the standard DB class 52 design but were registered as class 42.90 due to the higher axle load.

These locomotives were followed in 1954–58 by the conversion of 31 class 50 locomotives in a 2–10–0 tender configuration with single feedwater heater located under the boiler. These thirty locos formed the new class 50.40 and proved quite successful economically but had problems with corrosion. All locomotives were withdrawn by 1967.

=== Great Britain ===
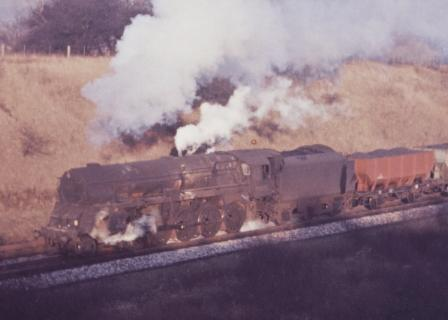
9F 92022 in 1964

Ten of the BR Standard Class 9F locomotives, Nos 92020-9, were built with Franco–Crosti boilers in 1955. Like the German 50.40 these were 2–10–0 tender locomotives with a single feedwater heater under the main boiler.

The standard chimney was still used for exhausting smoke from the fire box. The steam chimney was located on the right-hand (fireman's) side, just forward of the firebox, this can be seen in the photograph; smoke from the chimney and steam from the right hand side. When running at speed the updraft on the smoke chimney was all that was needed. However where more power was needed steam would be sent to the Blast Pipe to draw more air through the firebox. The Crosti preheaters provided less improvement than had been expected, and were a problem for maintenance, owing to acidic fluegases condensing in the feedwater heater and causing corrosion. All were converted back to a more standard form within a few years, the preheaters remaining in place, but blanked off.

=== Ireland ===
In 1951 Oliver Bulleid was the chief mechanical engineer of the Córas Iompair Éireann and was experimenting with new forms of steam locomotive. He converted a 1907 Coey locomotive to use a Franco–Crosti boiler similar to the original Italian designs and to burn peat. The locomotive was a poor steamer and eventually was fitted with a forced-draught fan powered by a diesel engine carried on a wagon behind the tender.
