= Southern Pacific class AC-6 =

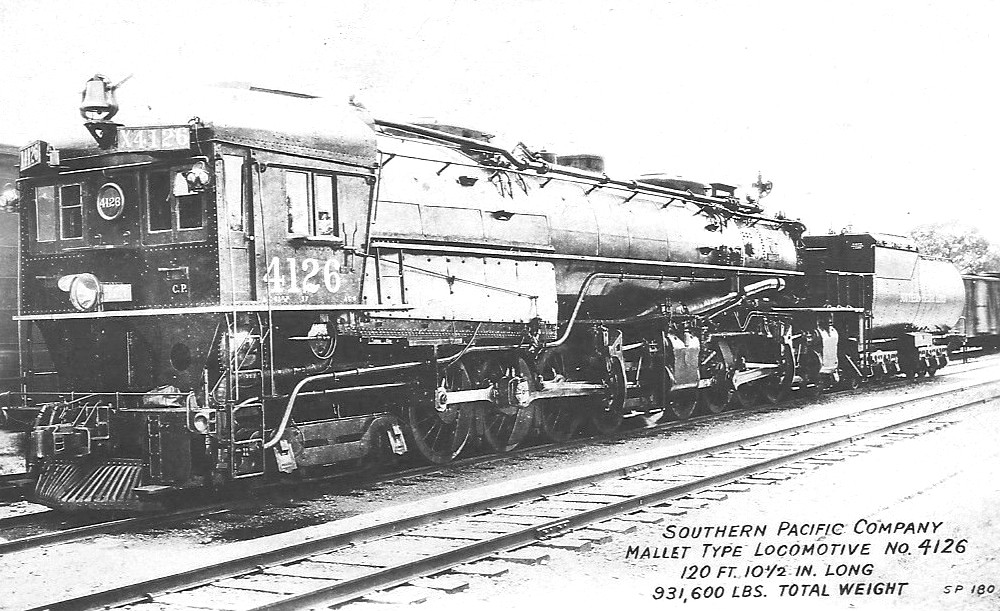
Type and origin
- Power type: Steam
- Builder: Baldwin Locomotive Works
- Serial number: 61353, 61354, 61382-61389, 61416, 61426-61429, 61491-61494, 61535-61538, 61543, 61544
- Build date: May–December 1930
Specifications
- Configuration
  - Whyte: 4-8-8-2
- Gauge: 4 ft 8 1/2 in (1,435 mm) standard gauge
- Driver dia.: 63 in (1,600 mm)
- Adhesive weight: 517,000 lb (235,000 kg; 235 t)
- Loco weight: 639,500 lb (290,100 kg; 290.1 t)
- Boiler pressure: 250 psi (1.7 MPa)
- Feedwater heater: 6S Worthington
- Cylinder size: 24 in × 34 in (610 mm × 864 mm) (bore × stroke)
Performance figures
- Tractive effort: 124,300 lbf (553 kN)
Career
- Operators: Southern Pacific Railroad
- Class: AC-6
- Number in class: 25
- Numbers: 4126 – 4150
- First run: July 10, 1930
- Retired: 1953 – 1955
- Disposition: scrapped

Southern Pacific Railroad's AC-6 class of steam locomotives was the third of the railroad's classes built with a 4-8-8-2 wheel arrangement. Like the earlier AC-4 and AC-5 classes, the AC-6 class were cab forward locomotives. The AC-6 was slightly larger than the previous classes with a higher boiler pressure and tractive effort rating.

In 1947 and 1948, this class was rebuilt with cast steel frames, increasing the overall weight to 648,000 lb (with 523,600 lb on the drivers). At this time, most of the locomotives in the class were also equipped with larger cab windows that became standard for SP's cab forward locomotives beginning with the AC-8 class. One of those locomotives that had been turned from AC-6 to AC-8 was the number 4146.

This class was removed from active service between 1954 and 1955 and they were all scrapped by March 1956.
