= AC-5 =

AC-5 may refer to:

- Altair Coelho AC-5, a speedster airplane
- Aviastroitel AC-5, glider
- USS Vulcan (AC-5), a US Navy collier active during World War I
- Southern Pacific class AC-5, a class of steam locomotive
- AC-5, an IEC Utilization Category
