= AC-4 =

AC-4 or AC4 may refer to:

== Music ==
- AC4 (band), a Swedish hardcore punk band, or their eponymous album

== Vehicles ==
=== Aircraft ===
- Light Wing AC4, an aircraft
- Aviastroitel AC-4 Russia, glider
- Comte AC-4, a two-seat Swiss monoplane

=== Ships ===
- USS Cyclops (AC-4), a US Navy collier ship

=== Trains ===
- Southern Pacific class AC-4, a class of steam locomotive

=== Tanks ===
- AC4 tank, a World War Two Australian cruiser tank

== Technology ==
- AC-4, an IEC Utilization Category
- Dolby AC-4, Dolby Digital audio codec

== Videogames ==
- Ace Combat 04: Shattered Skies, a 2001 video game
- Armored Core 4, a 2006 video game
- Assassin's Creed IV: Black Flag, a 2013 video game

== See also ==
- AC (disambiguation)
