= Southern Pacific class AC-10 =

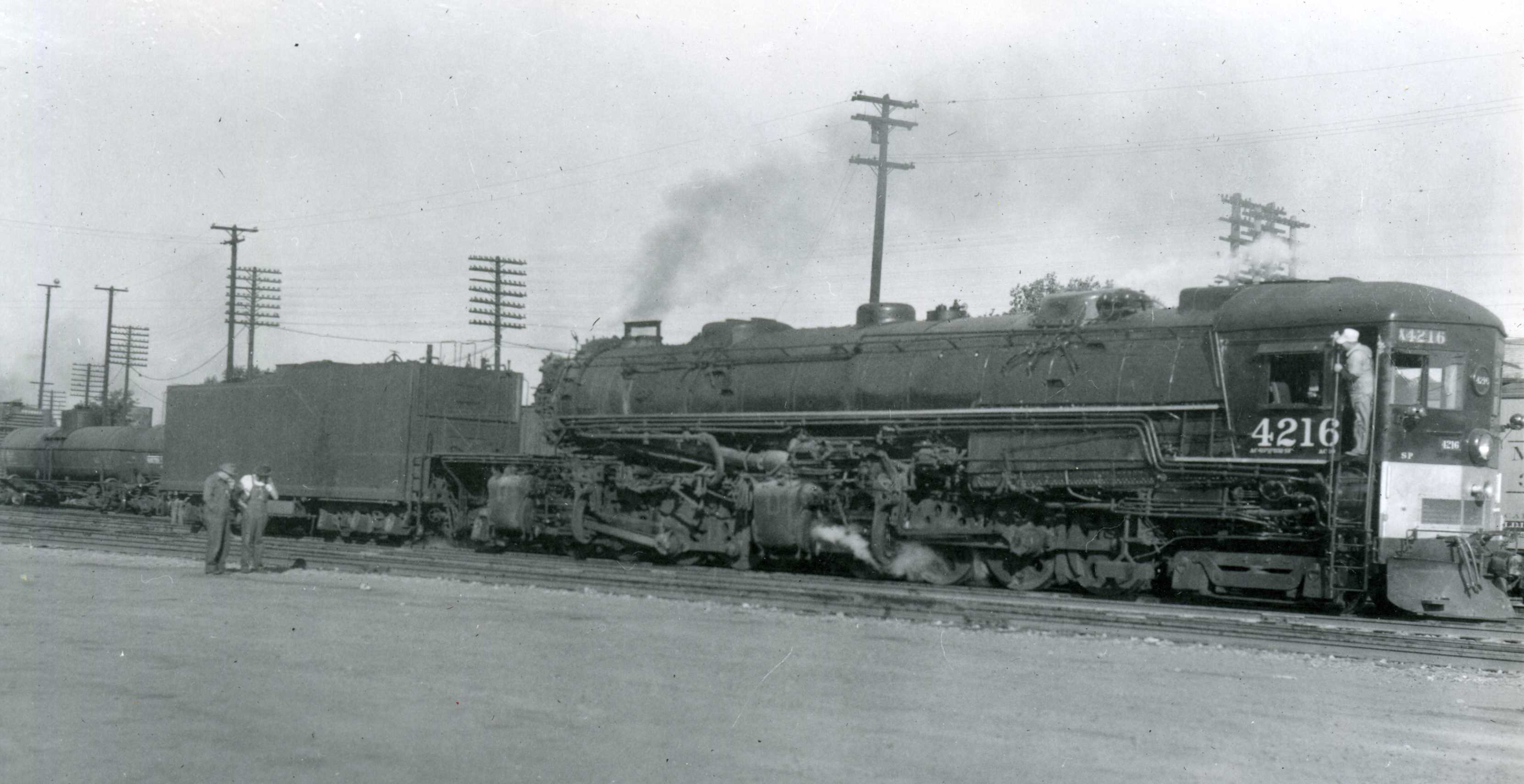
Type and origin
- Power type: Steam
- Builder: Baldwin Locomotive Works
- Serial number: 64287 – 64326
- Build date: January–July 1942
Specifications
- Configuration
  - Whyte: 4-8-8-2
- Gauge: 4 ft 8 1/2 in (1,435 mm) standard gauge
- Driver dia.: 63 in (1,600 mm)
- Adhesive weight: 531,700 lb (241,200 kg; 241.2 t)
- Loco weight: 657,900 lb (298,400 kg; 298.4 t)
- Boiler pressure: 250 psi (1.7 MPa)
- Feedwater heater: 6SA Worthington
- Cylinder size: 24 in × 32 in (610 mm × 813 mm) (bore × stroke)
Performance figures
- Tractive effort: 124,300 lbf (553 kN)
Career
- Operators: Southern Pacific Railroad
- Class: AC-10
- Number in class: 40
- Numbers: 4205 – 4244
- First run: February 17, 1942
- Retired: 1955 – 1958
- Disposition: all scrapped, 4219 tender survives as auxiliary tender for Southern Pacific 4449

Southern Pacific Railroad's AC-10 class was the largest class of cab forward steam locomotives produced for the railroad. The design of this and the previous AC classes proved so successful for SP that the railroad began placing orders for the AC-10's successors, AC-11s, while Baldwin Locomotive Works was still busy building and delivering the AC-10s. Mechanically, the AC-10s were exceptionally similar to their immediate predecessors, the AC-8s.

The first AC-10, number 4205, entered service on February 17, 1942, and the last, 4244, on August 19, 1942. SP used these locomotives for about fifteen years, with the first retirements of this class (three locomotives) occurring on April 5, 1955 and the last (three more of the class) on September 24, 1958. The locomotives were scrapped soon after they were retired, with the last one, number 4243, scrapped on August 7, 1959.

All locomotives were scrapped with none being preserved. However, the tender of 4219 survives being used as an auxiliary tender for Southern Pacific 4449.
