= Southern Pacific class AC-7 =

Type and origin
- Power type: Steam
- Builder: Baldwin Locomotive Works
- Serial number: 61952-61963, 62038-62051
- Build date: January–August 1937
Specifications
- Configuration
  - Whyte: 4-8-8-2
- Gauge: 4 ft 8 1/2 in (1,435 mm) standard gauge
- Driver dia.: 63 in (1,600 mm)
- Adhesive weight: 514,800 lb (233,500 kg; 233.5 t)
- Loco weight: 639,800 lb (290,200 kg; 290.2 t)
- Boiler pressure: 250 psi (1.7 MPa)
- Feedwater heater: 6SA Worthington
- Cylinder size: 24 in × 32 in (610 mm × 813 mm) (bore × stroke)
Performance figures
- Tractive effort: 124,300 lbf (553 kN)
Career
- Operators: Southern Pacific Railroad
- Class: AC-7
- Number in class: 26
- Numbers: 4151 – 4176
- First run: February 8, 1937
- Retired: 1954 – 1958
- Disposition: scrapped

Southern Pacific Railroad's AC-7 class of cab forward steam locomotives was the fourth class of the 4-8-8-2 locomotives purchased by Southern Pacific (SP). The locomotives were built by Baldwin Locomotive Works and shared many of the same characteristics of previous AC class locomotives.

The AC-7s were only slightly larger than their AC-6 predecessors, but they included larger tenders and a beveled cab front in contrast to the earlier classes' flat cab front. In the early 1940s, the majority of the class received larger cab windows of a design that would become standard with the AC-8 class.

In April 1937, locomotive number 4162 was pulled aside for a series of publicity photos at SP's Sacramento, California, shops. It was posed alongside the railroad's first locomotive, C. P. Huntington a diminutive 4-2-4T, especially when compared to 4162.

The AC-7 class locomotives were all removed from active service between 1954 and 1958, and they were all scrapped shortly after their removal from service. The first to be scrapped was 4155 on November 26, 1954, while the last was 4172 on April 24, 1959.
