= AC-9 =

AC-9 may refer to:

- USS Proteus (AC-9), a US Navy collier ship
- Southern Pacific class AC-9, a model of steam locomotive
- AC-9, an IEC utilization category
