= Southern Pacific class AC-12 =

Class of 20 American 4-8-8-2 locomotives

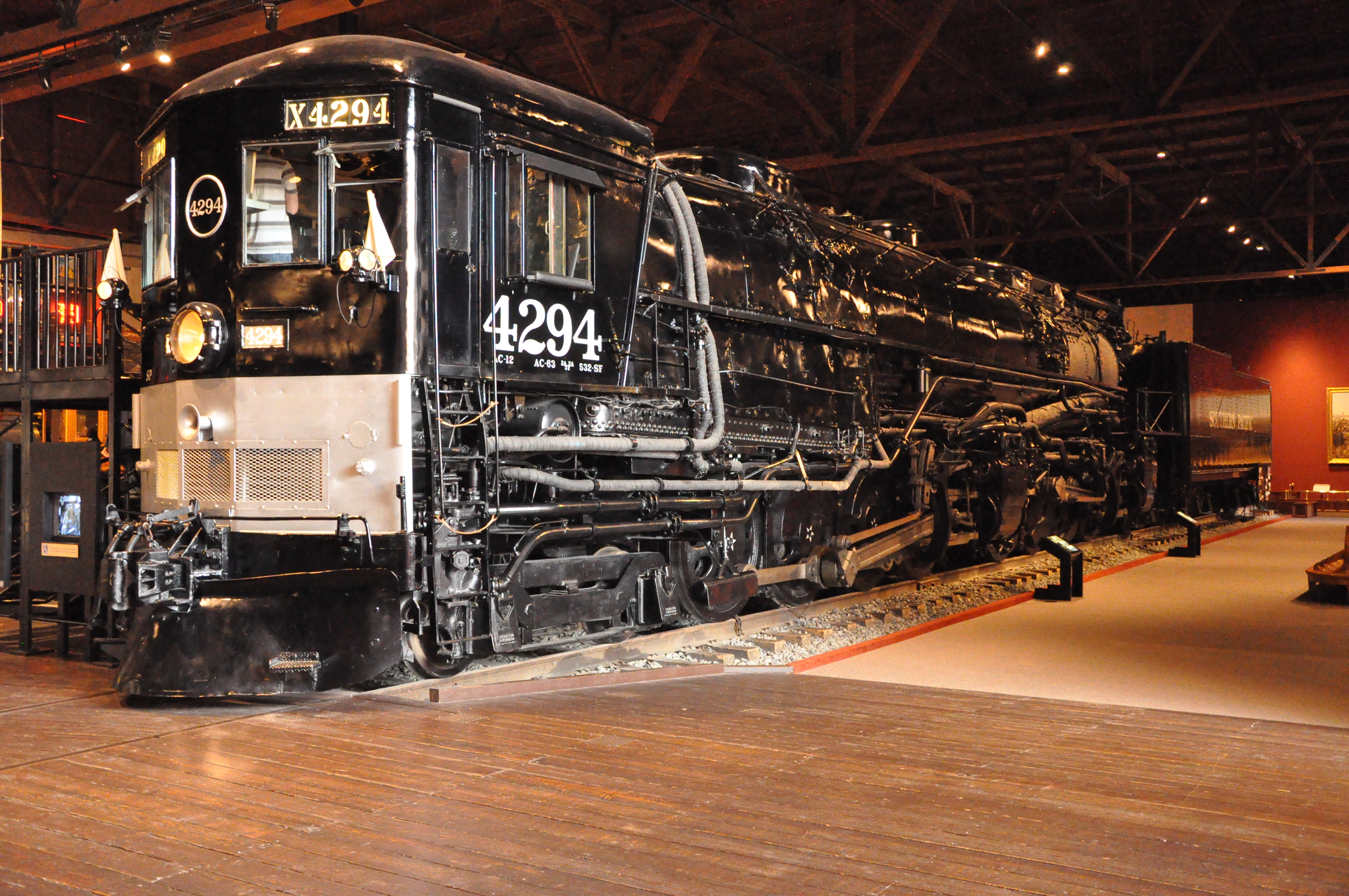
- Southern Pacific 4294 on display at the California State Railroad Museum
Type and origin
- Power type: Steam
- Builder: Baldwin Locomotive Works
- Serial number: 70082–70101
- Build date: October 1943 – March 1944
- Total produced: 20
Specifications
- Configuration
  - Whyte: 4-8-8-2
- Gauge: 4 ft 8 1/2 in (1,435 mm) standard gauge
- Driver dia.: 63 in (1,600 mm)
- Adhesive weight: 531,700 lb (241,200 kg; 241.2 t)
- Loco weight: 657,900 lb (298,400 kg; 298.4 t)
- Total weight: 977,900 lb (443,600 kg; 443.6 t)
- Fuel type: Bunker C (#6 fuel oil)
- Boiler pressure: 250 psi (1.72 MPa)
- Feedwater heater: 6SA Worthington
- Cylinders: Four (simple articulated)
- Cylinder size: 24 in × 32 in (610 mm × 813 mm) (bore × stroke)
Performance figures
- Tractive effort: 124,300 lbf (553 kN)
Career
- Operators: Southern Pacific Railroad
- Class: AC-12
- Numbers: 4275–4294
- First run: October 27, 1943
- Retired: 1955–1958
- Disposition: One preserved (#4294), remainder scrapped

Southern Pacific Railroad's AC-12 class of simple articulated 4-8-8-2 cab forward steam locomotives was the last class of steam locomotives ordered by Southern Pacific. They were built by Baldwin Locomotive Works (BLW) during World War II, with the first, number 4275, entering service on October 27, 1943, and the last, 4294, on March 19, 1944. Each locomotive was effectively a conventional 2-8-8-4 locomotive running in reverse, the tender being coupled at the smokebox end of the locomotive. This was made possible by the use of oil-firing. The distinct features of these locomotives include: a streamlined front with white band, an air horn on the front, a streamlined pilot, a SP 12 wheel box tender, and air compressors mounted on the smokebox. Southern Pacific used these locomotives all over its system, but they were extremely famous for working on Donner Pass & Cascade Summit.

SP used the AC-12s for a little over a decade with the first retirements occurring on April 5, 1955, and the last on September 24, 1958. Only one AC-12, SP 4294, has survived into preservation and is now on display at the California State Railroad Museum.
