= National Metal and Steel =

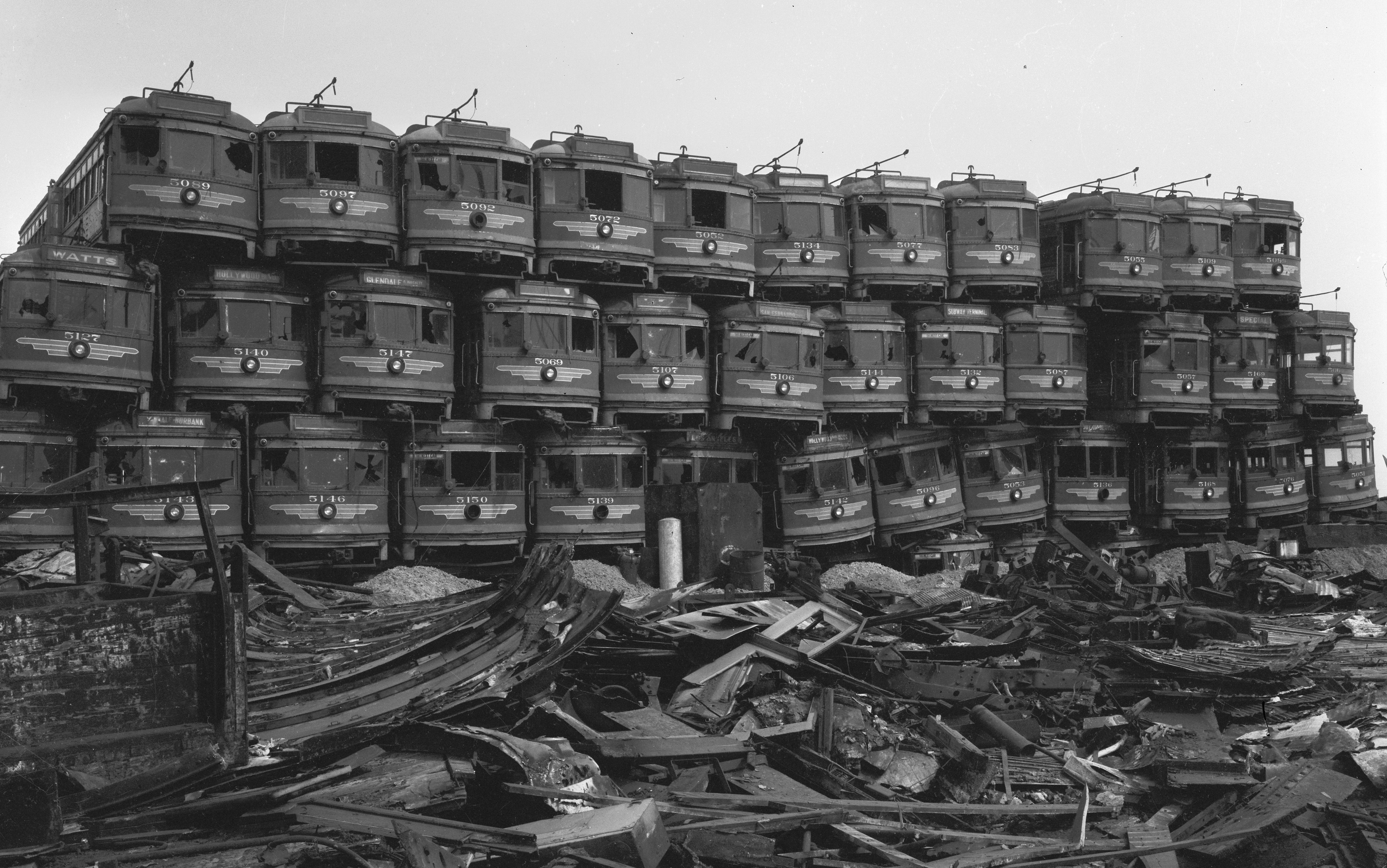
Stacked Pacific Electric Railway Red Cars awaiting demolition at Terminal Island facility.

National Metal and Steel Corporation was engaged in ship dismantling operations at Terminal Island in the Los Angeles Harbor Region of the city of Los Angeles, California.

The president of National Metal and Steel was Harry Faversham.

== History ==
The National Metal and Steel facility was located at the former California Shipbuilding Corporation property. National Metal and Steel was the final destination for many decommissioned United States Navy ships.

In 1953 it was the first U.S. company to export scrap metal to postwar Japan.

It provided for the demolition of many famed Pacific Electric Railway red cars and Los Angeles Railway yellow cars as those public transit systems were eliminated in the Greater Los Angeles Area.

Also, a number of the very heavy coal-fired Southern Pacific class AC-9 articulated locomotives were demolished here. For operational reasons, they had been usable mainly only in New Mexico and Texas, and were very rarely operated elsewhere on the SP system due to clearance considerations.

Operations on Terminal Island ceased on 1 January 1986 when the company lost that facility to a harbor expansion project. National Metal and Steel maintained headquarters in the nearby city of Carson.

== See also ==
- Ship breaking
- Vehicle recycling
