= Southern Pacific class AC-11 =

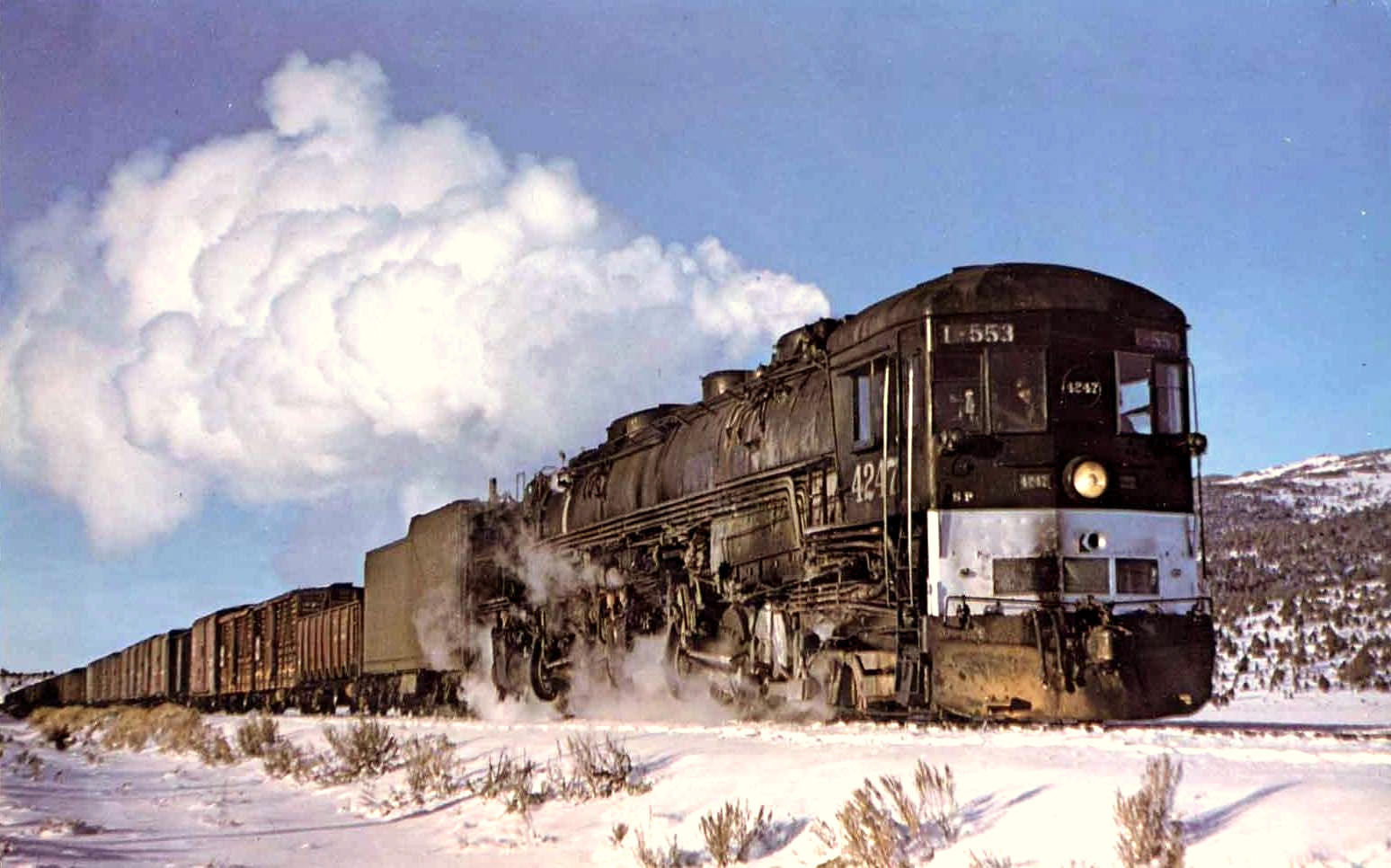
- No. 4247 hauling a revenue train in 1956
Type and origin
- Power type: Steam
- Builder: Baldwin Locomotive Works
- Serial number: 64677–64706
- Build date: November 1942 – April 1943
Specifications
- Configuration
  - Whyte: 4-8-8-2
- Gauge: 4 ft 8 1/2 in (1,435 mm) standard gauge
- Driver dia.: 63 in (1,600 mm)
- Adhesive weight: 531,700 lb (241,200 kg; 241.2 t)
- Loco weight: 657,900 lb (298,400 kg; 298.4 t)
- Fuel type: Bunker C (#6 fuel oil)
- Boiler pressure: 250 psi (1.7 MPa)
- Feedwater heater: 6SA Worthington
- Cylinders: Four (simple articulated)
- Cylinder size: 24 in × 32 in (610 mm × 813 mm) (bore × stroke)
Performance figures
- Tractive effort: 124,300 lbf (553 kN)
Career
- Operators: Southern Pacific Railroad
- Class: AC-11
- Numbers: 4245–4274
- First run: November 24, 1942
- Retired: 1954–1958
- Disposition: All scrapped

Southern Pacific Railroad's AC-11 class of cab forward steam locomotives was the seventh class of 4-8-8-2 locomotives ordered by Southern Pacific (SP) from Baldwin Locomotive Works; SP was so pleased with the AC-10 class built a year earlier that the railroad began placing orders for AC-11s while the AC-10s were still being built and delivered. They were built between November 1942 and April 1943, closely resembling the AC-10s.

The first AC-11, number 4245, entered service on November 24, 1942, and the last, 4274, on May 9, 1943. SP used these locomotives for between 12 and 15 years, with the last retirements from this class occurring on September 24, 1958. Shortly after their retirement, the AC-11s were scrapped, with the last, number 4274, in April of 1959, after pulling a farewell excursion over the cab forward's former stomping ground, Donner Pass.
