= Southern Pacific class AC-5 =

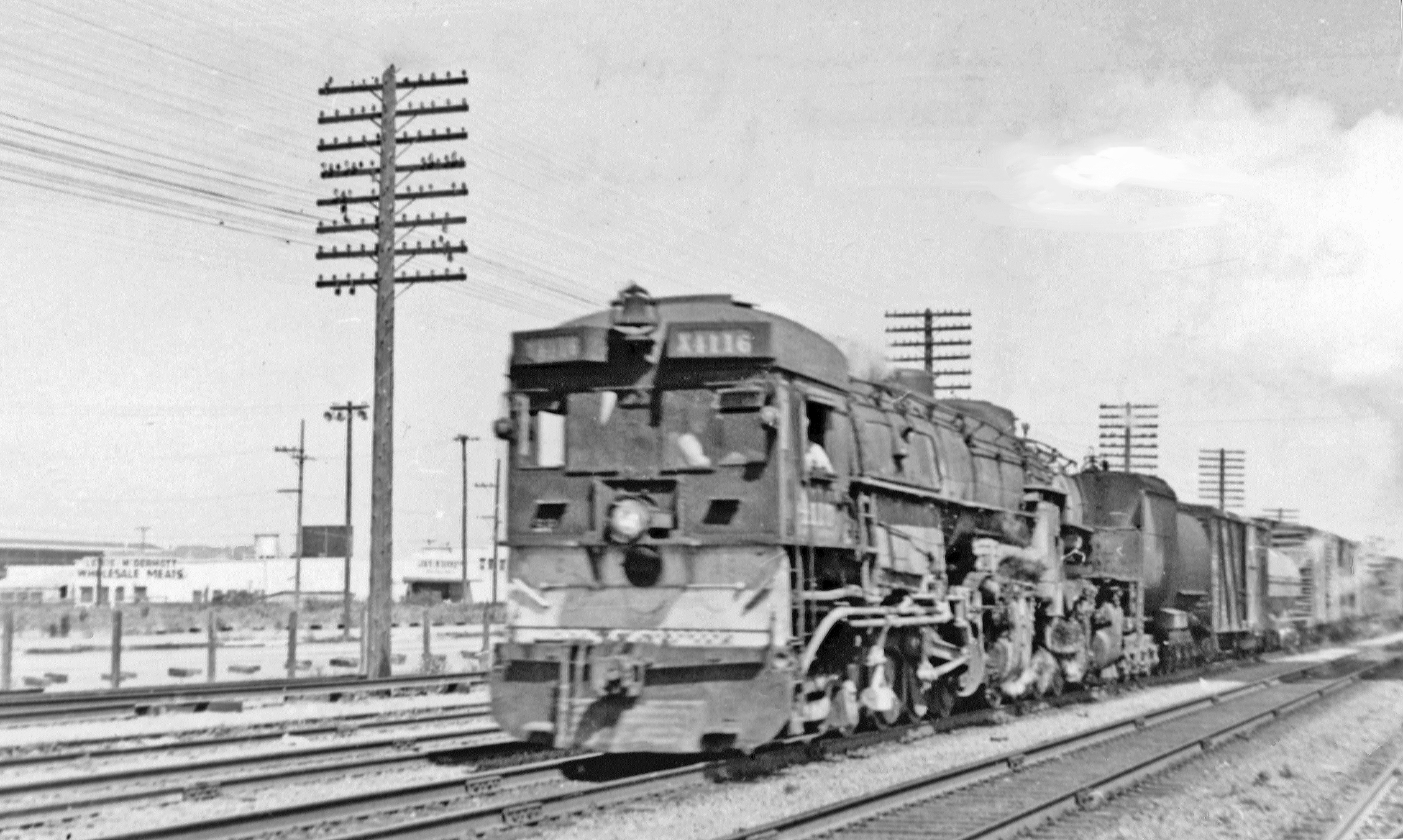
- SP 4116 on freight passing Berkeley bound for Oakland, California
Type and origin
- Power type: Steam
- Builder: Baldwin Locomotive Works
- Serial number: 60866–60869, 60884–60889, 60952–60957
- Build date: July–September 1929
- Total produced: 16
Specifications
- Configuration
  - Whyte: 4-8-8-2
- Gauge: 4 ft 8 1/2 in (1,435 mm) standard gauge
- Driver dia.: 63 in (1.600 m)
- Adhesive weight: 482,500 lb (218,900 kg; 218.9 t)
- Loco weight: 622,600 lb (282,400 kg; 282.4 t)
- Boiler pressure: 235 psi (1.62 MPa)
- Feedwater heater: 4 1/4-BL Worthington
- Cylinder size: 24 in × 32 in (610 mm × 813 mm) (bore × stroke)
Performance figures
- Tractive effort: 116,900 lbf (520 kN)
Career
- Operators: Southern Pacific Railroad
- Class: AC-5
- Numbers: 4110–4125
- First run: August 16, 1929
- Retired: 1955
- Disposition: All scrapped

Southern Pacific Railroad's AC-5 class of steam locomotives was the railroad's second class of 4-8-8-2 cab forward locomotives. They were built between July and September 1929 and placed in service soon after construction. The AC-5 class was only slightly larger than the AC-4 class.

The first locomotive of this class, number 4110, holds the dubious honor of being the first 4-8-8-2 cab forward locomotive to be scrapped when it befell this fate on February 3, 1953, at the railroad's Sacramento, California, shops. The rest of the class were removed from service and scrapped by mid-1955. None of this class was preserved.
