= 2-8-8-4 =

Articulated locomotive wheel arrangement

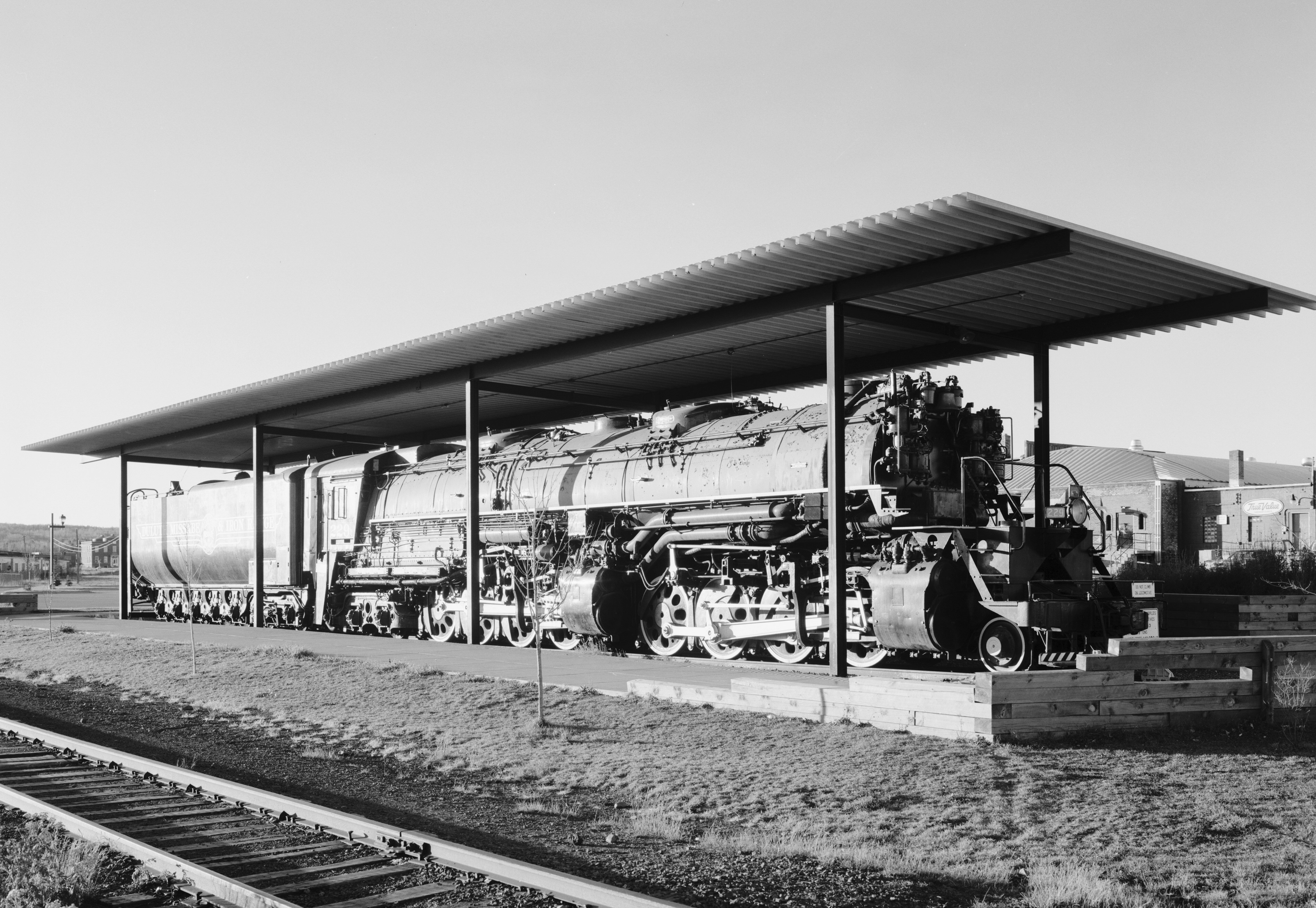
Duluth, Missabe & Iron Range 2-8-8-4 "Yellowstone" No. 229, as preserved in 1987

A 2-8-8-4 steam locomotive, under the Whyte notation, has two leading wheels, two sets of eight driving wheels, and a four-wheel trailing truck. The type was generally named the Yellowstone, a name given it by the first owner, the Northern Pacific Railway, whose lines ran near Yellowstone National Park. Seventy-two Yellowstone-type locomotives were built for four U.S. railroads.

Other equivalent classifications are:

- UIC classification: 1DD2 (also known as German classification and Italian classification)
- French classification: 140+042
- Turkish classification: 45+46
- Swiss classification: 4/5+4/6
- Russian classification: 1-4-0+0-4-2

The equivalent UIC classification is, refined for simple articulated locomotives, (1′D)D2

A similar wheel arrangement exist for Garratt locomotive but is referred to as 2-8-0+0-8-4 since both engine units swivel

A locomotive of this length must be an articulated locomotive. All Yellowstones had fairly small drivers of 63 to 64 inches (1.60 to 1.63 m). (For greater speeds, the Union Pacific Railroad chose a four-wheel leading truck and drivers of 68 inches (1.73 m) for its Big Boy 4-8-8-4 class.)

Several classes of Yellowstone, especially the Duluth, Missabe and Iron Range's locomotives, are among the largest steam locomotives, with the exact ranking depending on the criteria used.

== Northern Pacific ==
The Northern Pacific Railway was the first railroad to order the Class Z5 2-8-8-4 locomotives. The first was built in 1928 by American Locomotive Company; it was the largest locomotive ever built at the time. It had the largest firebox of any steam locomotive with a 182 ft^{2} (16.9 m^{2}) grate area to burn poor-quality Rosebud coal. However the firebed was too large for the available draft, resulting in poor combustion and less than 5,000 hp (3,700 kW) developed. This was fixed by blocking off the first few feet of the grates. Baldwin Locomotive Works built 11 more for the Northern Pacific in 1930. All were scrapped in the 1950s.

== Southern Pacific ==
The Southern Pacific Railroad's famous "cab forward" articulated steam locomotives were effectively a Yellowstone in reverse (4-8-8-2). This was done to spare the crew from the heavy smoke output of the large engines on the former Central Pacific, where tunnels and snow sheds were common and lengthy. One is on display at the California State Railroad Museum in Sacramento. The ready availability of fuel oil in California made them possible. The SP also owned some conventional 2-8-8-4s for use in areas where coal was plentiful and snow sheds were rare. Lima Locomotive Works built 12 AC-9 class locomotives in 1939; they had skyline casings with striped pilots. At first, they burned coal but were later converted to oil. None were saved.

== Duluth, Missabe and Iron Range ==
DM&IR Yellowstones
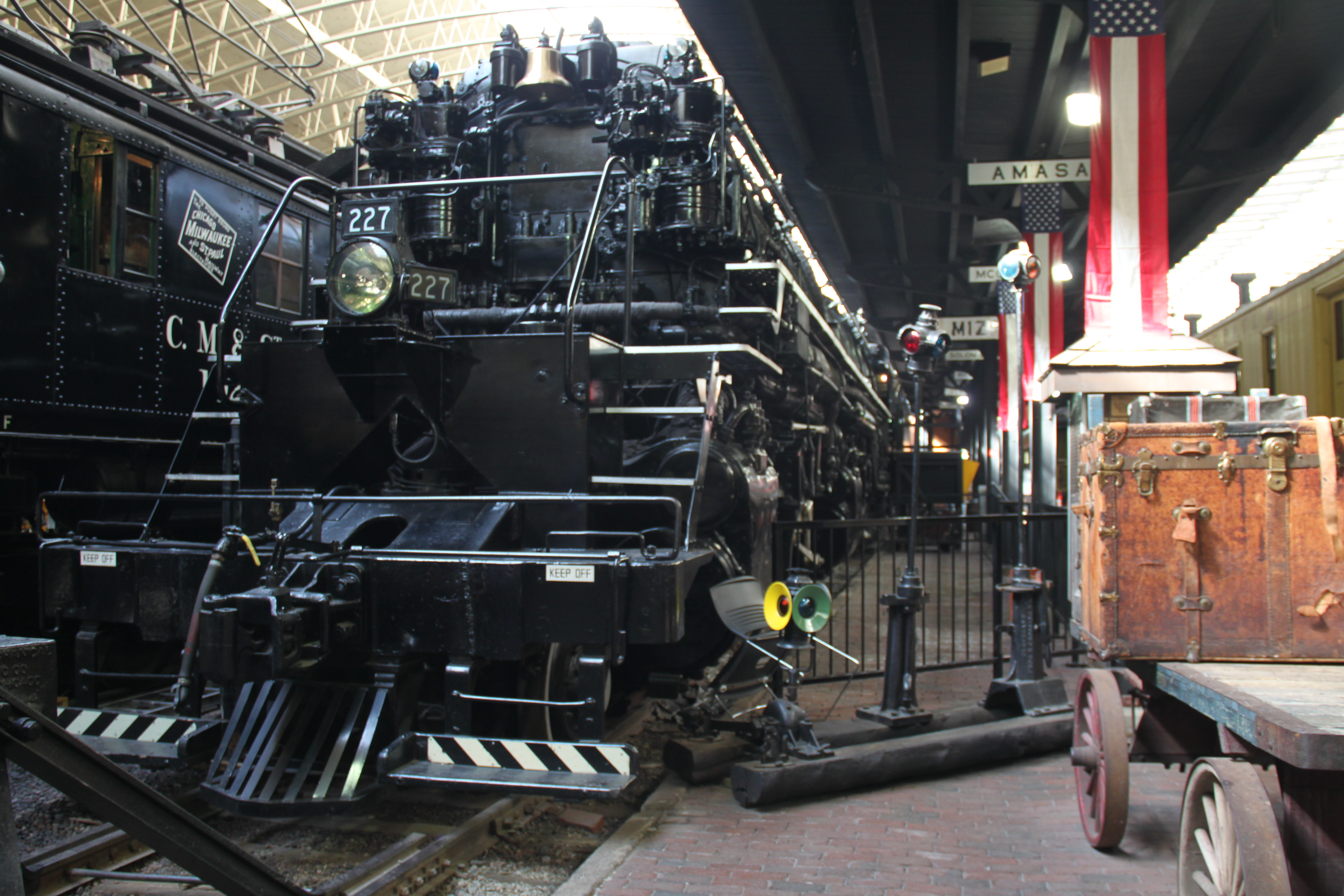
- DM&IR 227 at the Lake Superior Railroad Museum.
Type and origin
- Power type: Steam
- Builder: Baldwin Locomotive Works
- Build date: 1941 (8) 1943 (10)
- Total produced: 18
Specifications
- Configuration
  - Whyte: 2-8-8-4
  - UIC: (1′D)D2′
- Gauge: 4 ft 8 1/2 in (1,435 mm) standard gauge
- Driver dia.: 63 in (1,600 mm)
- Wheelbase: 113.49 ft 6.7 in (34.76 m)
- Axle load: 70,032 lb (31,766 kilograms; 31.766 metric tons)
- Adhesive weight: 560,257 lb (254,128 kg; 254.128 t)
- Loco weight: 695,040 lb (315,260 kg; 315.26 t)
- Tender weight: 438,000 lb (199,000 kg; 199 t)
- Total weight: 1,133,040 lb (513,940 kg; 513.94 t)
- Fuel type: Coal
- Fuel capacity: 26 short tons (24 t; 23 long tons)
- Water cap.: 25,000 US gal (95 m^{3})
- Fuel consumption: 10 t (9.8 long tons; 11 short tons) to 12 t (12 long tons; 13 short tons) of coal per hour 12,000 US gal (45,000 L; 10,000 imp gal) of water per hour
- Firebox
  - Grate area: 125 sq ft (11.6 m^{2})
- Boiler: 108 in (2,743 mm)
- Boiler pressure: 240 psi (1.7 MPa)
- Cylinders: Four
- Cylinder size: 26 by 32 in (660 by 813 mm)
Performance figures
- Maximum speed: 45 mph (72 km/h) (limited with ore trains)
- Power output: 6,250 hp (4,660 kW) @ about 40 mph
- Tractive effort: 140,093 lbf (623.16 kN)
- Factor of adh.: 4.00
Career
- Operators: Duluth, Missabe & Iron Range Railway (DM&IR)
- Class: M-3, M-4
- Numbers: 220–237
- Retired: 1958-1963
- Preserved: 3 (225, 227 & 229)
- Disposition: Three preserved and on display, remainder scrapped.

The Duluth, Missabe and Iron Range Railway hauled iron ore in Minnesota. Iron ore is heavy and the DM&IR operated long trains of ore cars, requiring maximum power. These locomotives were based upon ten 2-8-8-2s that Baldwin had built in the 1930s for the Western Pacific Railroad. The need for a larger, coal-burning firebox and a longer, all-weather cab led to the use of a four-wheel trailing truck, giving them the "Yellowstone" wheel arrangement. They were the most powerful Yellowstones built, producing 140,000 lbf (620 kN) of tractive effort, and had the most weight on drivers so that they were less prone to slipping.

Eight locomotives (class M-3) were built by Baldwin in 1941. The Yellowstones met or exceeded the DM&IR specifications, so 10 more were ordered (class M-4). The second batch was completed in late 1943 after the Missabe's seasonal downturn in ore traffic, so some of the new M-4s were leased to and delivered directly to the Denver and Rio Grande Western Railroad.

The next winter, the D&RGW again leased the DM&IR's Yellowstones as helpers over Tennessee Pass, Colorado, and for other freight duties. The Rio Grande returned the Yellowstones after air-brake failure caused No. 224 to wreck on the Fireclay Loop. This was despite the Rio Grande's earlier assessment that these Yellowstones were the finest engines ever to operate there.

DM&IRs were the only Yellowstones to have a high-capacity pedestal or centipede tender, and had roller bearings on all axles. Some of the locomotives had a cylindrical Elesco feedwater heater ahead of the smoke stack, while others had a Worthington unit with its rectangular box in the same location.

Only one Yellowstone was retired before dieselization took place on the Missabe; No. 237 was sold for scrap after a wreck. The rest of the 2-8-8-4s were retired between 1958 and 1963 as diesel locomotives took over.

Of the eighteen built, three survive and are on display in Minnesota: No. 225 at Proctor, No. 227 at the Lake Superior Railroad Museum in Duluth and No. 229 at Two Harbors.

== Baltimore and Ohio ==
B&O EM-1 2-8-8-4 Yellowstone
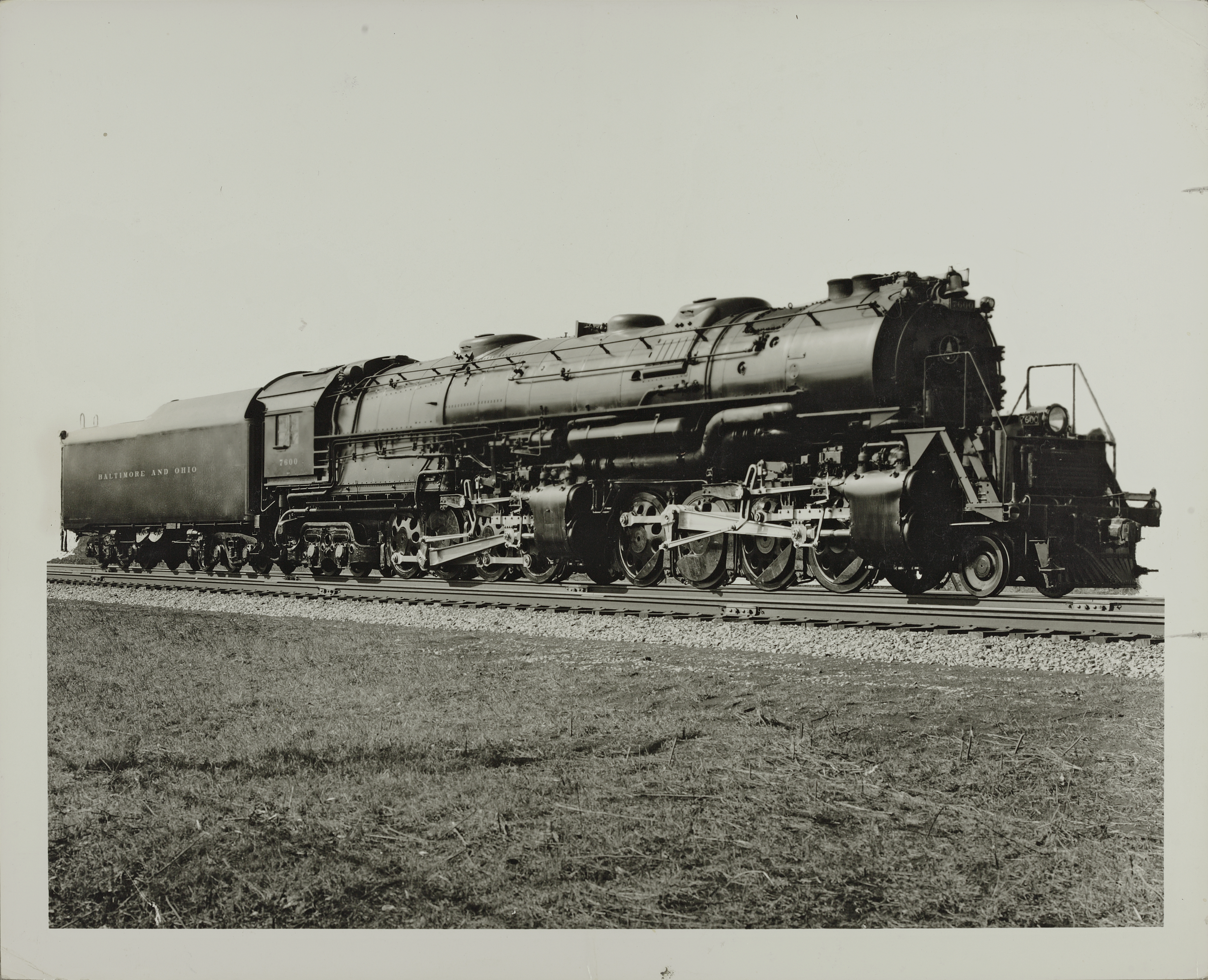
Type and origin
- Power type: Steam
- Builder: Baldwin Locomotive Works
- Build date: 1944 (20) 1945 (10)
- Total produced: 30
Specifications
- Configuration
  - Whyte: 2-8-8-4
  - UIC: (1′D)D2′
- Gauge: 4 ft 8 1/2 in (1,435 mm) standard gauge
- Leading dia.: 30 in (762 mm)
- Driver dia.: 64 in (1,626 mm)
- Trailing dia.: 38 in (965 mm)
- Wheelbase: 81 ft 6.7 in (24.86 m)
- Length: Locomotive: 83 ft 2.9 in (25.37 m); Overall: 128 ft 8 in (39.22 m)
- Width: 11 ft (3.353 m)
- Height: 16 ft (4.877 m)
- Adhesive weight: 485,000 lb (220,000 kg; 220 t)
- Loco weight: 627,000 lb (284,000 kg; 284 t)
- Tender weight: 328,000 lb (149,000 kg; 149 t)
- Total weight: 1,010,700 lb (458,400 kg; 458.4 t)
- Fuel type: Coal
- Fuel capacity: 25 short tons (23 t; 22 long tons)
- Water cap.: 22,000 US gal (83 m^{3})
- Firebox
  - Grate area: 117.5 sq ft (10.92 m^{2})
- Boiler: 100 in (2.54 m) dia.
- Boiler pressure: 235 psi (1.62 MPa)
- Feedwater heater: Worthington
- Heating surface
  - Firebox: 228 by 96 in (5.79 by 2.44 m) with a 90 in (2.29 m) long combustion chamber
- Superheater: Type "E"
- Cylinders: Four
- Cylinder size: 24 by 32 in (610 by 813 mm)
Performance figures
- Power output: 6,000 hp (4,500 kW)
- Tractive effort: 115,000 lbf (510 kN)
- Factor of adh.: 4.22
Career
- Operators: Baltimore and Ohio Railroad (B&O)
- Class: EM-1
- Numbers: 7600–7629 later 650–679
- Last run: April 19, 1960
- Disposition: All thirty scrapped by 1961

When the U.S. entered World War II The American railroads saw increases in traffic. The Baltimore and Ohio Railroad, along with other railroads, wanted to purchase more diesel, as the technology was rapidly improving to the point that it would soon surpass steam locomotives. But the War Production Board regulated the production of steam and diesel locomotives until the war emergency was over. So, alongside the production of 40 new class T-3 4-8-2 type locomotives built at the railroad's own Mt. Clare shops, the B&O ordered 30 class EM-1 Yellowstones from Baldwin in 1944 and 1945, becoming the smallest, most numerous, and most modern of this type.

The EM-1 produced 115,000 pounds-force (510 kN) of tractive effort on 64-inch (1.6 m) drivers with 235 pounds per square inch (1.62 MPa) steam pressure and four 24-by-32-inch (0.61 by 0.81 m) cylinders. The tender carried 22,000 US gallons (83 m^{3}) of water and 25 tons of coal. The engine weighed 627,000 pounds (284 t) while the tender weighed 328,000 pounds (149 t) for a combined 1,010,700 pounds (458.4 t). Nothing bigger could operate within the tunnel clearances and track restrictions on the B&O's main line.

They were equipped with the newest technology of the time. They featured the Worthington feedwater heater, superheater with front-end throttle, Cyclone front end, thermic syphons, a lateral cushioning device in the front pair of drivers on both engines and the front wheels and the trailing truck, and roller bearings on all axles, engine and tender. The latter gave them the reputation of "yard creepers", because three men could move one on a level track with the cylinder cocks open.

B&O's president, Roy B. White, after inspecting the first one delivered, said to the general superintendent of motive power and equipment, A.K. Galloway, "Well, I must say, they have everything!"

Fleet numbers 7600–7619 were built and delivered in 1944 and 7620–7629 in 1945, all by the Baldwin Locomotive Works of Philadelphia, Pennsylvania. They went to work on the Cumberland Division's rugged West End subdivision with its more than 2% grades and tight curves, where they supplemented older 2-8-8-0 EL classes on West Virginia coal and freights. Since the EM-1s had roller bearings throughout, they handled mail and express trains too, replacing two T-3s in this role. In January 21, 1947, when, near Oakland, Maryland, train 29 with engine 7625 derailed with the locomotive rolling onto the engineer's side, killing the engineer. After this accident, the EM-1s were restricted to coal and freight trains in regular service for the rest of their working lives. However, the B&O would use EM-1 No. 7600 for railfan trips in the late 1950s.

The EM-1s also ran on the Pittsburgh Division over Sand Patch Grade near Meyersdale, Pennsylvania. While they mainly hauled general freight workings here, they were best known for pulling loads of iron ore or dolomite westbound, or coal eastbound. In the late 1950s, the B&O used EM-1 No. 7600 for railfan trips mostly between Cumberland, MD, and Connellsville, PA. Well-known photographer and Cumberland, MD native William P. Price captured, on still pictures and 8mm films, the EM-1s on the east side of Sand Patch pulling heavy trains with two of the B&O's 2-10-2 class S1 and S1a Big Sixes on the rear as helpers dispatched from Hyndman, PA.

Near the end of steam they were all sent out to Fairmont and Wheeling, West Virginia, and Lorain, Ohio, with lake-bound coal trains as well as runs between Willard, OH and Garrett, Indiana, until the B&O retired them from 1957. Two engines, 650 (7600) and 659 (7609), were subjects of preservation attempts, but neither succeeded. No. 650 (7600) was earmarked for preservation by the National Museum of Railroad History & Innovation in Baltimore, but a yard master mistakenly interpreted the order for the engine's move to the museum as one for the engine to be taken to the scrapyard. No. 650 was broken up, and the yard master was fired soon after. No. 659 (7609) was offered to the city of Wheeling, West Virginia for static display. The city turned down the offer, and the engine was scrapped. Thus, none of the EM-1s survive today.

== Outside the United States ==
The metre-gauge Central Railway of Brazil took delivery of four 2-8-8-4s from the German firm of Henschel in 1937. They were the only narrow gauge locomotives of this wheel arrangement. They had the largest boilers ever used on a narrow-gauge simple expansion locomotive.

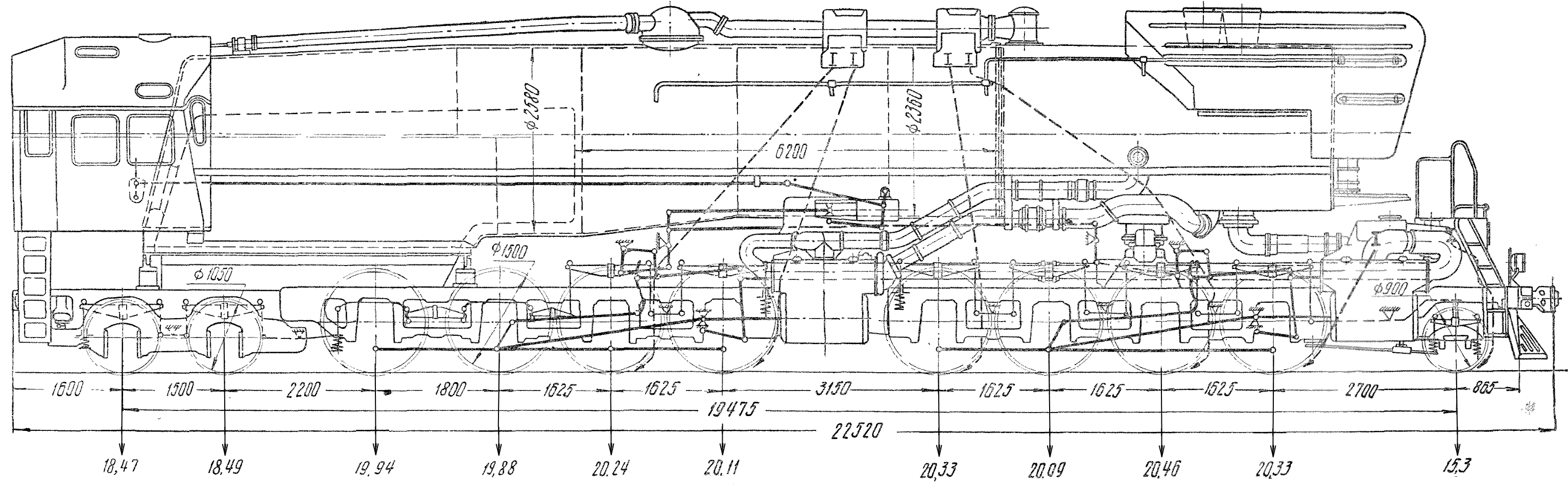
Class P38 locomotive elevation

Soviet Russia constructed two 2-8-8-4 locomotives at the Kolomna Locomotive Works. These were the P38 Class numbers P38.001 and P38.002. The first locomotive carried partial casings over the boiler and smokebox typical of the 1950s. P38.002 bore no such adornments and had a more conventional appearance. Both engines had tenders with part bogie and part fixed frame similar to the American 'centipede' tenders.

== Notes ==
- Barris, W. "The Yellowstone Type Locomotive". SteamLocomotive.com. Archived from the original on 2003-02-03.
- Brown, John K. (1995). The Baldwin Locomotive Works - A Study in American Industrial Practice. Johns Hopkins University Press.
- Dixon, Thomas W. Jr.; Withers, Bob (2007). Baltimore and Ohio's Magnificent 2-8-8-4 EM-1 Articulated Locomotive. Forest, VA: TLC Publishing. ISBN 978-0-939487-83-7.
- LeMassena, R. (2000). "David Moffat's Double Dilemma". The Railway & Locomotive Historical Society Newsletter. 20 (2). Sacramento: Railway & Locomotive Historical Society.
- Rakov, V.A. (1995). Locomotives of the Russian and Soviet Railways - Vol 1 - 1845 to 1955. Moscow: M. Transjeldorizdat.
- Roberts, Charles S. (2001). West End, Cumberland to Grafton 1848–1991 (Second ed.). Baltimore, MD: Barnard, Roberts & Co. Inc. ISBN 0-934118-18-3.
- Sagle, Larry; Stauffer, Alvin (1984). B&O Power, Steam, Diesel and Electric Power on the Baltimore and Ohio Railroad (Eighth printing ed.). LCCN 64023526.
- Westcott, L., ed. (1960). Model Railroader Cyclopedia Volume 1: Steam Locomotives. Milwaukee, WI: Kalmbach. OCLC 19985835.
