= Southern Pacific 4294 =

Preserved SP cab-forward locomotive (SP AC-12 class)

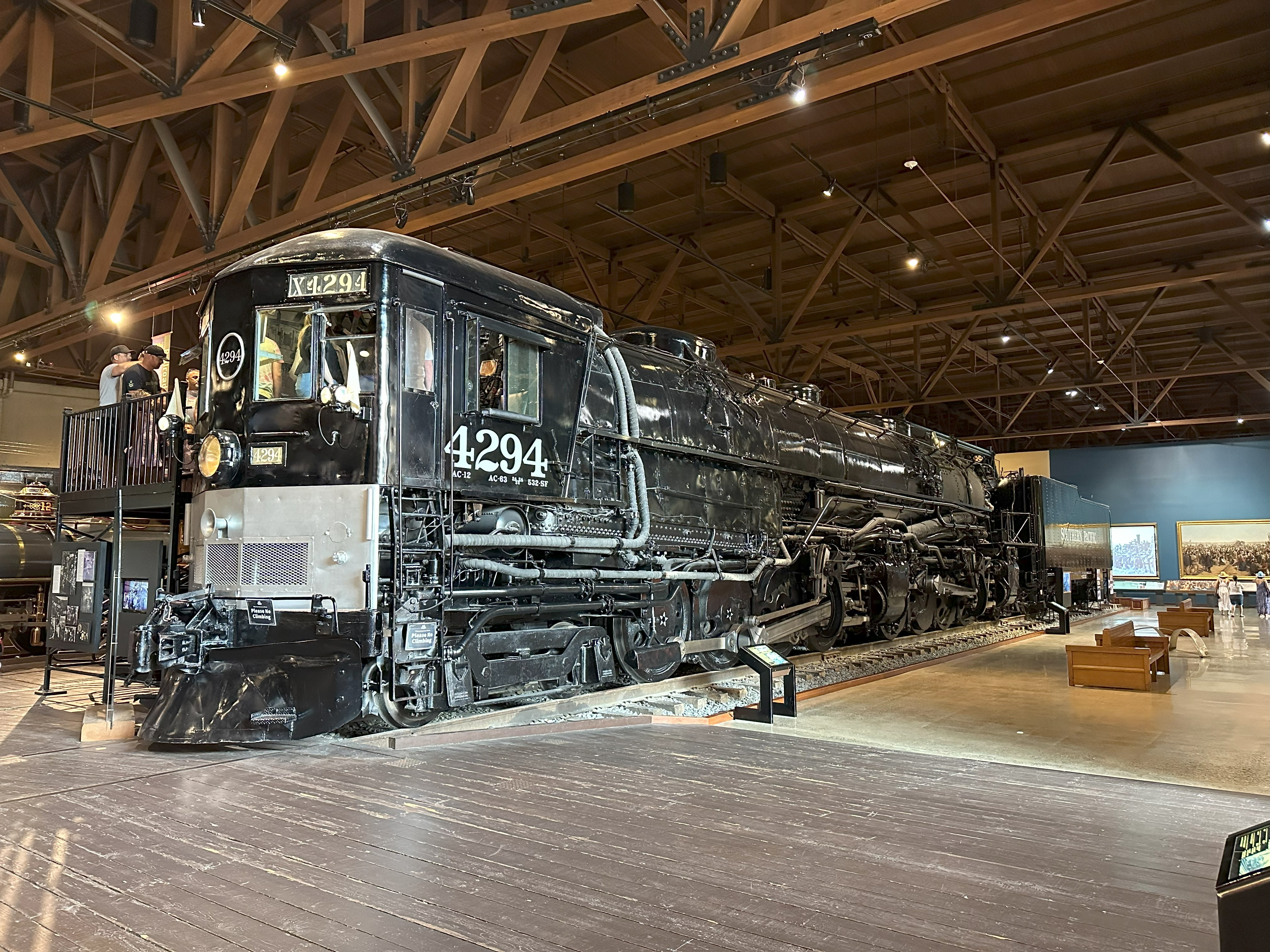
- SP No. 4294 on static display at the California State Railroad Museum in 2024
Type and origin
- Power type: Steam
- Builder: Baldwin Locomotive Works
- Serial number: 70101
- Build date: March 1944
Specifications
- Configuration
  - Whyte: 4-8-8-2
- Gauge: 4 ft 8 1/2 in (1,435 mm) standard gauge
- Driver dia.: 63.5 in (1,613 mm)
- Minimum curve: 319.62 ft (97.42 m) radius or 18°
- Wheelbase: 112 ft 2 in (34.19 m) (engine 67 ft 0.25 in or 20.43 m)(driver 44 ft 7 in or 13.59 m)
- Length: 123 ft 8 in (37.69 m) (loco 78 ft 11 in or 24.05 m)
- Width: 10 ft 0 in (3.05 m)
- Height: 16 ft 4 in (4.98 m)
- Adhesive weight: 531,700 lb (241,200 kg; 241.2 t)
- Loco weight: 657,900 lb (298,400 kg; 298.4 t)(boiler empty 576,800 lb)
- Tender weight: 393,300 lb (178,400 kg) (empty 160,000 lb or 73,000 kg)
- Total weight: 1,051,200 lb (476,800 kg)
- Tender type: Rectangular Model 220-R-6
- Fuel type: Bunker C (#6 fuel oil)
- Water cap.: Boiler 10,935 US gal (41,390 L; 9,105 imp gal) / Nathan 4000-C Non-Lifting Injector 12,000 gal/h (45 m^{3}/h; 10,000 imp gal/h)
- Tender cap.: 6,100 US gal (23,000 L; 5,100 imp gal) (Oil); 22,000 US gal (83,000 L; 18,000 imp gal) (Water)
- Sandbox cap.: 2 short tons (1.8 t; 1.8 long tons) to front 3 drivers of both engines
- Firebox
  - Grate area: 139 sq ft (12.9 m^{2})
- Boiler: Diameter 108.125 in (2,746 mm)
- Boiler pressure: 250 psi (1.7 MPa)
- Feedwater heater: Worthington Type 6-SA 12,000 gal/h (45 m^{3}/h; 10,000 imp gal/h)
- Heating surface
  - Firebox: 1,700 °F (930 °C)
  - Tubes: 3,456 sq ft (321.1 m^{2})
  - Flues: 1,834 sq ft (170.4 m^{2})
  - Tubes and flues: 240 tubes / 91 flues
- Superheater: Elesco Type E
- Cylinders: Four (simple articulated)
- Cylinder size: 24 in × 32 in (610 mm × 810 mm) dia × stroke
- Valve gear: Inverted Walschaerts
- Valve type: Dual piston "spool"
- Loco brake: Air
- Train brakes: Air
- Couplers: Knuckle
Performance figures
- Maximum speed: 63 mph (101 km/h)
- Power output: 6,000 hp (4,500 kW) at 40 mph (64 km/h)
- Tractive effort: 124,300 lbf (553 kN)
- Factor of adh.: 4.28
Career
- Operators: Southern Pacific Railroad
- Class: AC-12
- Number in class: 20
- Numbers: SP 4294
- Nicknames: Cab Forward
- First run: March 19, 1944
- Retired: March 5, 1956
- Restored: May 1981 (cosmetically)
- Current owner: The City of Sacramento, California
- Disposition: On static display

Southern Pacific 4294 (SP 4294) is a preserved AC-12 class 4-8-8-2 cab-forward–type steam locomotive that was owned and operated by the Southern Pacific Railroad (SP). It was built by the Baldwin Locomotive Works (BLW) in March 1944 and was used hauling Southern Pacific Railroad's (SP) trains over the Sierra Nevada, often working on Donner Pass in California. Today it is preserved at the California State Railroad Museum (CSRM) in Sacramento, California.

== History ==
SP 4294 was the last of 20 Southern Pacific class AC-12 4-8-8-2 cab-forward locomotives in a larger series of 256 Southern Pacific articulated cab-forwards starting with class AC-1. An articulated locomotive is essentially two locomotives sharing a fire box, boiler and crew. The front locomotive has its cranks quartered 90° apart. The front and rear sets of drive axles are free to roll out of phase with respect to each other. If unloaded, the locomotive has a vertical oscillation, near 50 miles per hour (80 km/h), that can lift the tires above the rails.

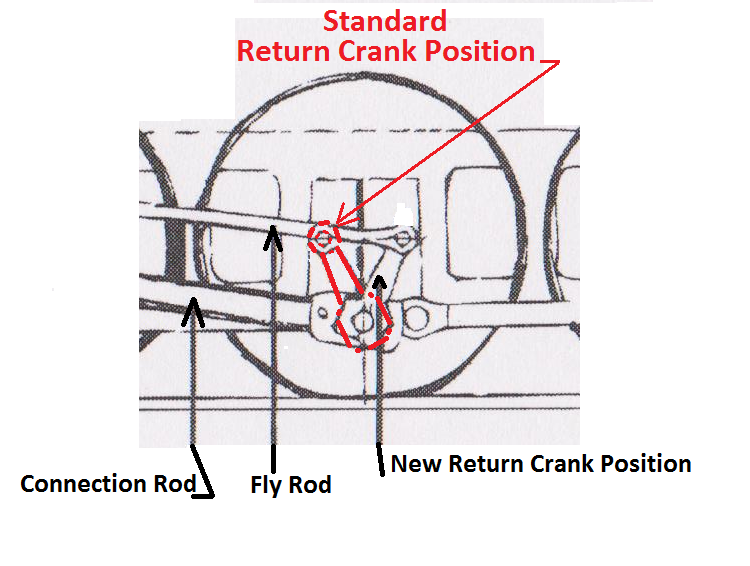
Conventional Walschaerts return crank position in red

Its most distinguishing feature was that the cab and firebox were at the front of the locomotive instead of at the rear. This was done essentially by running a 2-8-8-4 machine backwards with appropriate modifications. The engineer and fireman swapped sides and faced away from the firebox. The tender remained behind the locomotive to maintain the improved forward vision; this was possible because the locomotive burned Bunker C fuel oil rather than coal, so the fuel could easily be piped from the tender to the firebox, unlike a coal-burning locomotive. The smoke box end coupling was strengthened. The power reverse lever (Johnson Bar) and steam throttle motion direction were reversed. The drive wheel axles were also reversed, end for end without rekeying the return fly cranks, to reverse the expansion link timing on both sides.

The cab-forward design was useful in the long tunnels and snow sheds of Donner Pass and other mountainous regions where it kept smoke, heat, and soot away from the operating crew, allowing them to breathe clean air in such enclosed spaces. It entered service on March 19, 1944, and was retired from active service on March 5, 1956.

== Preservation ==
The SP was convinced to preserve one of the class and donated SP 4294 to the City of Sacramento, California, where it was put on outdoor display October 19, 1958 at the SP station next to the C. P. Huntington, the railroad's first locomotive. Construction for Interstate 5 necessitated a move for the locomotive and it was stored in the SP shops until May 1981. At that time it was moved again, this time to its current location, the California State Railroad Museum, where it remains on static display.

If it had not been for the negotiating efforts of the Railway and Locomotive Historical Society in the 1950s, SP 4294 likely would have been scrapped along with all of the other SP cab-forward locomotives. As a result, SP 4294 is the only SP cab-forward and the only 4-8-8-2 in existence today.

=== Planned Restoration ===
At one time, it was hoped that No. 4294 could be restored to operating condition. According to CSRM personnel, the biggest impediments toward such a project are the estimated costs and the current policies of both Union Pacific Railroad and BNSF Railway in regards to operations. The cost of such a restoration is estimated between $1 million and $1.5 million, an amount that the museum feels would be prohibitive given the current prospects for its eventual operation.
