= Light Wing AC4 =

Swiss light-sport aircraft

AC4
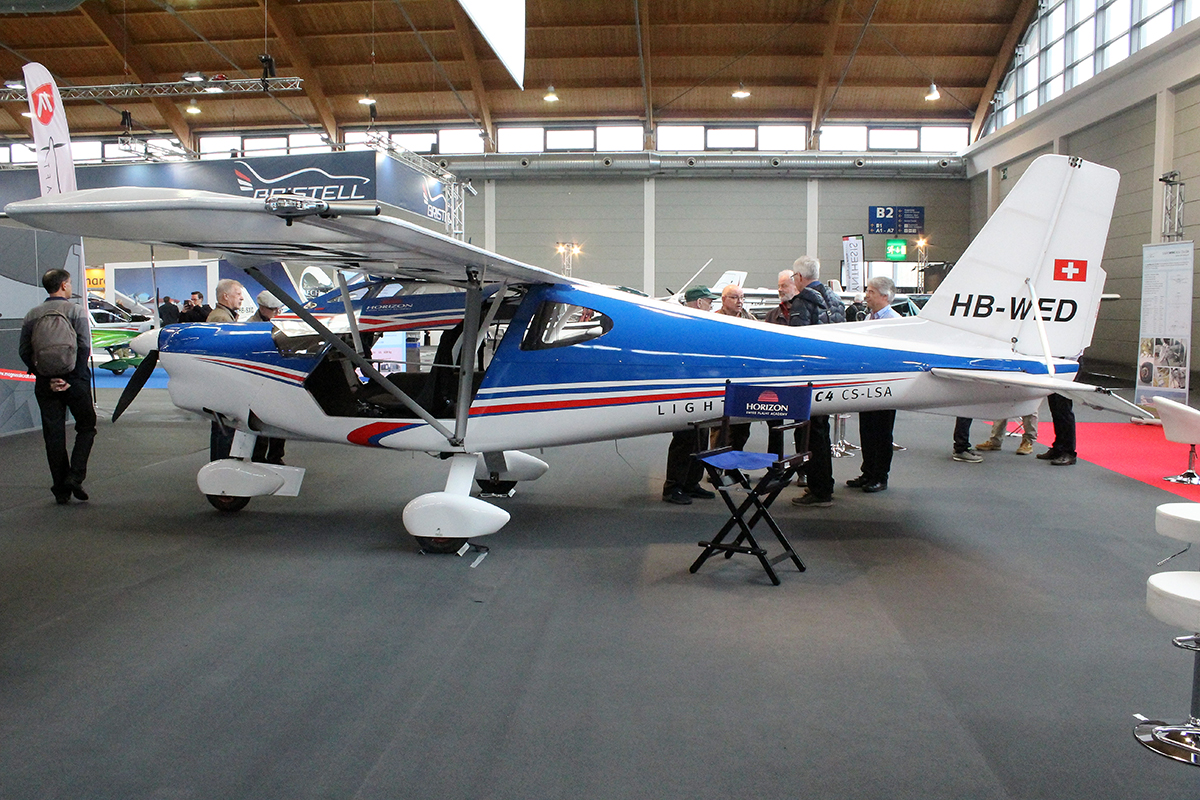

General information
- Type: Ultralight aircraft and Light-sport aircraft
- National origin: Switzerland
- Manufacturer: Light Wing AG
- Designer: Hans Gygax
- Status: In production (2019)

History
- Introduction date: 2013

The Light Wing AC4 is a Swiss ultralight and light-sport aircraft, designed by Hans Gygax and produced by Light Wing AG of Stans. The aircraft was publicly introduced at the AERO Friedrichshafen show in 2013. It is supplied complete and ready-to-fly.

== Design and development ==
The AC4 was designed to comply with the Fédération Aéronautique Internationale microlight rules and US light-sport aircraft rules. It features a strut-braced high-wing, with "V"-struts and jury struts, a two-seats-in-side-by-side configuration enclosed cockpit, fixed tricycle landing gear and a single engine in tractor configuration.

The aircraft is made from a combination of composites and aluminum sheet, with its tailboom made from a single large diameter aluminium tube and the wings and tail surfaces covered in aluminium. Its 9.45 m (31.0 ft) span wing has an area of 16.65 m^{2} (179.2 sq ft), is supported by V-struts and mounts flaps. The standard engine available is the 100 hp (75 kW) Rotax 912ULS or Rotax 912iS four-stroke powerplant.

The AC4 can accommodate one pilot and one passenger and was also designed for aero-towing gliders. It can also accommodate a stretcher for Medevac missions. It received European European Aviation Safety Agency type certification to the Certification Specification for Light Sport Aeroplanes (CS-LSA) on 6 August 2015.

== Specifications (AC4 LSA) ==
Data from Bayerl, Tacke and manufacturer

General characteristics

- Crew: one
- Capacity: one passenger
- Length: 7.04 m (23 ft 1 in)
- Wingspan: 9.60 m (31 ft 6 in)
- Height: 2.67 m (8 ft 9 in)
- Wing area: 16.65 m^{2} (179.2 sq ft)
- Empty weight: 350 kg (772 lb)
- Gross weight: 600 kg (1,323 lb)
- Fuel capacity: 100 litres (22 imp gal; 26 US gal)
- Powerplant: 1 × Rotax 912iS four cylinder, liquid and air-cooled, four stroke aircraft engine, 75 kW (101 hp)
- Propellers: 3-bladed composite

Performance

- Cruise speed: 160 km/h (99 mph, 86 kn)
- Stall speed: 63 km/h (39 mph, 34 kn) flaps down
- Never exceed speed: 210 km/h (130 mph, 110 kn)
- Range: 600 km (370 mi, 320 nmi)
- Rate of climb: 6 m/s (1,200 ft/min)
- Wing loading: 32.7 kg/m^{2} (6.7 lb/sq ft)
