= Southern Pacific class AC-8 =

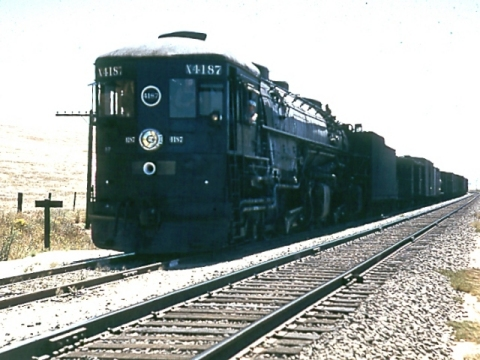
Type and origin
- Power type: Steam
- Builder: Baldwin Locomotive Works
- Serial number: 62265 – 62292
- Build date: July–October 1939
Specifications
- Configuration
  - Whyte: 4-8-8-2
- Gauge: 4 ft 8 1/2 in (1,435 mm) standard gauge
- Driver dia.: 63 in (1,600 mm)
- Adhesive weight: 531,700 lb (241,200 kg; 241.2 t)
- Loco weight: 657,900 lb (298,400 kg; 298.4 t)
- Boiler pressure: 250 psi (1.7 MPa)
- Feedwater heater: 6SA Worthington
- Cylinder size: 24 in × 32 in (610 mm × 813 mm) (bore × stroke)
Performance figures
- Tractive effort: 124,300 lbf (553 kN)
Career
- Operators: Southern Pacific Railroad
- Class: AC-8
- Number in class: 28
- Numbers: 4177 – 4204
- First run: August 18, 1939
- Retired: 1955 – 1957
- Disposition: All scrapped

Southern Pacific Railroad's AC-8 class of cab forward steam locomotives was the fifth of SP's 4-8-8-2 classes. They were built by Baldwin Locomotive Works in 1939.

The AC-8s were the first to receive the larger redesigned cab windows as standard equipment that were retrofitted onto earlier AC class locomotives. The locomotives were only slightly larger than their AC-7 predecessors.

On November 19, 1941, No. 4193 caught on fire. It was carrying a freight train passing through Santa Susana Pass near Los Angeles. The train caught on fire because of a failure to shut off the oil feed. It was carrying 96 cars (not including its tender) and a caboose. A knuckle on the front end of the seventy-fifth car was broken when the accident occurred. On May 3, 1941, No. 4199 suffered a boiler explosion at Cooper, California.

The first AC-8 entered service on August 18, 1939, and the last on November 26, 1939. Number 4173 was first to be retired from active service on September 2, 1954, while 4172 was the last on January 9, 1958. All of these locomotives were scrapped, beginning with 4155 on November 26, 1954, and ending with 4172 on April 24, 1959.
