= USS Vulcan (AC-5) =

Collier of the United States Navy

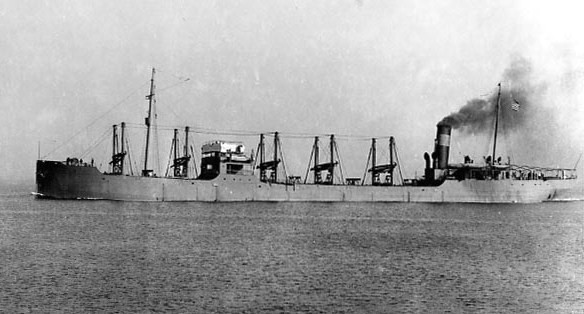

History

United States
- Name: USS Vulcan
- Namesake: Vulcan
- Builder: Maryland Steel Company, Sparrows Point, Maryland
- Laid down: 5 October 1908
- Launched: 15 May 1909
- Commissioned: 2 October 1909
- Decommissioned: 4 May 1912
- Recommissioned: 25 February 1914
- Decommissioned: 20 July 1921
- Reclassified: AC-15, 17 July 1920
- Stricken: 26 April 1923
- Fate: Sold, 12 December 1923

General characteristics
- Type: Collier
- Displacement: 11,250 long tons (11,430 t)
- Length: 403 ft (123 m)
- Beam: 53 ft (16 m)
- Draft: 24 ft 8 in (7.52 m) (mean)
- Depth of hold: 29 ft 6 in (8.99 m)
- Speed: 12.82 kn (14.75 mph; 23.74 km/h)
- Complement: 82
- Armament: None

USS Vulcan (Collier No. 5/AC-5) was a collier of the United States Navy.

The second ship to bear the name, she was laid down on 5 October 1908, at Sparrows Point, Maryland, by the Maryland Steel Company, launched on 15 May 1909, and commissioned at the Norfolk Navy Yard on 2 October 1909.

== Service history ==
=== 1909–1912 ===
For more than two years, Vulcan operated out of Norfolk, providing coal and stores for the ships of the Atlantic Fleet to support their operations off the east coast and in the West Indies. Vulcan was placed out of service at the Portsmouth Navy Yard on 4 May 1912.

=== 1914–1921 ===
The collier remained inactive until reactivated and placed back in service on 25 February 1914. Resuming her coaling operations with the Atlantic Fleet, Vulcan ranged from Portsmouth, New Hampshire, to Guantanamo Bay, Cuba, and from Melville, Rhode Island, to Vera Cruz, Mexico. In addition to carrying coal, she also transported stores and ordnance supplies for the Atlantic Fleet Cruiser Squadron.

During World War I, Vulcan served the Fleet Train, supplying coal for ships of the fleet. After hostilities ended, the collier was transferred to the Naval Overseas Transportation Service on 2 January 1919 and served that organization until she was returned to the Fleet Train on 23 June.

After routine operations through the remainder of that year and all of 1920, the collier sailed for European waters on 12 February 1921 to begin a tour of duty supporting American warships attempting to provide an element of stability there during the troubled postwar years. Arriving at Cherbourg, France on 28 February, she discharged passengers and coaled the protected cruiser Chattanooga before sailing soon thereafter for Malta to deliver coal to the armored cruiser Pittsburgh on 21 March.

Vulcan then sailed for the Adriatic and arrived at Pola on 26 March. Sailing five days later, she reached Naples on 3 April but soon got underway for Gibraltar to discharge cargo and passengers.

=== Decommissioning and sale ===
After returning to New York on 30 April, Vulcan was decommissioned at the Norfolk Navy Yard on 20 July. Following almost two years in reserve, the collier was struck from the Naval Vessel Register on 26 April 1923. She was sold to N. Block and Co., of Norfolk on 12 December 1923.
