= Southern Pacific class AC-9 =

Class of American steam locomotives

Southern Pacific AC-9
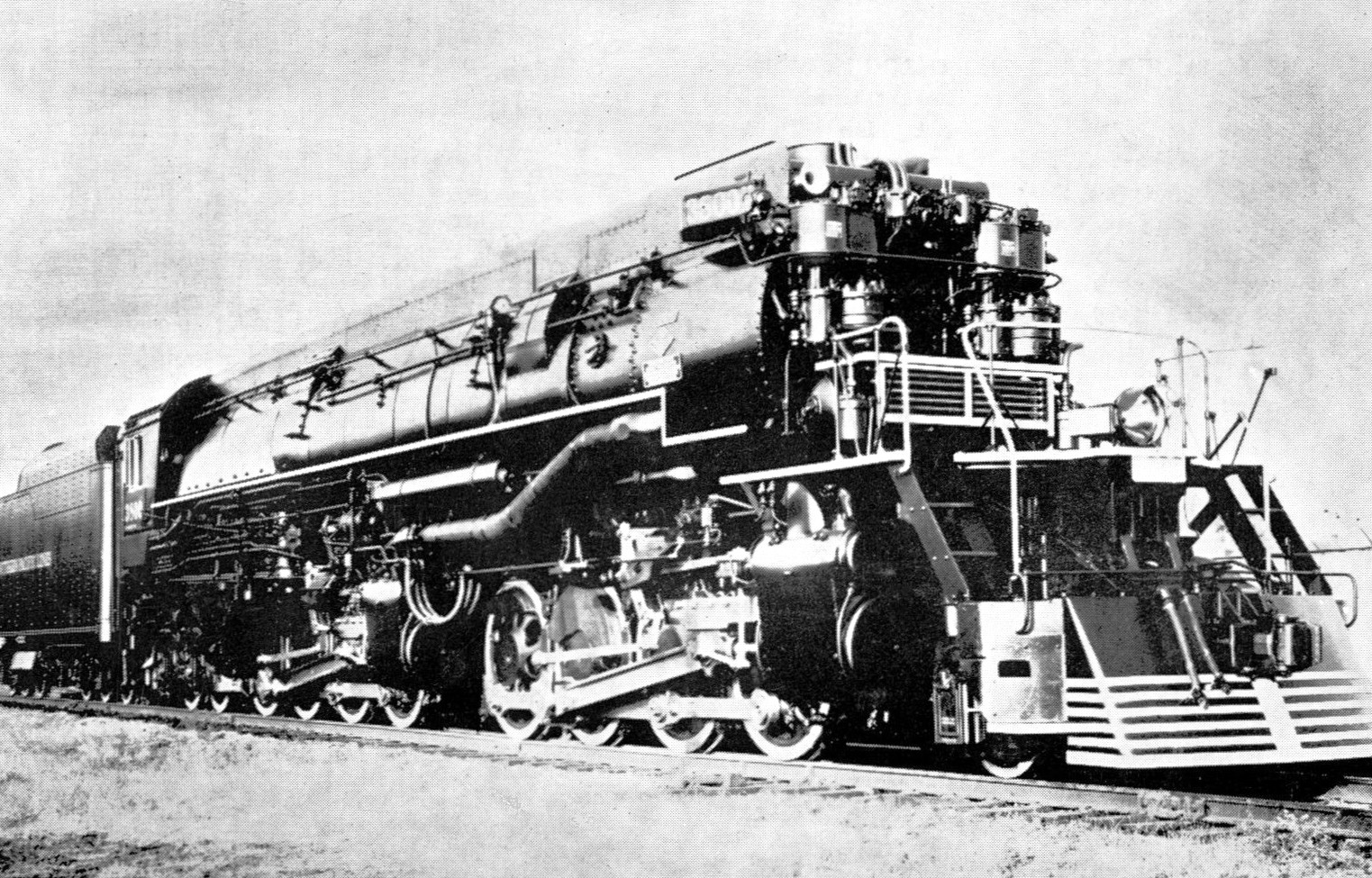
Type and origin
- Power type: Steam
- Builder: Lima Locomotive Works
- Serial number: 7765–7776
- Build date: 1939
- Total produced: 12
Specifications
- Configuration
  - Whyte: 2-8-8-4
  - UIC: (1′D)D2′ h4
- Gauge: 4 ft 8 1/2 in (1,435 mm)
- Driver dia.: 63 1/2 in (1,613 mm)
- Axle load: 66,400 lb (30.1 tonnes)
- Adhesive weight: 522,200 lb (236.9 tonnes)
- Loco weight: 677,200 lb (307.2 tonnes)
- Total weight: 998,000 lb (453 t)
- Fuel type: Oil (originally coal)
- Fuel capacity: 28 short tons (25 t; 25 long tons)
- Water cap.: 22,100 US gallons (84,000 L; 18,400 imp gal)
- Firebox
  - Grate area: 139.5 sq ft (12.96 m^{2})
- Boiler pressure: 250 psi (1.72 MPa)
- Heating surface: 6,918 sq ft (642.7 m^{2})
- Superheater
  - Heating area: 2,831 sq ft (263.0 m^{2})
- Cylinders: Four (simple articulated)
- Cylinder size: 24 in × 32 in (610 mm × 813 mm)
- Valve gear: Walschaerts
Performance figures
- Tractive effort: 123,364 lbf (548.75 kN)
Career
- Operators: Southern Pacific Company
- Class: AC-9
- Numbers: 3800–3811
- Nicknames: Reverse cab forward
- Disposition: All scrapped

The AC-9 was a class of articulated steam locomotive operated by Southern Pacific Railroad. The twelve AC-9 class locomotives were purchased from Lima in 1939 and were specifically designed to burn low grade bituminous coal mined in New Mexico.

The AC-9s were partially streamlined (the only articulated steam engines to be so equipped), having "skyline casings" inspired by Lima's GS series of 4-8-4's, also made for Southern Pacific, and were equipped with coal tenders, unlike the cab forwards. The wheel arrangement was 2-8-8-4, which was nicknamed "Yellowstone".

Between 1939 and 1953, all the twelve AC-9 engines were in service between Tucumcari, New Mexico, El Paso, Texas, and Tucson, Arizona, where they mainly pulled freight trains and occasionally also passenger trains such as the Golden State Limited. Between May and August 1950, they were converted to burn oil instead of coal, and in spring 1953 eleven of them moved to Southern Pacific's Modoc line between Sparks, Nevada, and Alturas, California, where they worked in freight service from 1953 until retirement in early summer 1956.

All examples were scrapped between 1953 and 1956.
