= Southern Pacific class AC-4 =

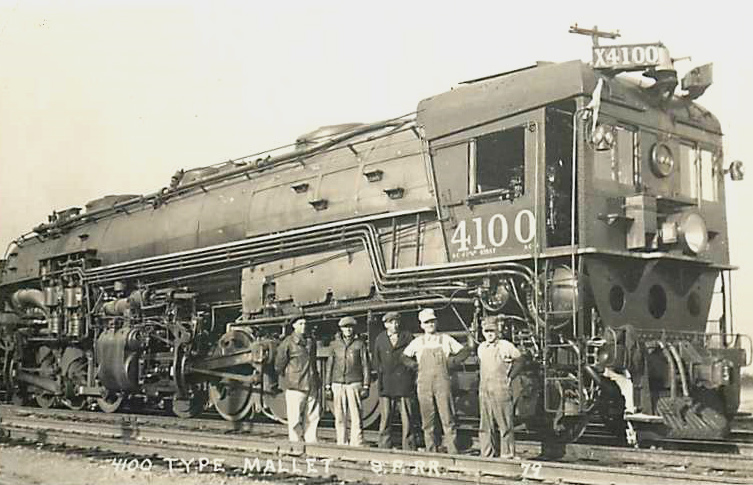
- Southern Pacific 4100 and its crew
Type and origin
- Power type: Steam
- Builder: Baldwin Locomotive Works
- Serial number: 60575, 60576, 60623-60625, 60666-60669
- Build date: August–October 1928
Specifications
- Configuration
  - Whyte: 4-8-8-2
- Gauge: 4 ft 8 1/2 in (1,435 mm) standard gauge
- Driver dia.: 63 in (1,600 mm)
- Adhesive weight: 475,200 lb (215,500 kg; 215.5 t)
- Loco weight: 614,600 lb (278,800 kg; 278.8 t)
- Boiler pressure: 235 psi (1.62 MPa)
- Feedwater heater: 4 1/4-BL Worthington
- Cylinder size: 24 in × 32 in (610 mm × 813 mm) (bore × stroke)
Performance figures
- Tractive effort: 112,760 lbf (501.6 kN), 116,900 lbf (520 kN) rebuilt
Career
- Operators: Southern Pacific Railroad
- Class: AC-4
- Number in class: 10
- Numbers: 4100 – 4109
- First run: October 1928
- Disposition: All scrapped

Southern Pacific Railroad's AC-4 (meaning Articulated Consolidation) class of steam locomotives was the first class of 4-8-8-2 cab forward locomotives. They were intended to improve on the railroad's MC (Mallet-Consolidation) class 2-8-8-2 locomotives with a larger firebox, hence, the four-wheel leading truck (instead of the two-wheel).

The AC-4s were the first SP Mallets built for simple expansion. Baldwin Locomotive Works built them in August through October 1928 with a maximum cutoff of 70%, so tractive effort was rated at 112,760 lbf (501.6 kN); a few years later, limited cutoff was dropped and calculated tractive effort increased to 116,000 lbf (520 kN).

The AC-4s were removed from service starting in 1953, and all ten were scrapped by June 1955.
