= 4-8-8-2 =

Articulated locomotive wheel arrangement

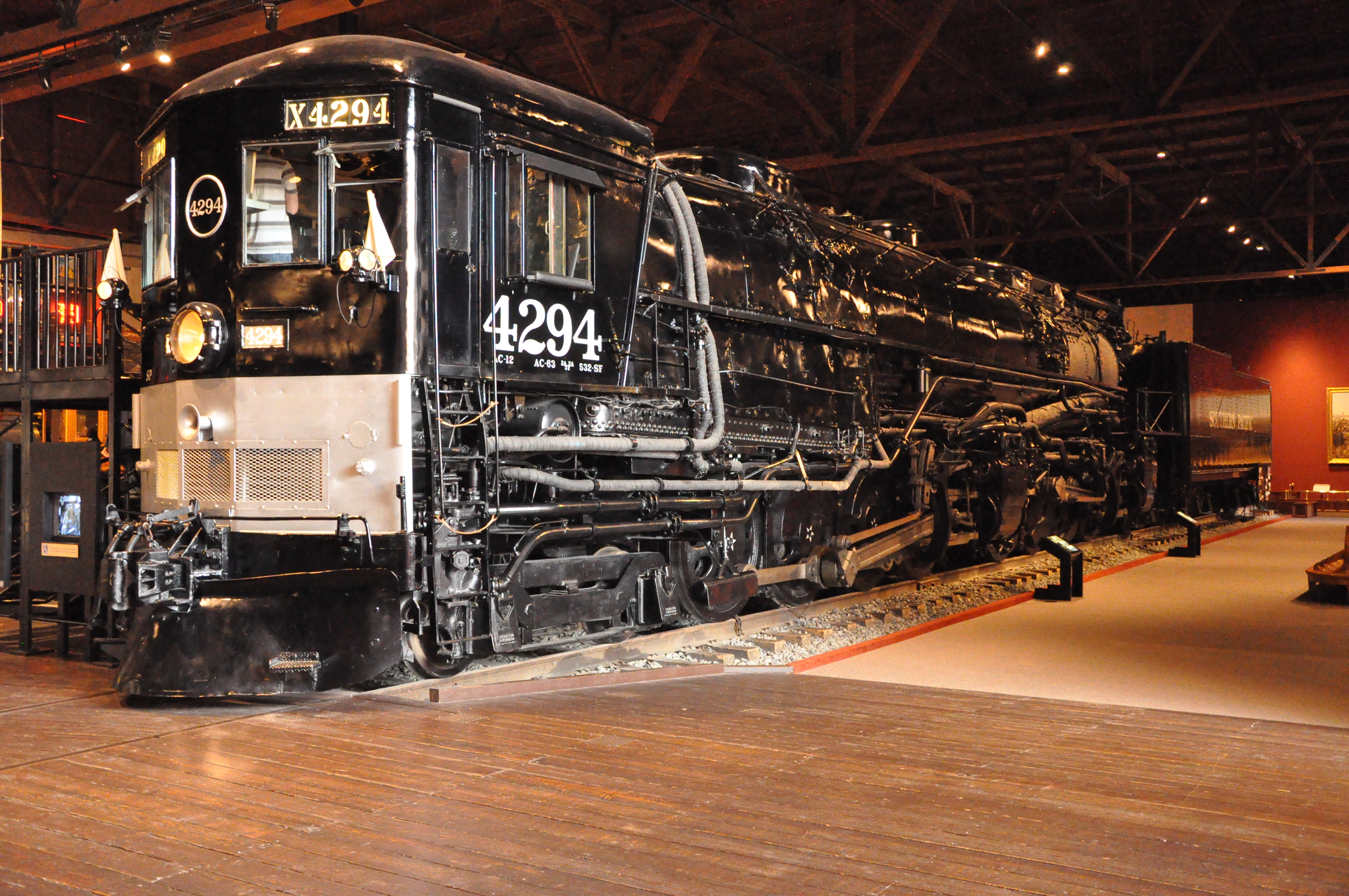
Southern Pacific 4294, preserved at the California State Railroad Museum in Sacramento, California

4-8-8-2 wheel arrangement

Under the Whyte notation for the classification of steam locomotives, a 4-8-8-2 is a locomotive with four leading wheels, two sets of eight driving wheels, and a two-wheel trailing truck.

Other equivalent classifications are:
UIC classification: 2DD1 (also known as German classification and Italian classification)
French classification: 240+041
Turkish classification: 46+45
Swiss classification: 4/6+4/5

The equivalent UIC classification is refined to (2'D)D1' for simple articulated locomotives.

A locomotive of that length must be an articulated locomotive; meaning all have a joint between the first and second groups of driving wheels. All examples of this type are cab forwards. Normally, the leading truck sits under the smokebox and the trailing truck under the firebox. On a cab-forward, the leading truck supports the firebox and the trailing truck and smokebox are at the rear next to the tender. A 4-8-8-2 is effectively a 2-8-8-4 that always runs in reverse.

== Southern Pacific ==
The Southern Pacific was the only railroad to operate engines of this wheel arrangement, all of which were built by the Baldwin Locomotive Works. A total of 195 were produced between 1928 and 1944 in eight batches. The later ones had cylinders 24 inches by 32 inches, drivers 63-1/2 inches and boiler pressures of 250 psi, giving a calculated tractive effort of 123,400 lb.

The locomotives were built as cab-forwards to protect engine crews from exhaust smoke and heat in the many tunnels and snow sheds that were part of their usual routes. Although commonly called Mallets these cab-forwards were built with simple expansion cylinders. The name stuck because the original classes of Southern Pacific cab-forwards were built as compound Mallets, though these were eventually converted to simple expansion machines.

Currently, Southern Pacific 4294 is the only existing 4-8-8-2 locomotive in the world, and the only cab forward to be preserved after being withdrawn from service. It was donated to the City of Sacramento, California in 1958, but had to be moved due to freeway construction. It was given to the State of California and is on indoor static display at the California State Railroad Museum in Sacramento.
