= Steam railcar =

Self-propelled railcar powered by a steam engine

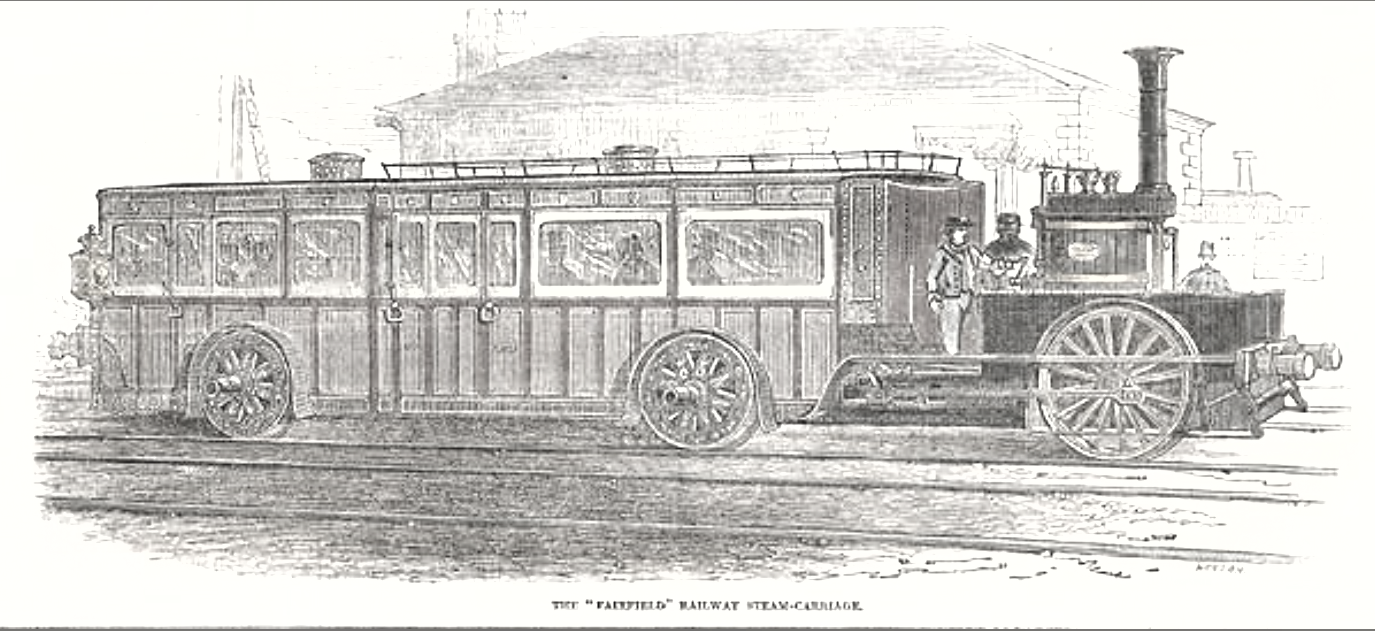
First Railmotor. Built by Fairfield Works, Bow, London, to design by William Bridges Adams

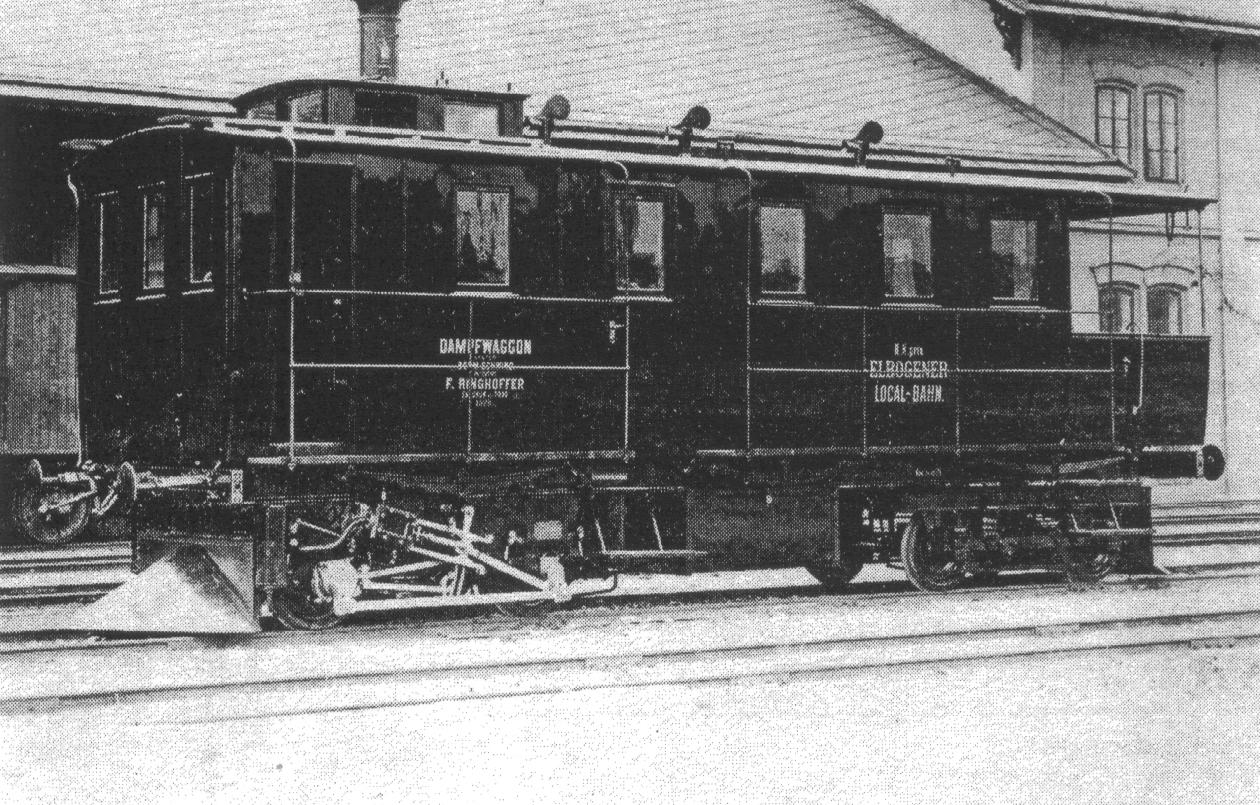
A steam railcar built in 1880 by Ringhoffer of Prague

A steam railcar, steam motor car (US), or Railmotor (UK) is a railcar that is self powered by a steam engine. The first steam railcar was an experimental unit designed and built in 1847 by James Samuel and William Bridges Adams in Britain. In 1848 they made the Fairfield steam carriage that they sold to the Bristol & Exeter Railway, who used it for two years on a branch line.

== Origins ==
The first steam railcar was designed by James Samuel, the Eastern Counties Railway Locomotive Engineer, built by William Bridges Adams in 1847, and trialled between Shoreditch and Cambridge on 23 October 1847. An experimental unit, 12 feet 6 inches (3.81 m) long with a small vertical boiler and passenger accommodation was a bench seat around a box at the back. The following year Samuel and Adams built the Fairfield steam carriage. This was much larger, 31 feet 6 inches (9.60 m) long, and built with an open third class section and a closed second class section. After trials in 1848, it was sold to the Bristol and Exeter Railway and ran for two years on the Tiverton branch.

== History by country ==
=== Argentina ===
In 1905, the Buenos Aires Great Southern Railway purchased a steam railcar from Kerr, Stuart and Company. Birmingham Railway Carriage and Wagon Company supplied a twin-car unit with an oil-fired boiler in 1931 to the Entre Ríos Railway.

=== Australia ===
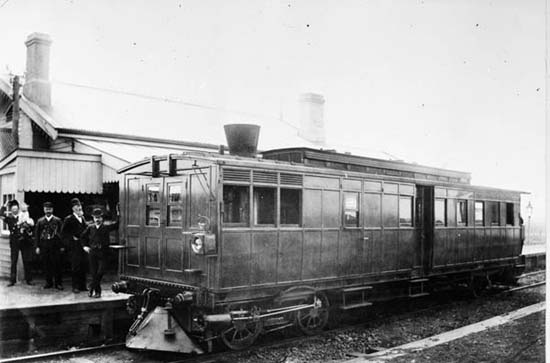
Rowan steam railmotor.

In 1883, the Victorian Railways purchased the Rowan steam railmotor. Two double-decker units were imported from Belgium by the South Australian Railways in 1895.

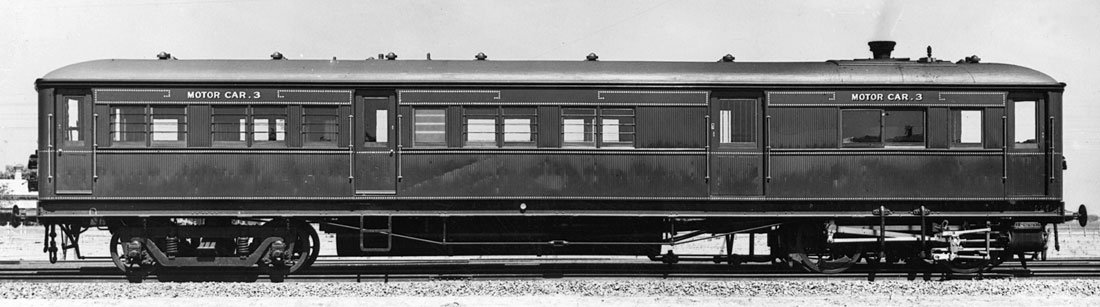
Kerr Stuart steam railmotor in 1913

In 1913, Kerr, Stuart and Company built a boiler, shipped it to Australia and the Victorian Railways assembled the Kerr Stuart steam railmotor.

=== Austria–Hungary ===
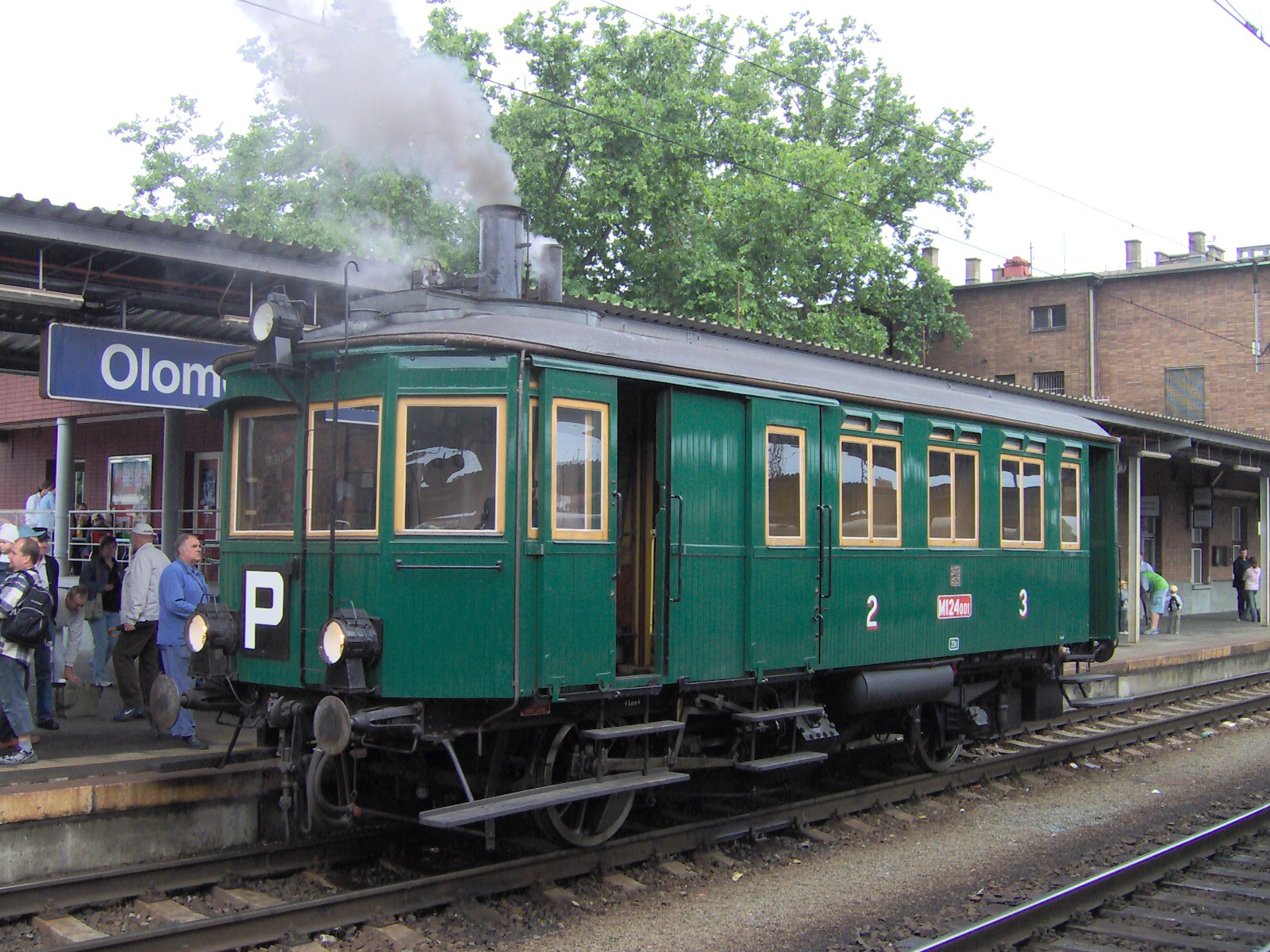
A Komarek/Ringhoffer steam railcar at the Czech Railway Museum

In 1880, Ringhoffer of Prague built a steam railcar for the Österreichische Lokaleisenbahngesellschaft (Austrian local railway). With 32 seats and a maximum speed of 18 kilometres per hour (11 mph), it had been withdrawn by 1900. In the early 20th century, the Imperial Royal Austrian State Railways ordered a railcar with a Serpollet boiler from Esslingen, followed by a number of cars with boilers from Komarek of Vienna and carriages from Ringhoffer. The Niederösterreichische Landesbahnen (Lower Austrian State Railway) also bought cars made by Komarek and Rohrbacher. Most cars had been withdrawn by the end of World War I, and those that remained when Austria-Hungary was divided in 1918 were divided between the Czechoslovak State Railways and the Austrian Federal Railways. All units having been withdrawn by the end of the 1950s, as of 2012 one car is preserved in operational condition at the Czech Railway Museum in Lužná (Rakovník District).

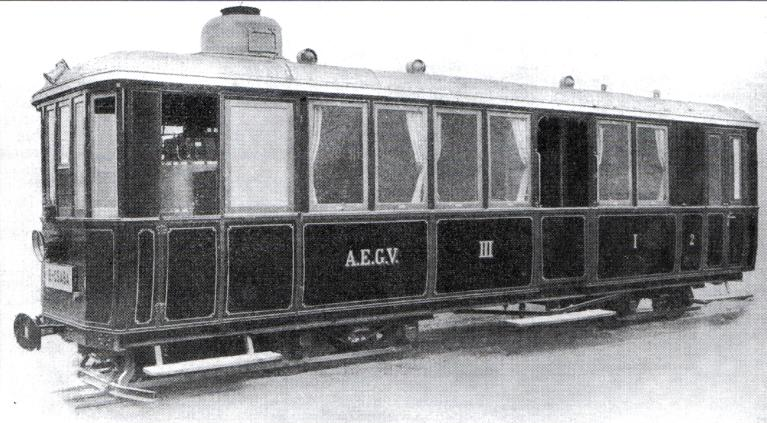
The first steam railcar built by Ganz and de Dion-Bouton

Between 1901 and 1908, Ganz Works of Budapest and de Dion-Bouton of Paris collaborated to build a number of railcars for the Hungarian State Railways together with units with de Dion-Bouton boilers, Ganz steam motors and equipments, and Raba carriages built by the Raba Hungarian Wagon and Machine Factory in Győr. In 1908, the Borzsavölgyi Gazdasági Vasút (BGV), a narrow-gauge railway in Carpathian Ruthenia (today's Ukraine), purchased five railcars from Ganz and four railcars from the Hungarian Royal State Railway Machine Factory with de Dion-Bouton boilers. The Ganz company started to export steam motor railcars to the United Kingdom, Italy, Canada, Japan, Russia and Bulgaria.

=== Brazil ===
In 1928, the Leopoldina Railway purchased a steam railcar for inspection services by Sentinel Waggon Works.

=== Britain ===
Steam railcars to be built in Britain in the early 20th century for the London and South Western Railway (L&SWR) and before entering passenger service one was lent to the Great Western Railway (GWR) for a trial run in the Stroud Valley between Chalford and Stonehouse in Gloucestershire. Between 1902 and 1911, 197 steam railcars were built, 99 by the GWR.

Introduced either due to competition from the new electric tramways or to provide an economic service on lightly used country branch lines, there were two main designs, either a powered bogie enclosed in a rigid body or an articulated engine unit and carriage, pivoting on a pin. However, with little reserve power steam railcars were inflexible and the ride quality was poor due to excessive vibration and oscillation. Most were replaced by an autotrain, adapted carriages and a push-pull steam locomotive as these were able to haul additional carriages or goods wagons.

After trials in 1924, the London and North Eastern Railway purchased three types of steam railcars from Sentinel-Cammell and Claytons.

British steam railcars
Railway	Number of railcars	Introduced	Withdrawn	
Bristol and Exeter Railway	1	1848	1850	
Joint; London, Brighton and South Coast Railway and London & South Western Railway	2	1902	1919	
Great Western Railway	99	1903-08	1935 (many were converted to auto-trailers)	GWR steam rail motors
Taff Vale Railway	18	1903-06	early 1920s	Taff Vale steam railmotor
Alexandra (Newport and South Wales) Docks and Railway	2	1904	1911; 1917	
Midland Railway	1	1904	1912? (Note: The unit worked the Morecambe and Heysham branch and was returned to Derby works when this line was electrified in 1908.)	
Glasgow and South Western Railway	2	1904–5	1915–16	
London and South Western Railway	15	1904-06	1916-19	
Lancashire and Yorkshire Railway	18	1905-11	1927-48	L&YR railmotors
Great Central Railway	3	1904–5	1914	
South Eastern and Chatham Railway	8	1904-5	1914	
Barry Railway	2	1905	1914 (Note: They were de-engined and converted to bogie open composite carriages according diagram 14.)	
North Staffordshire Railway	3	1905	1922	
London, Brighton and South Coast Railway	2	1905	1909	
Furness Railway	2	1905	1914	
Great North of Scotland Railway	2	1905	1909–10	
Great Northern Railway	6	1905	1925-6	
London and North Western Railway	6	1905-07	1948	L&NWR railcar at Bicester Town
Isle of Wight Railway	1	1906	1912	
Port Talbot Railway	1	1907	1920 (Note: Sold to the Port of London Authority for use on the Millwall Extension Railway.)	
Rhymney Railway	2	1907	1909; 1919	
Cardiff Railway	2 (Note: A spare engine allowed for maintenance.)	1911	1917	
Nidd Valley Light Railway	1	1920 (Note: Purchased from the GWR.)	1937	
Millwall Extension Railway	3	1920 (Note: Two were bought from the GWR and one from the Port Talbot Railway)	1926	
London and North Eastern Railway	81	1924	1947	LNER Sentinel–Cammell steam railcar
London, Midland and Scottish	14	1925-27	1947	
Cheshire Lines Railway	4	1929	1944	
Axholme Joint Railway	1	1930	1944	
Southern Railway	1	1933	1936	

=== Egypt ===
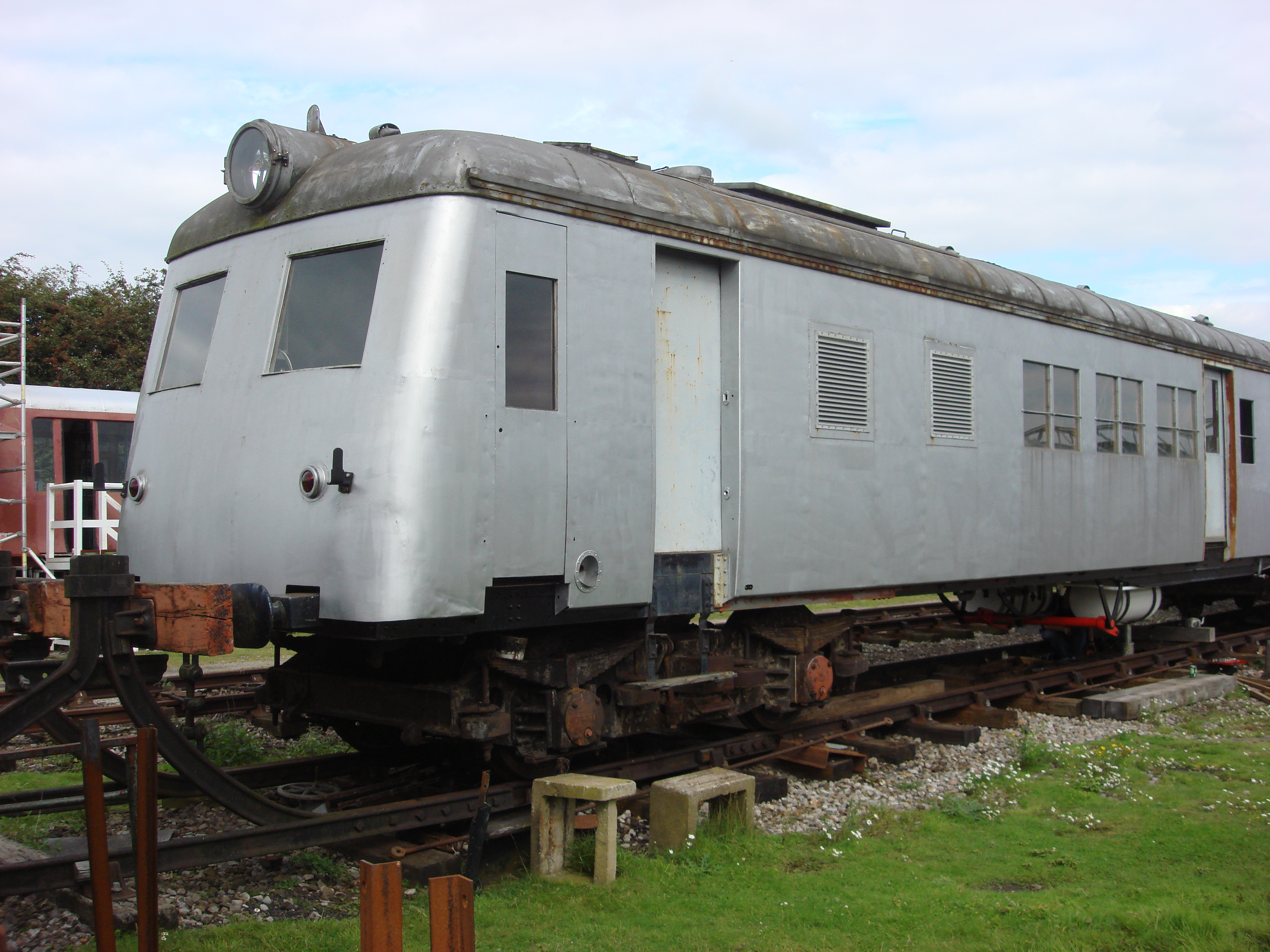
Sentinel-Cammell railcar at the Buckinghamshire Railway Centre

Experiments with a steam railcar in 1926 led to the acquisition of many examples of this type of vehicle by the Egyptian State Railways. Clayton Wagons supplied six twin-car units in 1928. Birmingham Railway Carriage and Wagon Company 13 similar vehicles in 1930. Sentinel and Metro-Cammell supplied ten twin-car units in 1934.

In 1951, Sentinel and Metro-Cammell built ten 3-car steam railcar units for the Egyptian National Railways. The units were articulated, with an oil-fired boiler supplying steam to two 6-cylinder steam motors. Withdrawn from service in 1962, as of 2012 one unit is under restoration at the Buckinghamshire Railway Centre.

=== France ===
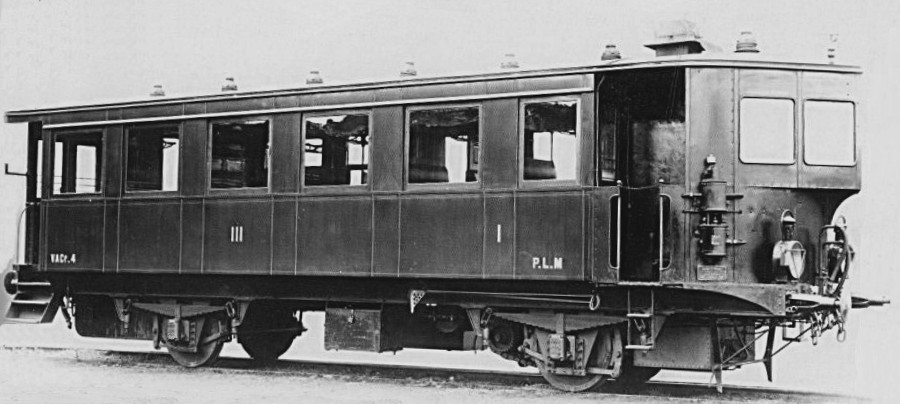
A steam railcar built c. 1905 by Valentin Purrey for Chemins de fer de Paris à Lyon et à la Méditerranée (PLM)

At the beginning of the 20th century Société Valentin Purrey patented a steam engine that was used in railcars. Built in Bordeaux by 1903 fifty cars had been built, including 40 to the Compagnie Générale des Omnibus-Paris. Also, Buffaud & Robatel built a steam railcar for the metre gauge Chemin de fer de Kayes au Niger in Mali.

=== Germany ===
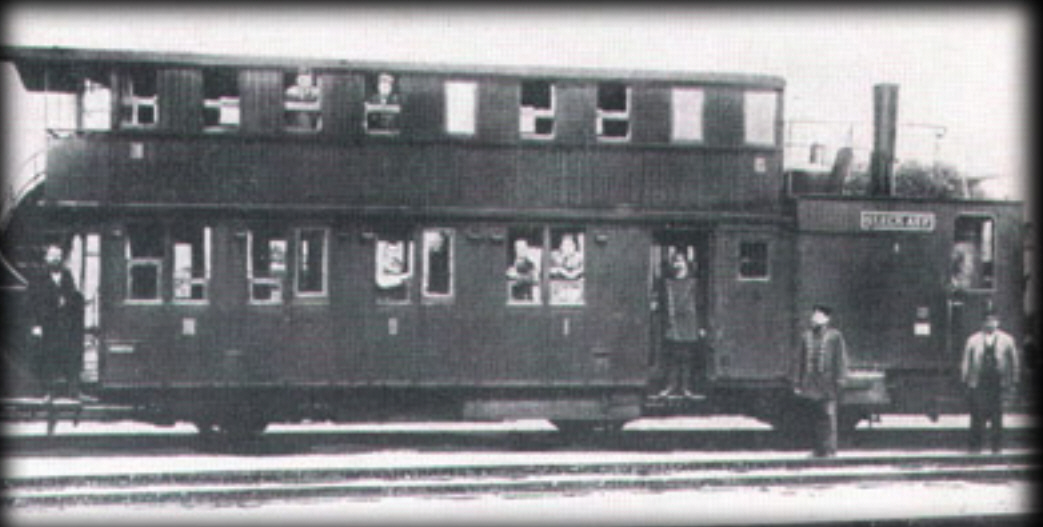
"Glück auf", a double-decker steam railcar designed by Georg Thomas

In 1879, Georg Thomas of the Hessian Ludwig Railway developed a double-decker steam railcar, for which he was granted a patent in 1881. The three-axle vehicle consisted of a single-axle engine unit and a two-axle double-deck carriage part, rigidly coupled together and separable only in the workshop. The Hessian Ludwig Railway built three in 1879–80, followed by the Royal Saxon State Railways, the Oels-Gniezno Railway and the Royal Württemberg State Railways. The Royal Bavarian State Railways built a similar Bavarian MCi in 1882. All had been withdrawn in the early 20th century.

In 1895, the Royal Württemberg State Railways ordered a steam railcar using a Serpollet boiler from Esslingen, followed by six more. At first, their performance was unsatisfactory, until Eugen Kittel of the Württemberg State Railways developed a new firebox. Seventeen were built for the Württemberg State Railways and railcars were also made for the Royal Saxon State Railways, Swiss Northeastern Railway and Imperial Royal Austrian State Railways, and the Grand Duchy of Baden State Railway in 1914–15.

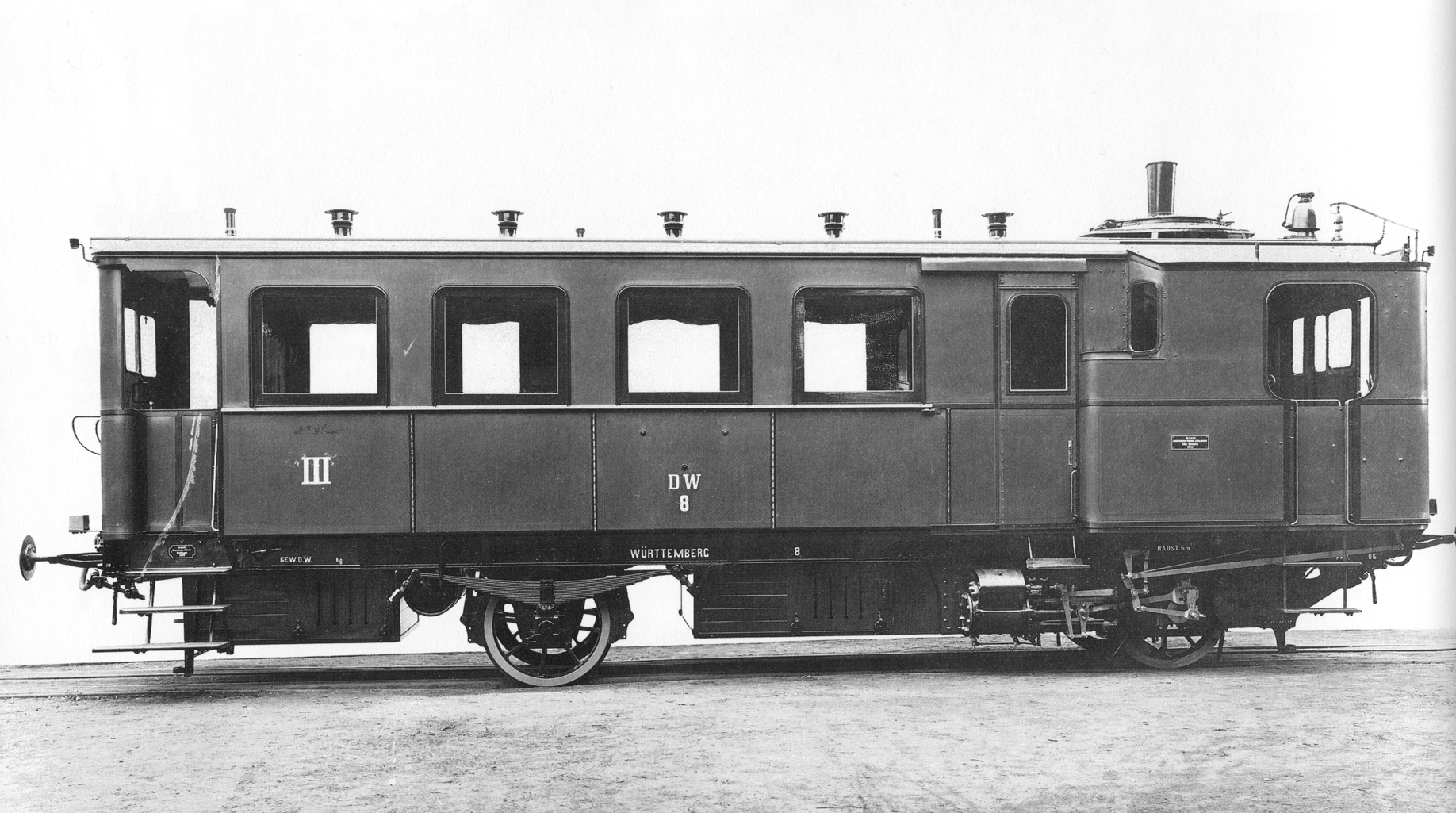
A steam railcar built by Esslingen in 1905 for the Royal Württemberg State Railways

In 1918, the Austrian State Railways unit passed to the Czechoslovak State Railways after Austria-Hungary was divided at the end of World War I. At the end of World War II units were divided between the Deutsche Reichsbahn of East Germany, Deutsche Bundesbahn of West Germany and SNCF of France and all units had been withdrawn by 1953.

In 1906, the Prussian state railways bought two steam railcars, one fired by coal and the other oil, from Hannoversche Maschinenbau AG.

Seven Bavarian MCCi units were built between 1906 and 1908 for the Royal Bavarian State Railways for suburban services in the Munich area, the coach bodies being manufactured by MAN and the engines by Maffei. These had all been withdrawn by the end of the 1920s.

A steam railcar, DR 59, was built by Wismar in 1937 to reduce the dependency on imported diesel or petrol. After the war ownership of the car passed to the Deutsche Reichsbahn of East Germany, and in 1959 was converted into a driving trailer and withdrawn in 1975.

=== India ===
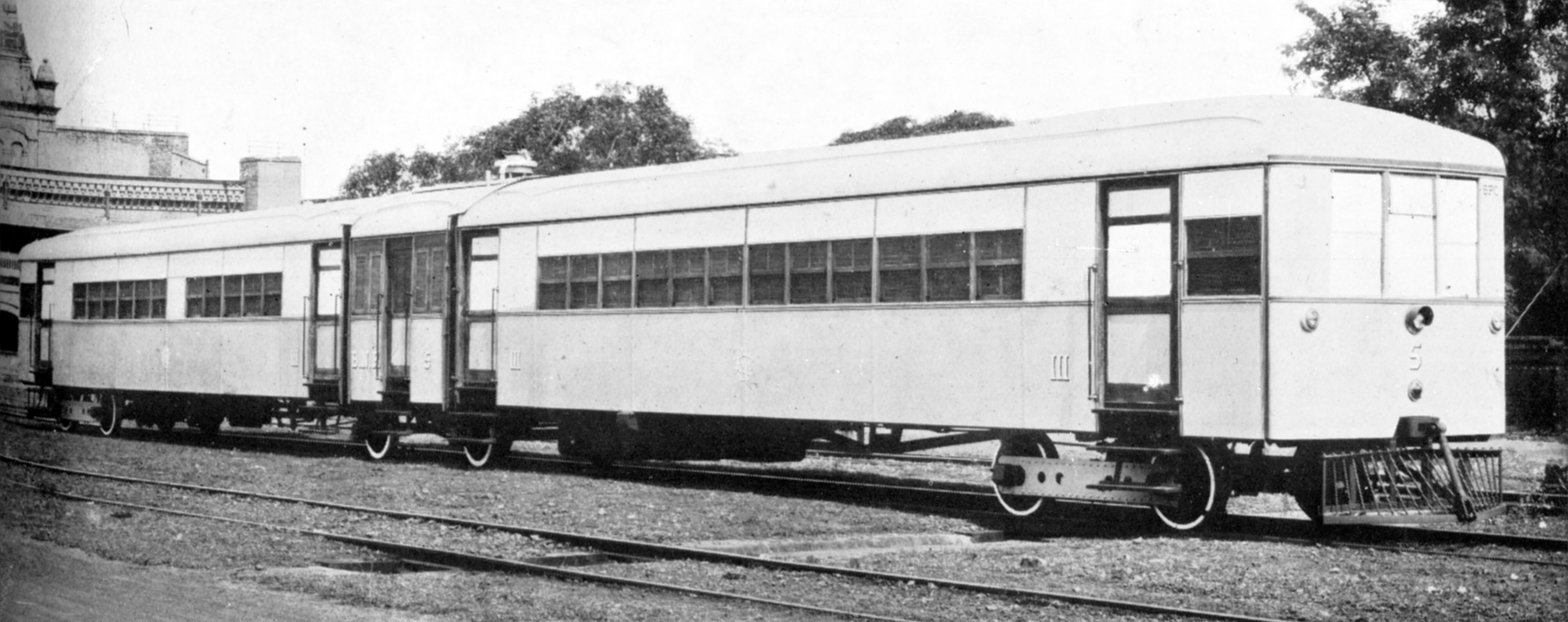
Articulated Sentinel-Cammell steam railcar for Bengal Nagpur Railway

The Great Indian Peninsula Railway bought one steam railcar in 1906 from Kerr, Stuart and Company. In 1906, the North Western State Railway purchased a steam motor coach from Vulcan Foundry and in 1907 the East Indian Railway bought five steam railcars from Nasmyth, Wilson and Company. In 1925, Sentinel and Metro-Cammell built five twin-car units for the Bengal Nagpur Railway.

=== Italy ===
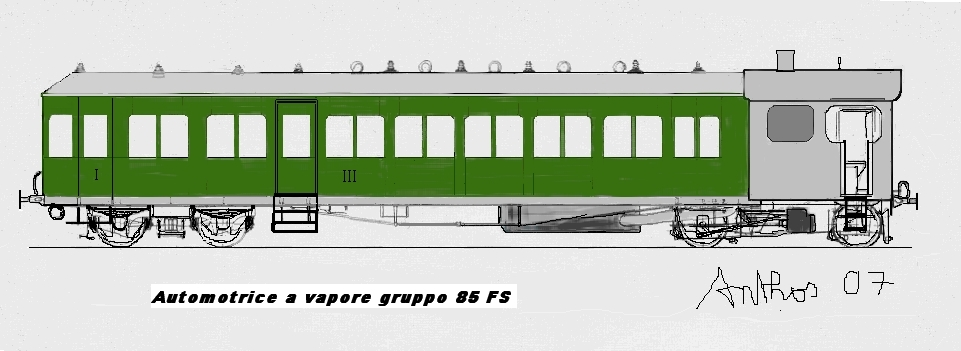
Italian class FS 85 steam railcar

In 1904, two steam railcars were ordered from Purrey; classified as FS 80 these were withdrawn in 1913. Sixty-five railcars, classified as FS 60, were purchased in 1905 to 1907, but found to be under-powered and sixteen were converted into locomotives. At the 1906 Milan Fair an FS 85 (it) was exhibited and three were purchased by Kerr, Stuart and Company, followed by 12 also British built FS 86 (it).

In 1938, three railcars using high-pressure steam were purchased and classified ALv 72 (it). These were sold to Ferrovie Padane in 1940 and converted into passenger coaches.

=== Japan ===
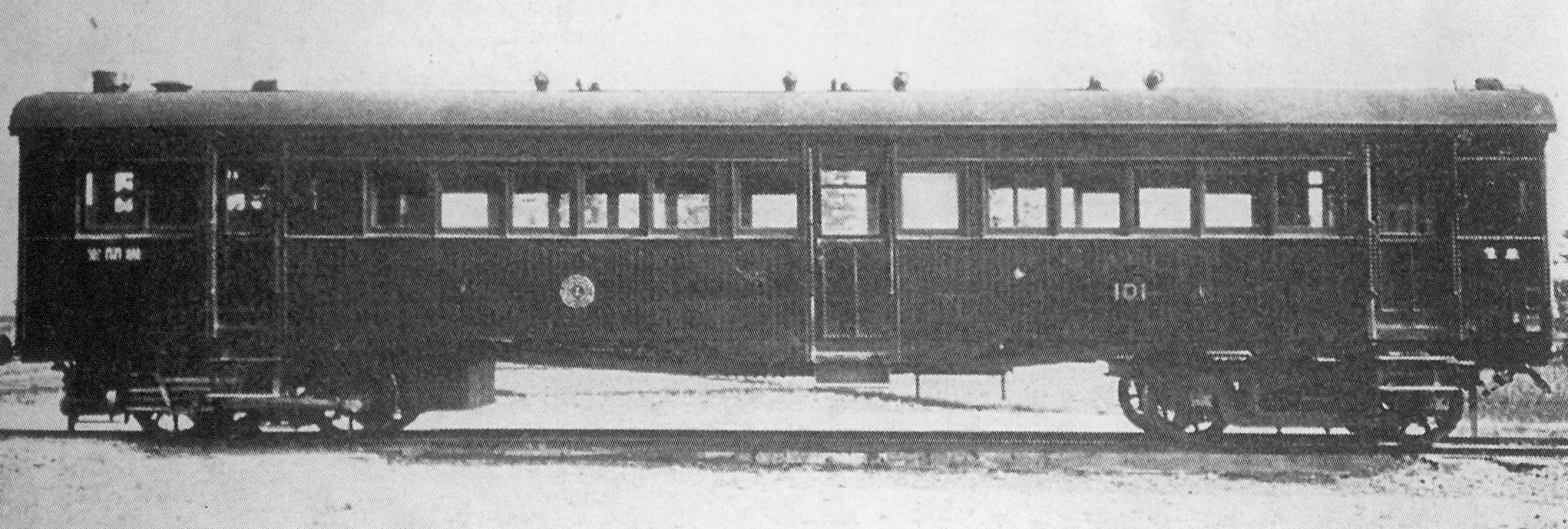
Mikawa Railway (Japan) steam railcar

The Japanese Government Railways had several steam railcars in their employ before experimenting with petrol and diesel cars.

=== Mali ===
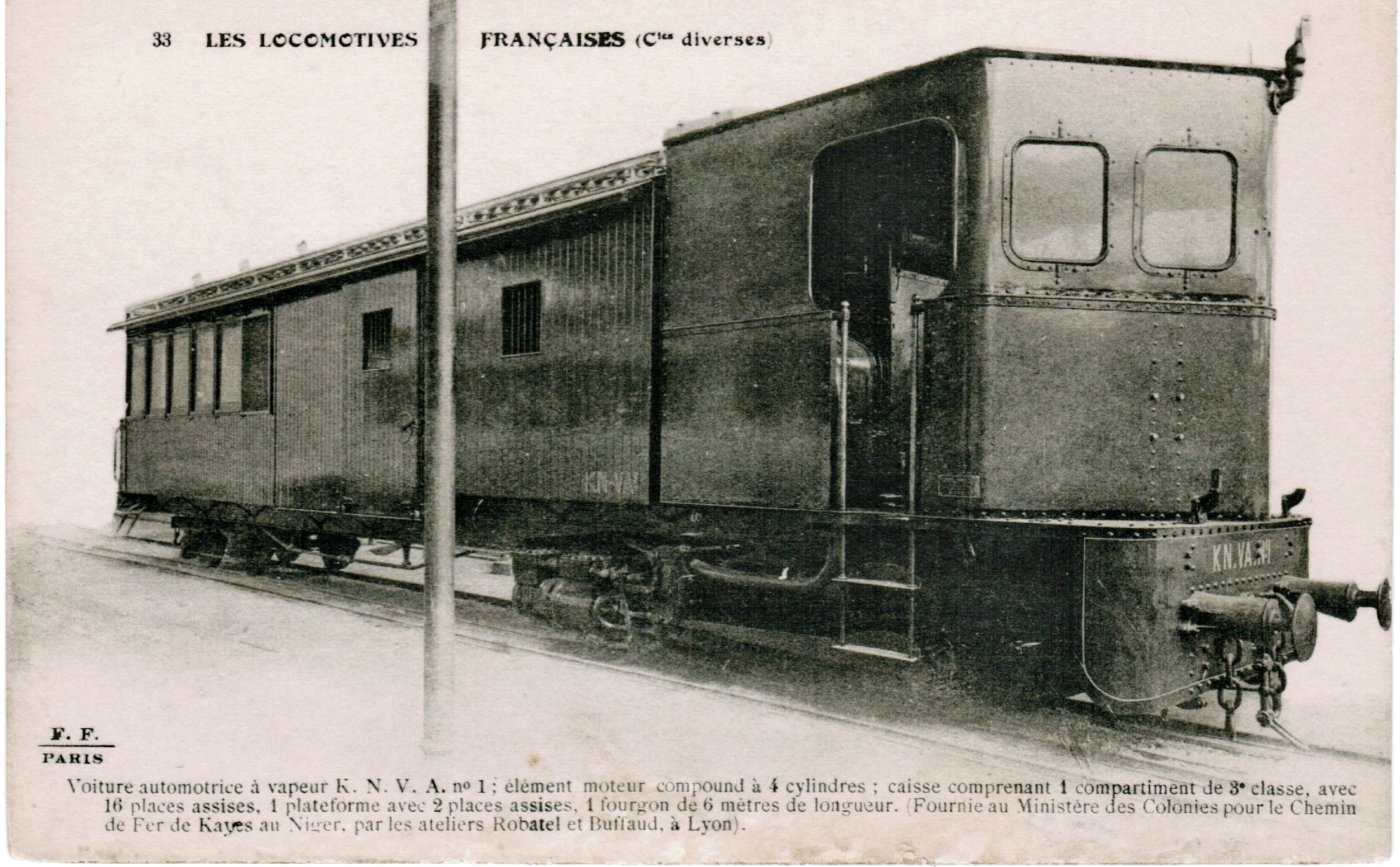

French manufacturers Buffaud & Robatel built a steam railcar for the metre gauge Chemin de fer de Kayes au Niger in Mali.

=== Mauritius ===
In 1907, the Mauritius Government Railways purchased a steam railcar from Kerr, Stuart and Company.

=== Namibia ===
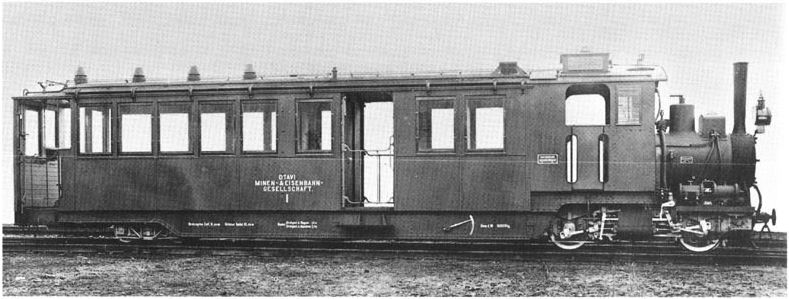
Steam railcar supplied to the Otavi Railway

In 1907, the Otavi Mining and Railway Company in German South West Africa (today's Namibia) purchased two steam railcars built by MAN SE in cooperation with Maffei for 600 mm gauge.

=== New Zealand ===
In 1925 and 1926, two steam railcars were supplied to New Zealand Railways Department, one from Sentinel and Cammell and the other from Claytons. They were both withdrawn after a few years.

=== Nigeria ===
The Nigerian Railways purchased several 3-car steam railcar units in 1954 from Metro-Cammell. The units were articulated, with an oil-fired boiler supplying steam.

=== North America ===
In North America, a railcar is known as a Doodlebug and the steam railcar as a steam motor car. The New England Railroad purchased a steam motor car by Schenectady Locomotive Works in 1897. In 1906, the Canadian Pacific Railway had an oil fired steam railcar and in 1908 the Chicago, Rock Island and Pacific Railroad purchased one by Alco-Schenectady.

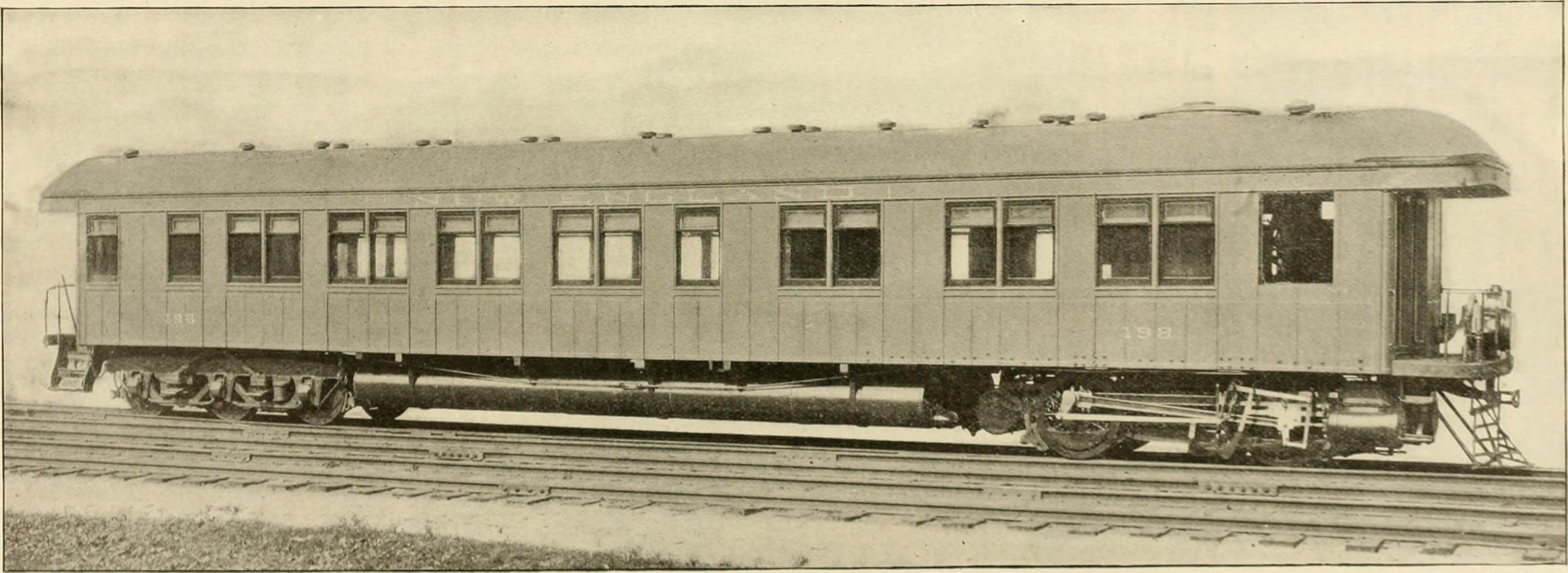
A steam motor car on the New England Railroad in 1897.

In 1911, the Atchison, Topeka and Santa Fe Railway built a steam-powered railcar combining a Jacobs-Schupert boiler and a Ganz Works power truck in an American Car and Foundry body. The resulting doodlebug was designated M-104. It operated experimentally under its own power for only three months. With the steam machinery removed and an unpowered bogie truck substituted, the car operated as an unpowered combine (combination baggage-coach car) until the 1960s.

The steam motor cars in North America reached their popular apex before the 1880s, with most fabricated to custom designs by small specialty builders before 1875. nearly all examples were unique and purpose-built to order; a few were experimental cars built and marketed by small firms or individuals on a trial basis and often not entirely successful due to their uniqueness or relative costs. The rise of electric traction was one cause for the ultimate demise of American steam motor cars.

=== Portugal ===
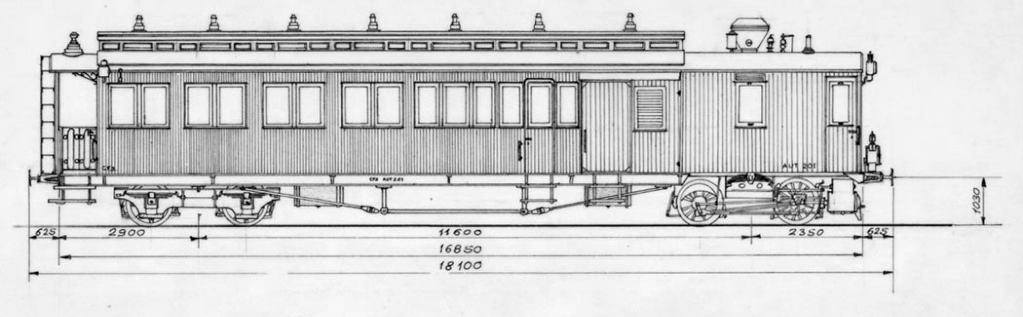
Portuguese steam railcar from Borsig

In 1906, the Portuguese Railway Company purchased two steam railcars from Borsig.

=== South Africa ===
There were a total of three steam railcars in South Africa, all imported from Britain and all running on the Cape gauge of 1,067 mm common there.

=== Sudan ===
The Sudan Government Railways bought two steam railcars from Clayton Wagons in 1929.

=== Sweden ===
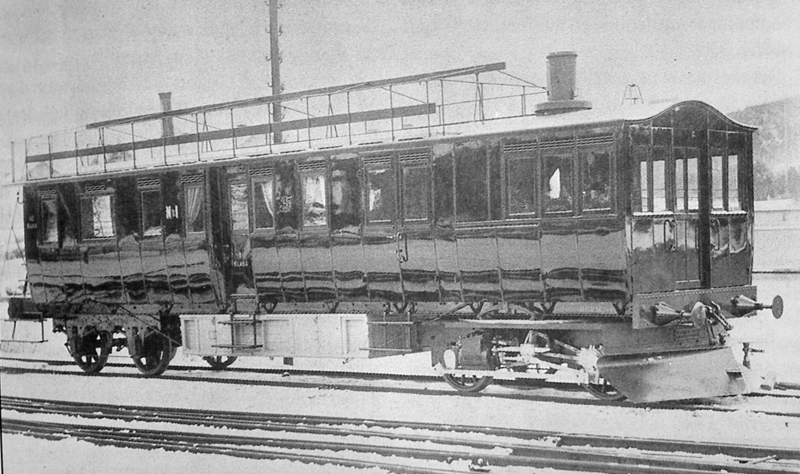
Swedish steam railcar of the 1880s

Steam railcars were used in Sweden in the 1880s.

=== Switzerland ===
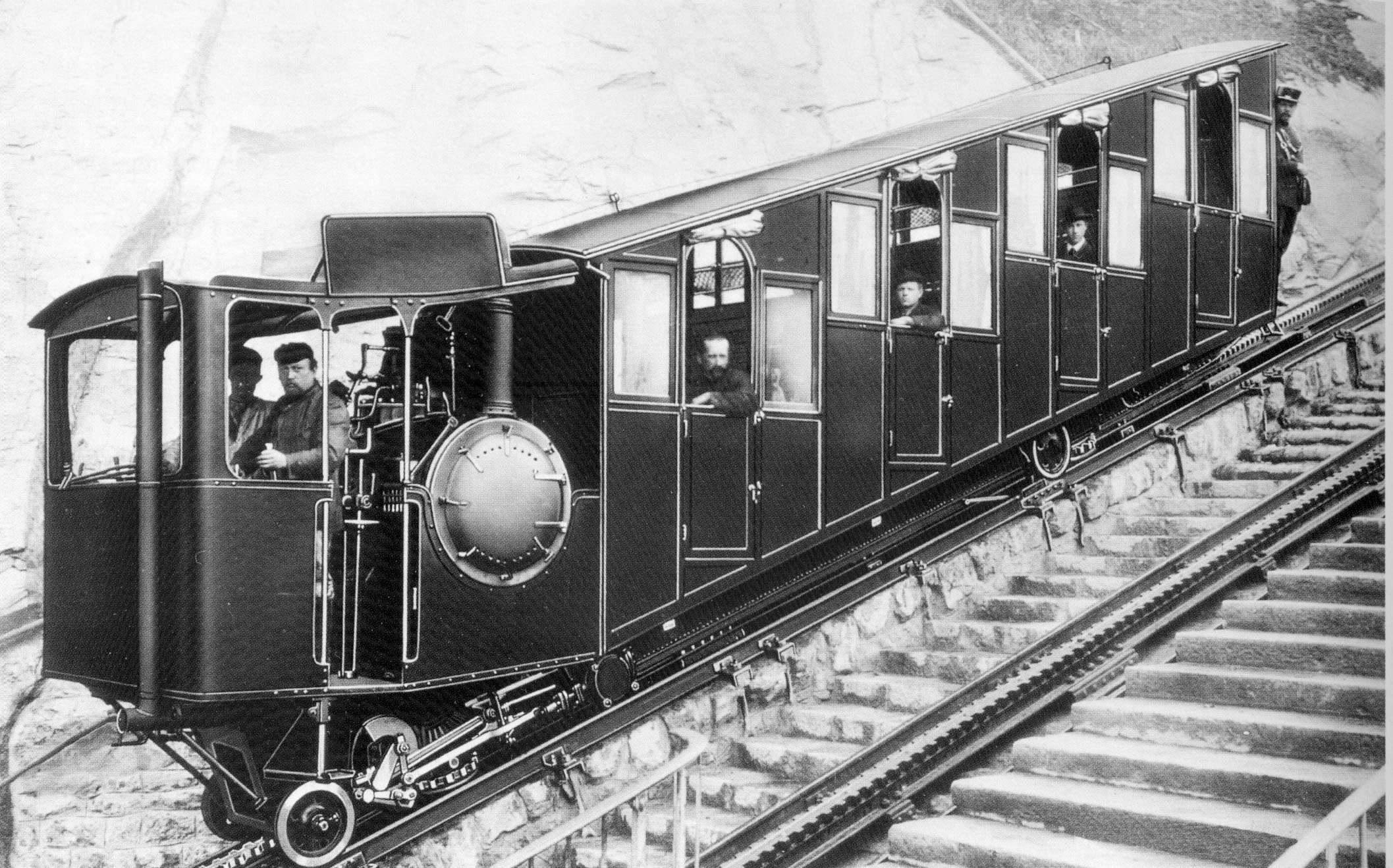
A railcar on the Pilatus Railway

In 1889, steam railcars were built for the Pilatus Railway, a rack railway in Switzerland with a maximum gradient of 48%.

Cars Nos. 1-9 were built by the Swiss Locomotive and Machine Works in Winterthur, followed by No. 10 in 1900 and no. 11 in 1909. The railway was electrified in 1937, and the cars scrapped except for two. Car no. 9 remained until 1981 as a reserve and has since been in the Swiss Transport Museum in Lucerne. Car no. 10 is on permanent loan to the Deutsches Museum in Munich.

In 1902, a steam railcar was built by Maschinenfabrik Esslingen. Not a success, it was rebuilt in 1907 and sold to the Uerikon Bauma Railway. The railcar was withdrawn in 1950 and as of 2012 the railcar is restored.

=== Trinidad and Tobago ===
The Trinidad Government Railway purchased two steam railcars secondhand from the London, Brighton and South Coast Railway in 1921, but they have never been put in operation. One of the coach parts was converted into the Governor's saloon and the other into a second class carriage. In 1931, a Sentinel-Cammell twin articulated steam railcar was acquired.

== Notes and references ==
=== Sources and further reading ===
Britain

- Hedges, Martin, ed. (1980). 150 Years of British Railways. Hamlyn. ISBN 0-600-37655-9.
- Jenkinson, David (1996). History of British Railway Carriages, 1900–53. Atlantic Transport. ISBN 978-1899816033.
- Rush, R.W (1971). British Steam Railcars. Oakwood Press. ISBN 0-85361-144-0.
- Tufnell, R.M. (1984). The British Railcar: AEC to HST. David and Charles. ISBN 0-7153-8529-1.

Austria-Hungary

The following books are in German

- Adolph Giesl-Gieslingen (1981). Aera nach Golsdorf: Die letzten drei jahrzehnte des osterreichischen Dampflokomotivhaus. Slezak. ISBN 978-3-900134-37-2.
- Alfred Horn; Wilhelm Urbanczik (1972). Dampftriebwagen und Gepäcklokomotiven in Österreich, Ungarn, der Tschechoslowakei und Jugoslawien. Bohmann. ISBN 978-3-7002-0309-4.
- Dieter Bäzold, Rolf Löttgers, Günther Scheingraber u. a.: Preußen-Report, Band 9: Zahnrad- und Schmalspurlokomotiven, Triebwagen. Eisenbahn-Journal, Hermann Merker Verlag, Fürstenfeldbruck 1996 Modelleisenbahner Nr. 4: Preußische Dampftriebwagen der Bauart Stoltz, April 1988, S. 17–20
- Dieter Zoubek (2004). Erhaltene Dampflokomotiven in und aus Österreich 2004. Zoubek, Dieter. ISBN 978-3-200-00174-9.
- Helmut Griebel; Josef Otto Slezak; Hans Sternhardt (1 December 1985). BBÖ Lokomotiv-Chronik 1923–1938. Slezak. ISBN 978-3-85416-026-7.
- Johann Blieberger; Josef Pospichal (2011). Enzyklopädie der kkStB-Triebfahrzeuge, Band 4: Die Reihen 83 bis 100, Schmalspur- und nicht mit Dampf betriebene Bauarten. bahnmedien.at. ISBN 978-3-9502648-8-3.
- Friedrich Slezak; Josef Otto Slezak (1981). Vom Schiffskanal zur Eisenbahn: Wiener Neustädter kanal and Aspangbahn. Verlag Josef Otto Slezak. ISBN 978-3-900134-72-3.
- Verzeichnis der Lokomotiven, Tender, Wasserwagen und Triebwagen der k. k. österreichischen Staatsbahnen und der vom Staate betriebenen Privatbahnen nach dem Stande vom 30. Juni 1917, 14. Auflage, Verlag der k. k. österreichischen Staatsbahnen, Wien, 1918

The following books are in Czech

- Karel Beneš (1995). Železnice na Podkarpatské Rusi. Nakl. dopravy a turistiky. ISBN 978-80-85884-32-6.
- Karel Just (2001). Parní lokomotivy na úzkorozchodných tratích ČSD. Vydavatelství dopravní literatury Luděk Čada. ISBN 978-80-902706-5-7.

The following books are in Hungarian

- Ernő Lányi (1984). Nagyvasúti vontatójárművek Magyarországon. Közlekedési Dokumentációs Vállalat. ISBN 978-963-552-161-6.
- Villányi György (1996). Gőzmotorkocsik és kismozdonyok. Magyar Államvasutak Rt.

Germany

These sources are in German

- Peter Henkel (1985). "Der Dampftriebwagen nach Thomas". Die Bahn und Ihre Geschichte = Schriftenreihe des Landkreises Darmstadt-Dieburg 2. Darmstadt: Georg Wittenberger / Förderkreis Museen und Denkmalpflege Darmstadt-Dieburg).
- Deutsche Reichsbahn (1935). Hundert Jahre deutsche Eisenbahnen. Jubiläumsschrift zum hundertjährigen Bestehen der deutschen Eisenbahnen.
- Lutz Uebel; Wolfgang Richter (1994). MAN – 150 Jahre Schienenfahrzeuge aus Nürnberg.
- Peter Zander (1989). "Doppelstöckige Dampftriebwagen der Bauart Thomas". Modell Eisenbahner. Eisenbahn-Modellbahn-Zeitschrift.
- Hermann Lohr (1988). Lokomotiv Archiv Württemberg. Transpress. ISBN 978-3-344-00222-0.
- Hermann Lohr (1988). Lokomotiv Archiv Baden. Transpress. ISBN 978-3-344-00210-7.
- Wolfgang Valtin (1992). Verzeichnis aller Lokomotiven und Triebwagen: Dampflokomotiven und Dampftriebwagen. Transpress. ISBN 978-3-344-70740-8.
- Werner Willhaus (September 2008). Kittel-Dampftriebwagen: Innovation des Nahverkehrs vor über 100 Jahren. EK-Verlag. ISBN 978-3-88255-106-8.
- Rainer Zschech (1993). Dampf- und Verbrennungstriebwagen: Deutsche Reichsbahn-Gesellschaft, Deutsche Reichsbahn, Deutsche Bundesbahn. Transpress. ISBN 978-3-344-70766-8.
- Erich Preuß; Reiner Preuß (1991). Sächsische Staatseisenbahnen. Transpress. ISBN 978-3-344-70700-2.
- Fritz Näbrich, Günter Meyer, Reiner Preuß: Lokomotivarchiv Sachsen 2, Transpress VEB Verlag für Verkehrswesen, Berlin, 1983
- Krauss-Maffei, Deutsches Museum Munich (ca. 1977): Lokomotiven im Deutschen Museum

Other countries

These sources are in German

- Ostendorf, Rolf (1977). Dampftriebwagen, Bauarten, Typen und Systeme. Motorbuchverlag, Stuttgart. ISBN 3-87943-517-0.
