= Kerr Stuart steam railmotor =

Steam railcar

Kerr Stuart steam motor car
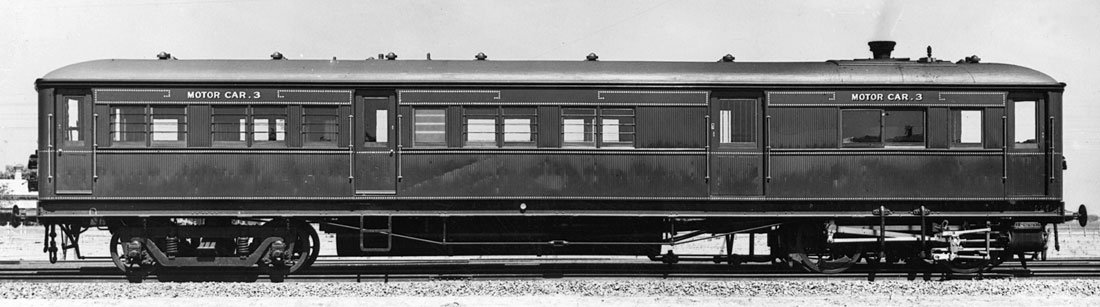
- Kerr Stuart steam railmotor in 1913
Type and origin
- Power type: Steam, vertical boiler
- Builder: Kerr, Stuart and Company - power unit Victorian Railways - body
- Build date: 1912
- Total produced: 1
Specifications
- Configuration
  - Whyte: 0-4-0+4
- Gauge: 5 ft 3 in (1,600 mm)
- Driver dia.: 48 in (1,200 mm)
- Length: 60 ft (18 m)
- Loco weight: 41.52 long tons (42.19 t; 46.50 short tons)
- Fuel type: Coal
- Fuel capacity: 1,680 lb (760 kg)
- Water cap.: 430 imp gal (2,000 L)
- Firebox
  - Grate area: 14.18 sq ft (1.317 m^{2})
- Boiler pressure: 160 psi (1,100 kPa)
- Heating surface: 663.64 sq ft (61.654 m^{2})
- Cylinders: 2
- Cylinder size: 16 in × 12 in (406 mm × 305 mm)
- Valve gear: Walschaerts
Performance figures
- Tractive effort: 6,144 lbf (27.33 kN)
Career
- Operators: Victorian Railways
- Number in class: 1
- Numbers: Motor Car 3
- First run: 25 January 1913
- Last run: 1924
- Disposition: Scrapped

The Kerr Stuart steam railmotor, also known as Motor Car 3, was a steam railcar operated by the Victorian Railways from 1913 to 1924.

== Construction ==
The engine unit was ordered in April 1912 from Kerr, Stuart and Company It was of the same type used on steam railcars of the Great Western Railway. The engine unit was delivered to Melbourne on 24 November 1912.

The body was constructed by the Victorian Railways at Newport Workshops. The body was supported on the power bogie by four vertical links in the same style as the Great Western Railway steam railcars. It was designated Motor Car 3 (following on from the Rowan steam railmotors which were Motors No. 1 and No. 2) and entered service in June 1913. It could carry 27 first class and 27 second class passengers, using seats from the contemporary Tait trains.

== Service ==
Motor Car 3 made its first run on 25 January 1913 and commenced regular testing the following month. It entered service on 5 March 1913 between Warrnambool and Hamilton. It was unable to accommodate the number of passengers and a trailer car for 30 passengers was attached. The additional weight of the trailer car resulted in it running late on every trip and requiring water every 18 miles. By late April 1913 the new steam car had failed and had to be returned to Newport for repairs.

From May 1913, it operated between Maryborough and St Arnaud, initially as a temporary measure to replace a McKeen railmotor and permanently from April 1914.

From January 1915, it operated local services between Ballan and Ballarat. However it suffered frequent breakdowns and accommodation for passengers and luggage was often inadequate.

== Withdrawal ==
By 1922, the cost of operating the one-carriage steam car proved to be more expensive than the new petrol cars. Motor Car 3 was withdrawn in 1924 after travelling 50,000 miles (80,000 km) in service and was scrapped in 1927.

== See also ==
- Rowan steam railmotor
- GWR steam rail motors
- L&YR Kerr Stuart railmotors
