= Class 387 =

Class 387 may refer to:

- British Rail Class 387
- ČSD Class 387.0
