= České dráhy Museum =

- Muzeum Českých drah

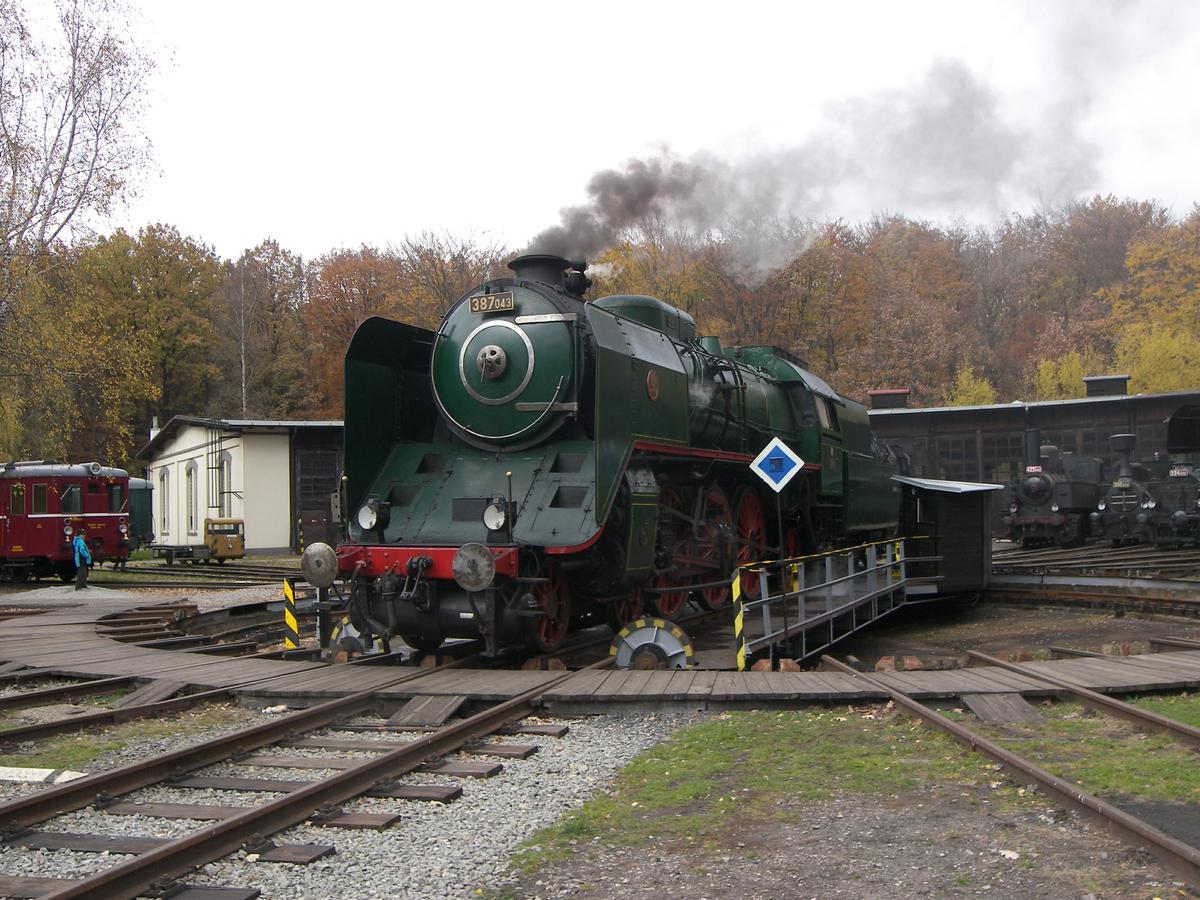

- Location within Czech Republic
- Established: 1999
- Location: 9. května 255, Lužná, Czech Republic, 270 51
- Coordinates: 50°8′44″N 13°46′32″E
- Type: Railway museum
- Owner: České dráhy
- Website: www.cdnostalgie.cz

The České dráhy Museum (Czech: Muzeum Českých drah) is a railway museum in Lužná in the Central Bohemian Region of the Czech Republic. it is operated by the České dráhy company. It is located close to the local railway station.

== History ==
The premises of the museum are a historic heating plant. They were the last in Czechoslovakia with steam traffic, which ended here in the 1970s. The place began to be used for exhibitions. The operation of the depot ended in 1996 and the railway museum was established in 1999. It is the largest railway museum in the Czech Republic with the largest collection of steam locomotives.

== Exhibits ==
=== Steam locomotives ===
Identity	Other number(s)	Railway	Builder	Works number	Built	Wheel arrangement	Gauge	Notes	Image
KND Nr.6								Oldest locomotive on site	
310.076	97.167	KkStB	Wiener Lokomotivfabrik, Floridsdorf		1899	0-6-0T	1,435 mm (4 ft 8 1/2 in)		
313.432			První Českomoravská továrna na stroje v Praze, Prague		1904	0-6-0T	1,435 mm (4 ft 8 1/2 in)		
324.391									
354.195			Českomoravská – Kolben, Prague		1925	4-6-2	1,435 mm (4 ft 8 1/2 in)	Operational	
354.7152		KkStB				2-6-2	1,435 mm (4 ft 8 1/2 in)	Servicable	
387.043 Mikádo							1,435 mm (4 ft 8 1/2 in)		
414.096	73.368		St.E.G.	3282	1906	0-8-0	1,435 mm (4 ft 8 1/2 in)		
422.062			Krauss, Linz	6619	1907	0-8-0	1,435 mm (4 ft 8 1/2 in)	Static exhibit	
422.098									
423.009									
423.094									
434.1100		KkStB							
477.043 Papoušek			ČKD Praha		1954	4-8-4	1,435 mm (4 ft 8 1/2 in)	Operable	
498.022			Škoda Plzeň		1947	4-8-2	1,435 mm (4 ft 8 1/2 in)		
498.112			Zavody V. I. Lenina v Plzni		1955	4-8-2	1,435 mm (4 ft 8 1/2 in)		
524.1110			ČKD Praha		1931	2-10-2	1,435 mm (4 ft 8 1/2 in)		
534.0323 Kremák			Škoda Plzeň		1946	2-10-0	1,435 mm (4 ft 8 1/2 in)	Operates with tender 935.117	
556.0254									
556.0271 Štokr			Závody V. I. Lenina Plzeň		1955	2-10-0	1,435 mm (4 ft 8 1/2 in)	Last steam locomotive built in Czechoslovakia	
556.0298

=== Diesel locomotives ===
Identity	Other number(s)	Railway	Builder	Works number	Built	Wheel arrangement	Gauge	Notes	Image
705 916-5	TU47.016		ČKD Prague		1958	Bo-Bo-de	760 mm (2 ft 5 15/16 in)		
T211.0101	700 101-9		ČKD Prague		1960	B-dm	1,435 mm (4 ft 8 1/2 in)		
T 212.0001									
T 212.0069	702 069								
T 334.085	710 085-2		ČKD Prague		1966	C-dh	1,435 mm (4 ft 8 1/2 in)		
720 058-7	T 435.0058		ČKD Prague		1960	Bo-Bo-de	1,435 mm (4 ft 8 1/2 in)		
T 435.0139						Bo-Bo-de	1,435 mm (4 ft 8 1/2 in)		
T 444.0030			Turčianske strojárne Martin		1963	B-B-dh	1,435 mm (4 ft 8 1/2 in)		
T 458.1190	721 190–7					Bo-Bo-de	1,435 mm (4 ft 8 1/2 in)		
T 466.0286	735 286–7		ZTS Martin		1979	Bo-Bo-de	1,435 mm (4 ft 8 1/2 in)		
T 478.3101	753.101-5		ČKD, Prague		1973	Bo-Bo-de	1,435 mm (4 ft 8 1/2 in)		
T 669.0001	770.001-6		ČKD, Praha	6067	1963	Co-Co-de	1,435 mm (4 ft 8 1/2 in)		
T 679.1600	781.600-2		VTZ Lokomotivka, Voroshilovgrad		1979	Co-Co-de	1,435 mm (4 ft 8 1/2 in)		

=== Electric locomotives ===
Identity	Other number(s)	Railway	Builder	Works number	Built	Wheel arrangement	Gauge	Notes	Image
E212.001	130 001	Technolen Svitavy	Škoda, Plzeň	3713	1958; Rebuilt 1998	Bo	1,435 mm (4 ft 8 1/2 in)	Battery powered	
S 489.0044	230 044-0		Škoda, Plzeň	5386	1966	Bo-Bo	1,435 mm (4 ft 8 1/2 in)	25kV 50 Hz AC	
180 001	E 669.001		Škoda, Plzeň	3711	1959	Co-Co	1,435 mm (4 ft 8 1/2 in)	3000 V DC	
181 001	E 669.101		Škoda, Plzeň	4235	1961	Co-Co	1,435 mm (4 ft 8 1/2 in)	3000 V DC	
141 001	E 499.101		Škoda, Plzeň	3393	1957	Bo-Bo	1,435 mm (4 ft 8 1/2 in)	3000 V DC	

=== Railcars ===
Identity	Other number(s)	Railway	Builder	Works number	Built	Wheel arrangement	Gauge	Notes	Image
M 124.01 Komarek	kkStB 1.0	kkStB						Steam	
M 131.105			Tatra, Kopřivnice	66313	1948	A1-dm	1,435 mm (4 ft 8 1/2 in)		
M 131.1463						A1-dm	1,435 mm (4 ft 8 1/2 in)		
M 131.1487						A1-dm	1,435 mm (4 ft 8 1/2 in)		
M 152.0002			Vagónka Studénka	74889	1974	A-1-dh	1,435 mm (4 ft 8 1/2 in)		
M 240.0100			Vagónka Tatra Studénka	65833	1964	2-B-dh	1,435 mm (4 ft 8 1/2 in)		
M 260.001									
M 262.0076			Tatra Studénka	52545	1953	2'-Bo-de	1,435 mm (4 ft 8 1/2 in)		
