= KkStB 97 =

kkStB 97 SB 100 BBÖ 97 ČSD 310.0 ČSD 310.9 PKP TKh12 JDŽ 150 FS 822 DR-Class 98^{70 II} ÖBB 89
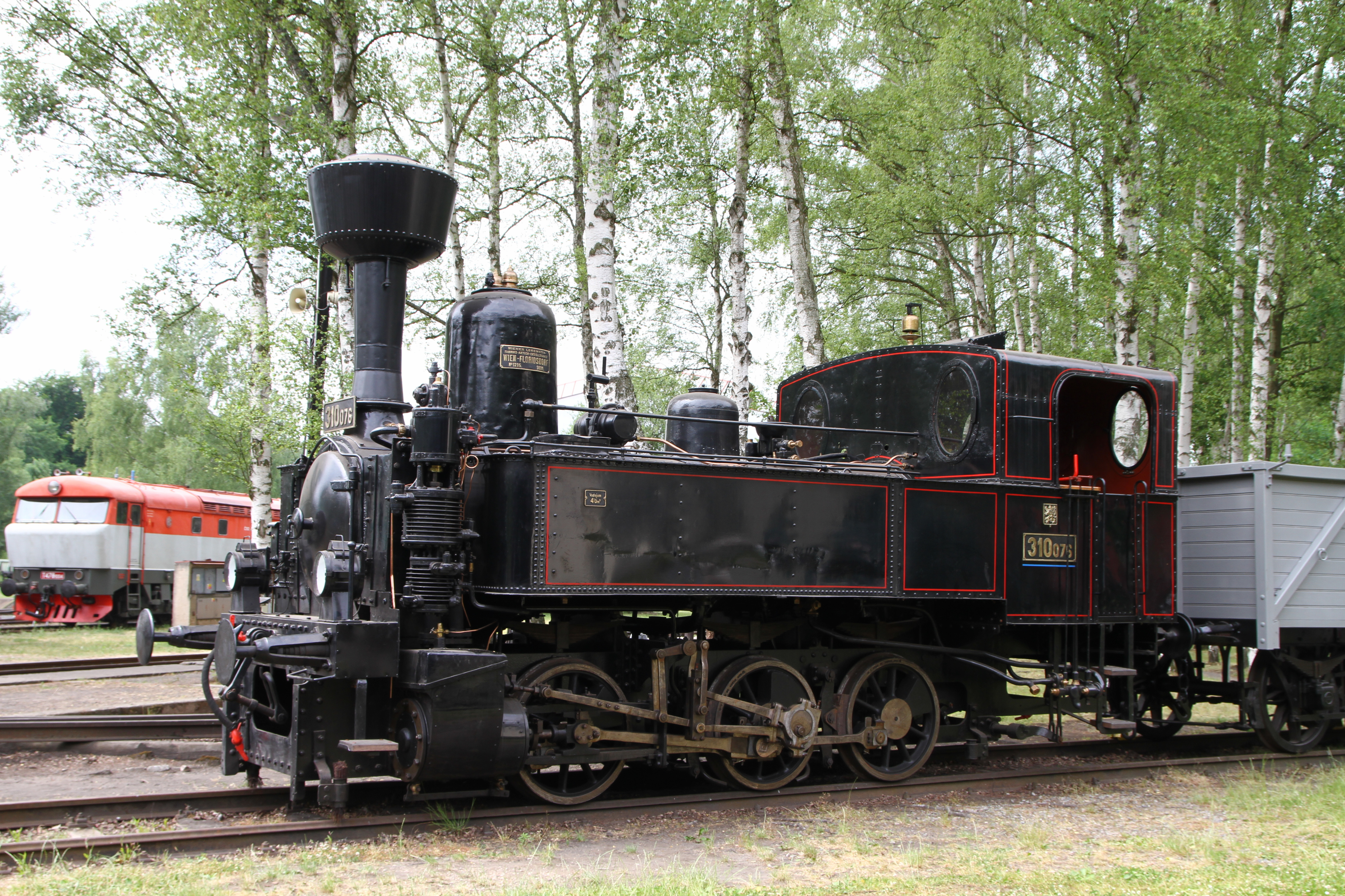
- ČSD 310.076 (ex kkStB 97.167) in the Lužná railway museum
Type and origin
- Builder: Wiener Neustädter Lokomotivfabrik (66); Lokomotivfabrik der StEG (38); Lokomotivfabrik Floridsdorf (22); Krauss (Linz) (65); Böhmisch-Mährische Maschinenfabrik (37)
- Build date: 1878–1911
- Total produced: 228
Specifications
- Configuration
  - Whyte: 0-6-0T
- Gauge: 1,435 mm (4 ft 8 1/2 in) standard gauge
- Driver dia.: 950 mm (3 ft 1 3/8 in)
- Minimum curve: 90 m (295 ft 3 1/4 in)
- Wheelbase
  - Overall: 2,700 mm (8 ft 10 1/4 in)
- Length: 7,927 mm (26 ft 0 in)
- Height: 4,034 mm (13 ft 2 7/8 in)
- Adhesive weight: 27.0 or 27.2 t (26.6 or 26.8 long tons; 29.8 or 30.0 short tons) (half supplies)
- Empty weight: 22.1 or 22.6 t (21.8 or 22.2 long tons; 24.4 or 24.9 short tons)
- Service weight: 29.0 or 30.6 t (28.5 or 30.1 long tons; 32.0 or 33.7 short tons)
- Fuel capacity: 1.0–1.5 t (2,200–3,310 lb) of coal
- Water cap.: 3.0–4.1 m^{3} (660–900 imp gal; 790–1,080 US gal)
- Boiler
- No. of heating tubes: 99
- Boiler pressure: 10 or 11 kgf/cm^{2} (981 or 1,080 kPa; 142 or 156 lbf/in^{2})
- Heating surface
  - Firebox: 1.04 m^{2} (11.2 sq ft)
  - Radiative: 4.35 m^{2} (46.8 sq ft)
  - Tubes: 54.72 m^{2} (589.0 sq ft)
  - Evaporative: 59.07 m^{2} (635.8 sq ft)
- Cylinders: 2
- Cylinder size: 345 or 325 mm (13 9/16 or 12 13/16 in)
- Piston stroke: 480 mm (18 7/8 in)
Performance figures
- Maximum speed: 40 km/h (25 mph)
- Indicated power: 310 PS (228 kW; 306 hp)
Career
- Numbers: kkStB: 97.01 … 97.255; DRB: 98 7011 – 98 7033; ÖBB: 89.01 … 89.240; ČSD: 310.001 – 310.099, 310.0100 – 310.0133
- Retired: ÖBB: by 1958; ČSD: by 1968

The kkStB 97 were a class of 228 0-6-0T locomotive operated by the Imperial Royal Austrian State Railways (kaiserlich-königliche österreichische Staatsbahnen), or k.k.StB, for duties on secondary routes (Nebenbahnen) and branch lines (Lokalbahnen).

== History ==
The small locomotives were built by all five Austrian locomotive factories between 1878 and 1911 for a total of 228 examples.

In detail, the 97.01–03 belonged to the Dalmatian State Railway, the 97.04–06 to the Arlbergbahn (Arlberg Railway), the 97.07–08 to the Galizischen Transversalbahn (Galician Transversal Railway), the 97.16–19 to the Mährisch-Schlesischen Centralbahn (Moravian-Silesian Central Railway), the 97.20–23 to the Staatsbahn Unter Drauburg–Wolfsberg (Unter Drauburg – Wolfsberg State Railway), the 97.24–25 to the Staatsbahn Mürzzuschlag–Neuberg (Mürzzuschlag-Neuberg State Railway); the 97.09–97.15, 97.51–97.255 were ordered directly by the kkStB while the numbers 97.26–97.50, 97.100 and 97.200 were never used.

The Neutitscheiner Lokalbahn (Neutitscheiner Local Railway) acquired three more locomotives with the names ZAUCHTEL, NEUTITSCHEIN and KUNEWALD. The Lokalbahn Littau–Groß Senitz also procured two corresponding locomotives. They were numbered as No. 1 LITOVEL and No. 2 CHOLINA.

The Austrian Southern Railway Company (Südbahngesellschaft, SB), which operated on the Unter Drauburg – Wolfsberg State Railway, classified the 97.20–23 used there as series 100 with the operating numbers 11–14. The locomotives of the Mürzzuschlag – Neuberg State Railway, on which the SB also ran, were also classified in the 100 series and given the operating numbers 20–21.

As a result of the long delivery times, there were also design differences between the individual delivery series. This applies in particular to the driver's cab, the valve types and the shape of the sandbox. What they all had in common, however, was the low boiler position and the side tanks that extended to the front of the boiler, which gave the machines their angular appearance and thus their nickname "coffee grinder".

After the First World War, a large part of the class remained in Czechoslovakia, Yugoslavia, Italy, Poland and Romania. 133 locomotives came to the Czechoslovak State Railways (ČSD), which they classified as 310.0. The Polish State Railways (PKP) classified them as series TKh12, the Yugoslav Railways JDŽ as series 150 and the Italian Ferrovie dello Stato (FS) as series 822. The Romanian State Railways (CFR) also received locomotives of this class, but did not give them their own series designation. The three locomotives of the Neutitscheiner local railway were used by ČSD as 310.908–910. Only 31 locomotives passed to the BBÖ. The Deutsche Reichsbahn took over 19 of them as 98 7011 – 98 7028 after the annexation of Austria in 1938.

In the course of the Second World War, other locomotives of this series came to the Reichsbahn, which they designated 98 7029 – 98 7033. After 1945 three machines were handed over to the Hungarian State Railways (MÁV) and the JDŽ, so only 16 came to the ÖBB as the 89 series. The 89.240 was even equipped with a Giesl ejector in order to test the effects of this system on locomotives with lower power. The last 89 class locomotive was retired in 1958. On the ČSD, the locomotives remained in operation until the end of the 1960s. The last coffee grinder ("Kafemlejnek"), 310.097, was retired in 1968 from the Bratislava locomotive depot.

== Preserved locomotives ==
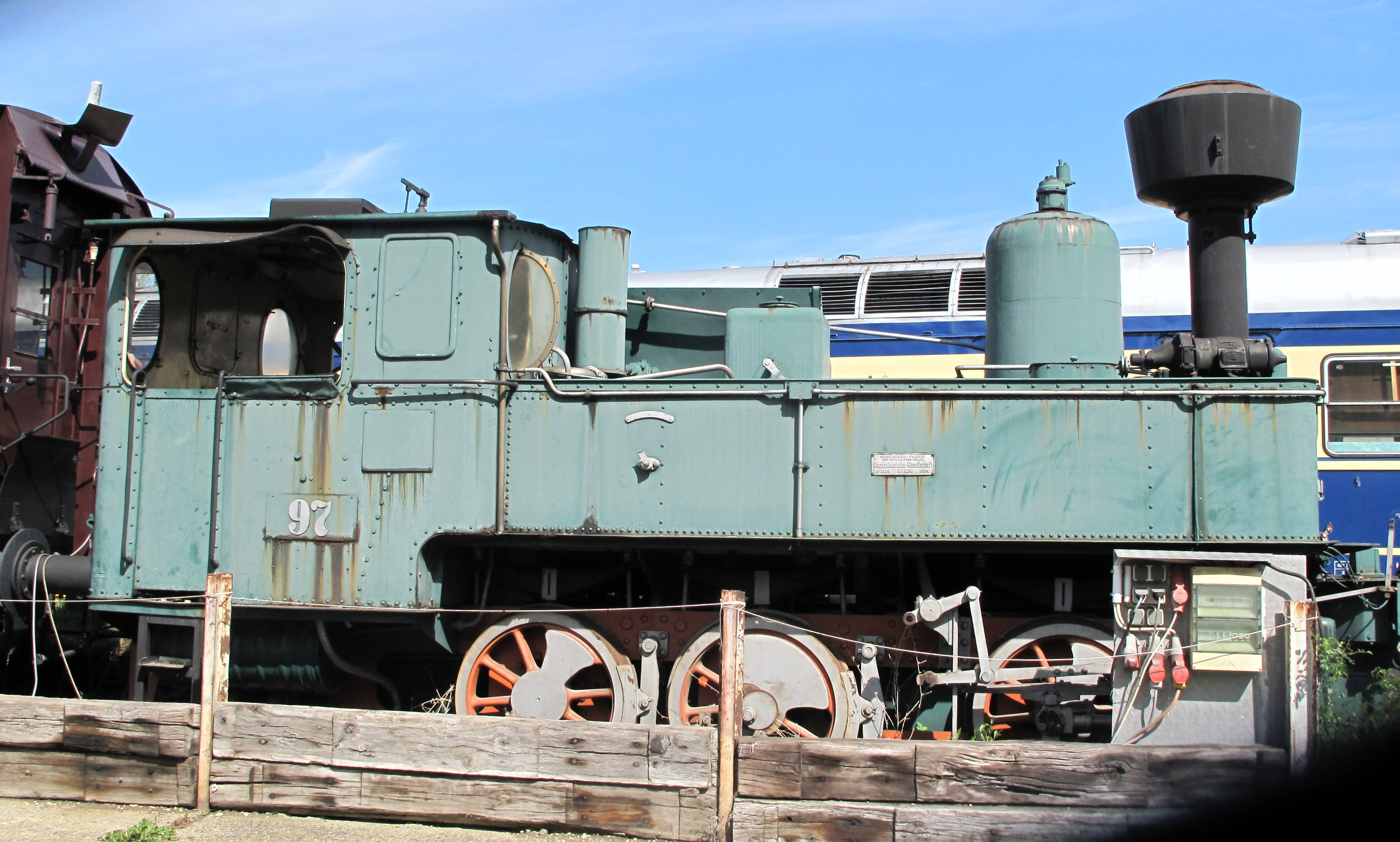
ÖBB 0-6-0T 97.273 at the Vienna Railway Museum Heizhaus

Fifteen locomotives have been preserved - the vast majority being ex ČSD, with one each from the JŽ, PKP and ÖBB.
