= GWR steam rail motors =

Self-propelled steam carriages operated by the Great Western Railway

GWR steam railmotor (dimensions from No. 2)
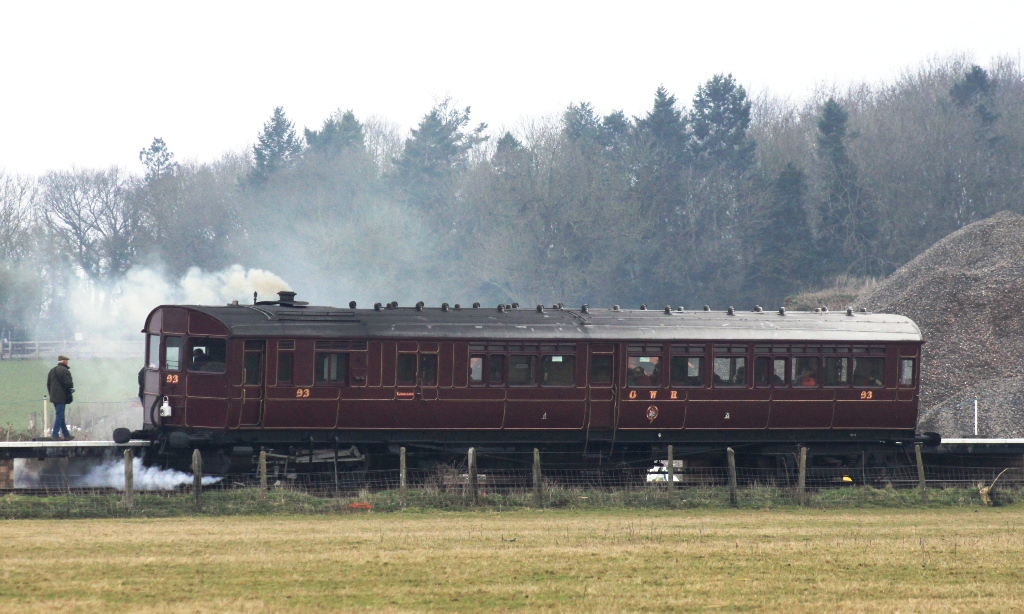
- No. 93 after restoration in 2013
Type and origin
- Power type: Steam
- Designer: George Jackson Churchward
- Builder: GWR Swindon Works; Kerr, Stuart and Company; Gloucester Railway Carriage and Wagon Company
- Build date: 1903–1908
- Total produced: 99
Specifications
- Configuration
  - Whyte: 0-4-0+4TR (power bogie)
- Gauge: standard gauge
- Coupled dia.: 4 ft 0 in (1.219 m)
- Wheelbase: 8 ft 0 in (2.438 m)
  - Coupled: 3 ft 8 in (1.118 m)
  - Trailing: 3 ft 7 in (1.092 m) (unpowered bogie)
- Length
  - Over headstocks: 57 ft 0 3/4 in (17.393 m)
- Width: 8 ft 6 3/4 in (2.610 m)
- Height: 13 ft 4 1/2 in (4.077 m)
- Fuel capacity: 0.5 t; 0.6 short tons
- Water cap.: 450 imp gal (2,000 L; 540 US gal)
- Firebox
  - Grate area: 11.46 sq ft (1.065 m^{2})
- Boiler
  - Model: Fire tube
  - Type: Vertical
  - Diameter: 4 ft 6 in (1.372 m)–6 ft 0 in (1.829 m)
  - Tube plates: 4 ft 4 3/4 in (1.340 m)
  - Small tubes: 477 x 1 1/8 in (0.029 m)
- Boiler pressure: 140 psi (0.97 MPa)
- Heating surface
  - Firebox: 44.34 sq ft (4.119 m^{2})
  - Tubes: 625.58 sq ft (58.118 m^{2})
  - Total surface: 669.92 sq ft (62.238 m^{2})
- Cylinders: 2
- Cylinder size: 12 in × 16 in (305 mm × 406 mm)
Performance figures
- Tractive effort: 6,398 lbf (28.46 kN)
Career
- Withdrawn: 1914 (1), 1922-1935 (The Rest)
- Preserved: 1
- Disposition: 98 scrapped

The steam rail motors (SRM) were self-propelled carriages operated by the Great Western Railway in England and Wales from 1903 to 1935. They incorporated a steam locomotive within the body of the carriage.

== History ==
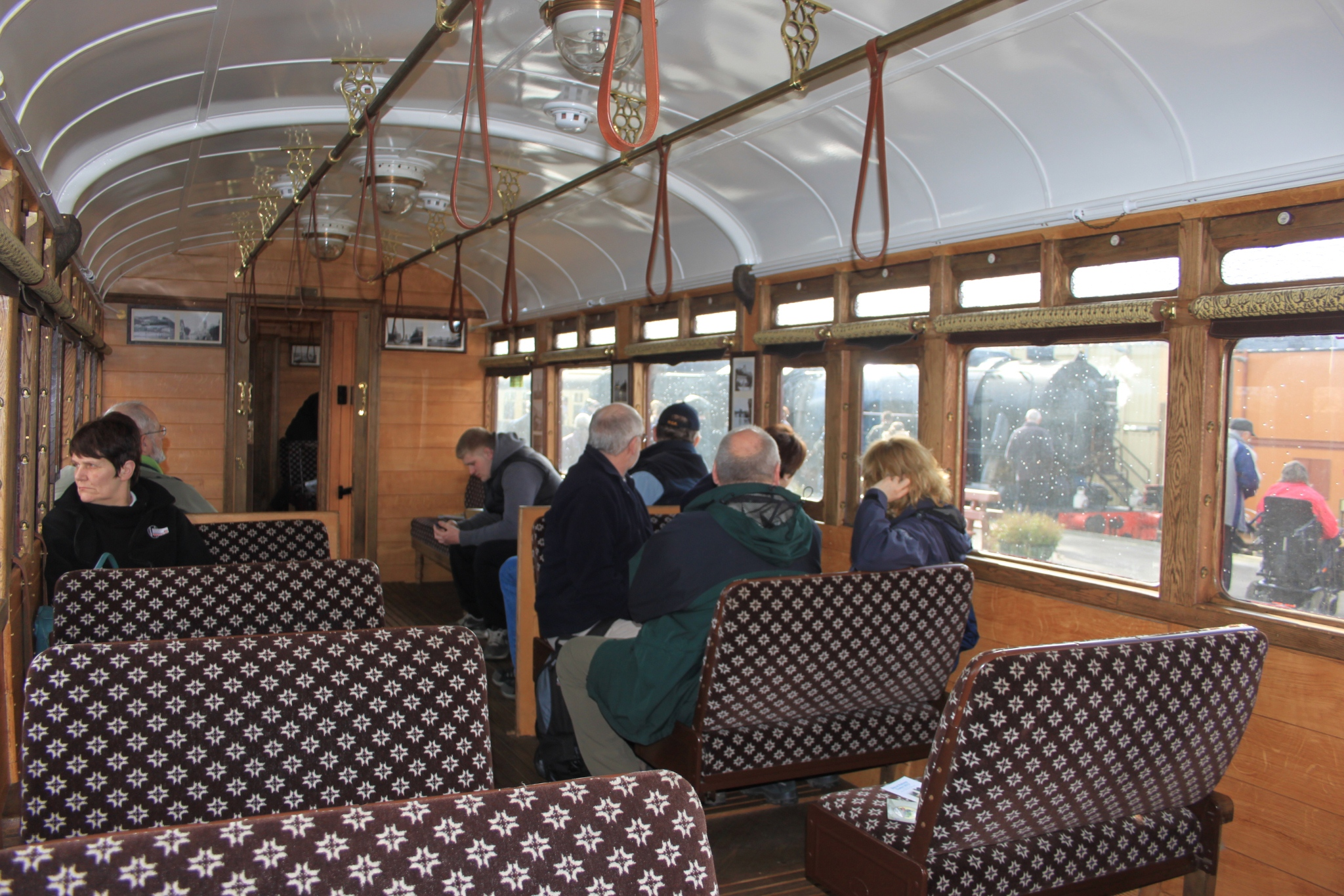
Steam Railmotors featured large saloons and tram-style turn-over seats so they appeared much more spacious and modern than the compartment trains that were the norm in the United Kingdom at the time

In the first years of the twentieth century, railway managements turned their attention to the need to provide better local passenger services and to reduce costs, in the face of increasing demand for convenient travel and the competitive threat posed by urban tramways.

The original strengths of railways—a fixed track, multiple vehicle passenger trains, highly structured and staffed stations—had limitations in responding to changing needs. The London and South Western Railway had successfully operated a railmotor, consisting of a self-contained passenger vehicle with its own steam power unit, on its Southsea Railway, and the Great Western Railway arranged to borrow one unit for trials on its Golden Valley Line in Gloucestershire. On this rural route with a scattered population along the rail corridor, the new vehicles enabled a more frequent service to be operated at lower cost. Stops were made at new locations, and passengers joined and left the train at cheap and simple ground-level platforms using power operated steps on the vehicles. Six new stopping places were provided between Chalford and Gloucester for this service. The guard issued tickets on the train, avoiding the need for staffing at the halts. The vehicles could be driven from either end, so time was not lost in running round at terminals, as would be the case in locomotive hauled trains.

The trial proved successful and a steam rail motor was designed by the Chief Mechanical Engineer George Jackson Churchward. Two units were manufactured, and they entered service on the same route on 12 October 1903. A further 44 were built during 1904 and 1905, and by the time production finished in 1908 the fleet numbered 99 carriage units. There were 112 power units which could be changed between carriages to suit maintenance needs.

The rail motors were also deployed in cities such as Plymouth, where they operated frequent services calling at new stopping places, competing with the new electric tramways.

The relatively limited accommodation led to problems at busy periods, and driving trailers were constructed with a mechanical facility to control the main unit, so that the train could be driven from the driving trailer, maintaining the avoidance of running round at terminals. However, the available power in the small steam engine was a limitation, especially on routes with steep gradients. Maggs records that on the Wrington Vale Light Railway it was frequently necessary for the rail motor to stop on the 1 in 50 gradient to raise enough steam to continue.

Steam engines need frequent servicing, and while this was being undertaken the coach unit was not available for use; steam engine maintenance is also exceptionally dirty, and keeping the passenger sections in an acceptable state of cleanliness was an issue.

Most rail motors were converted into driving trailers for push-and-pull trains (sometimes referred to as autocoaches) serving a separate steam locomotive, and the original power units were scrapped. Autotrains offered many of the benefits of rail motors but, because they were operated by separate locomotives, were much more flexible in operation and easier to maintain. The first of the original rail motors was withdrawn in 1914, but sixty-five survived until 1922. Three of the units were then sold to the London and Blackwall Railway and the last was withdrawn in 1935.

Rail motors Nos. 42 and 49, along with ex-Port Talbot Railway No. 1 (which had been acquired by the GWR in 1908) were sold to the Port of London Authority.

== Fleet ==
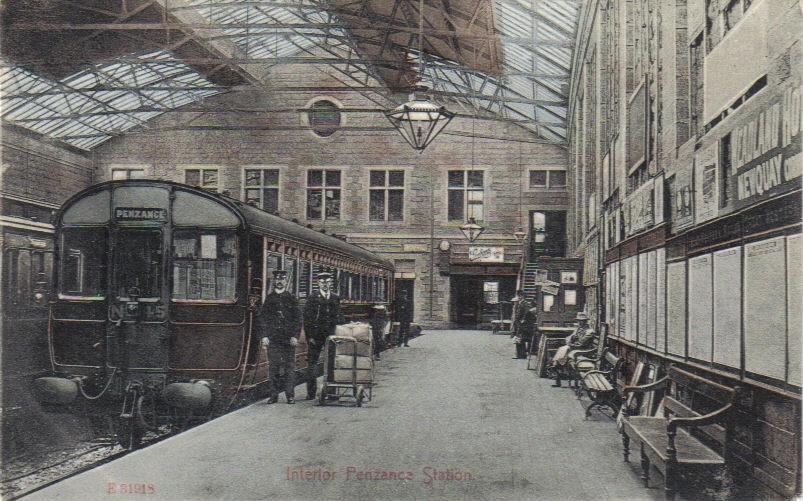
Diagram M number 45 at Penzance c.1915

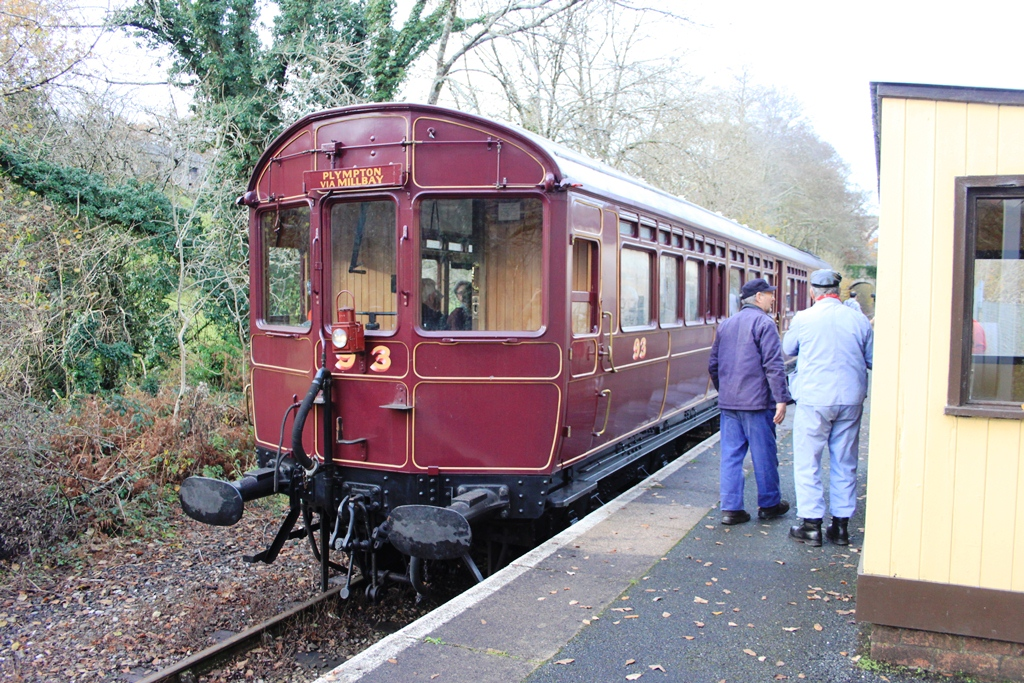
Diagram R number 93 at Coombe Junction Halt, Looe Valley Line, in 2012

All of the fleet were built with four-wheel vertical-boiler power units and a four-wheel trailing bogie under the carriage. Driving wheels were from 3 ft 5 in (1,041 mm) to 4 ft 0 in (1,219 mm); cylinders were from 9 in × 15 in (229 mm × 381 mm) to 12 in × 16 in (305 mm × 406 mm).

Some dimensions were 3/4 inch (19 mm) larger than shown in this table where figures have been rounded down to nearest one inch (25 mm).

Diagram(s)	Quantity	Numbers	Completed	Length	Width
A, A1	2	1-2	1903	57 feet (17.4 m)	8.5 feet (2.59 m)
B, C, D	12	3-14	1904	59.5 feet (18.1 m)	8.5 feet (2.59 m)
E	2	15-16	1905	56 feet (17.1 m)	9 feet (2.74 m)
F, G, G1	12	17-28	1904	59.5 feet (18.1 m)	8.5 feet (2.59 m)
H, J, J1	8	29-36	1905	59.5 feet (18.1 m)	9 feet (2.74 m)
K, K1	4	37-40	1905	70 feet (21.3 m)	9 feet (2.74 m)
L	2	41-42	1905	59.5 feet (18.1 m)	9 feet (2.74 m)
M, M1, N	10	43-52	1905	70 feet (21.3 m)	9 feet (2.74 m)
O	18	53-58, 61-72	1906	70 feet (21.3 m)	9 feet (2.74 m)
P	2	59-60	1905	70 feet (21.3 m)	9 feet (2.74 m)
Q	8	73-80	1906	70 feet (21.3 m)	9 feet (2.74 m)
Q1	3	81-83	1907	59.5 feet (18.1 m)	9 feet (2.74 m)
R	16	84-99	1908	70 feet (21.3 m)	9 feet (2.74 m)

The first sixteen rail motors did not provide luggage space and were designated "suburban", but from No. 17 on, a small luggage compartment was added. The later rail motors were designated "branch".

Most of the rail motors were built at Swindon Works, but 14 (GWR Nos. 15, 16, and 61–72) were built by Kerr, Stuart and Company, and 8 (GWR Nos. 73–80) were built by the Gloucester Railway Carriage and Wagon Company (GRC&W). The GRC&W were primarily carriage builders and seem to have contracted out the construction of the engine to another Gloucester firm, Summers and Scott. Kerr Stuart later sold an engine for a similar rail motor to Victorian Railways in Australia.

== Number 93 ==
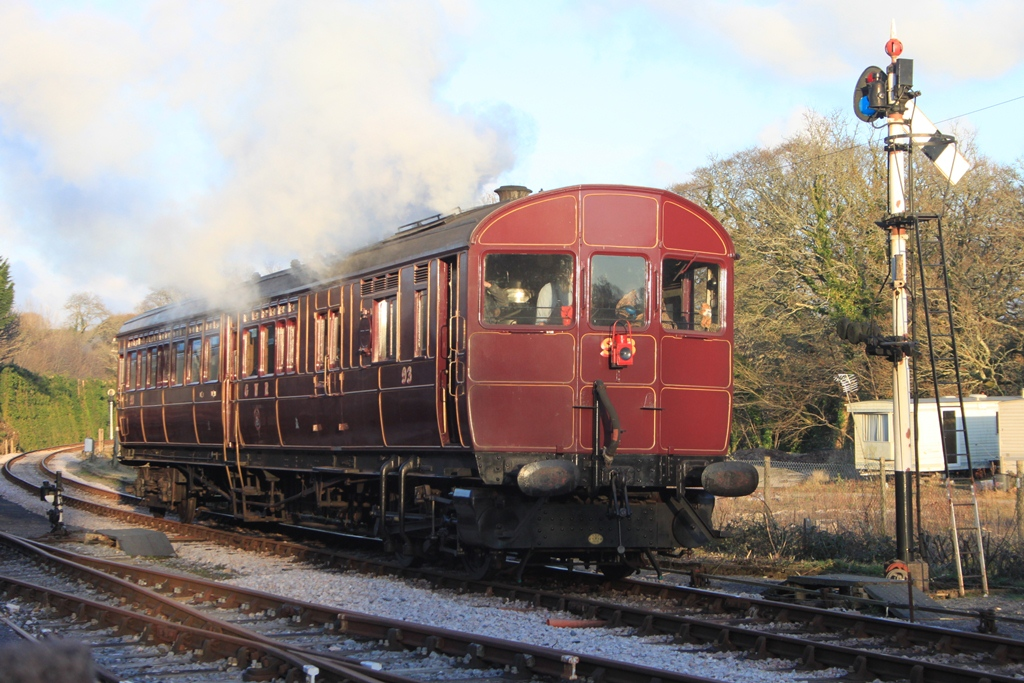
Number 93 at Staverton on the South Devon Railway

In February 1908, a steam rail motor was turned out from Swindon railway works and given the number 93. It was one of sixteen built to Diagram R, the last batch of steam rail motors. These were 70 feet (21 m) long and 9 feet (2.7 m) wide. After running 479,006 miles (770,885 km) it was withdrawn in November 1934, the power unit was removed and the carriage portion converted into an auto trailer. Now renumbered 212, it operated in this form until May 1956. It was then put into use as a "Work Study Coach" and later as a static office in Birmingham.

In 1970, it was sold to the Great Western Society and moved to their base at Didcot Railway Centre but it was not until 1998 that they were able to make a start on returning it to original condition as a steam rail motor. The frame of the new power bogie was erected in November 2000 at the Tyseley Locomotive Works and was then mounted on wheels and fitted with a boiler. In March 2008 the power bogie was put on display at Didcot. In January 2009 it was moved to the Llangollen Railway where the carriage portion was restored and the two portions brought together. Work was completed in March 2011 and No. 93 returned to public service at Didcot in May later that year.

In June 2012, No. 93 was approved for main line operation, even though the re-introduction of wooden bodied vehicles had not been allowed for many years, and was subject to restrictions to reduce the possibility of collisions and any subsequent damage. Since then No. 93 has run on various railways including the Bodmin and Wenford, the South Devon, and the Looe branch (Network Rail).

In 2013, the restoration of auto trailer No. 92 was completed at Llangollen (as part of the same project). The railmotor and trailer ran together for the first time in preservation later in the year.

== See also ==
- Bristol and Exeter Railway Fairfield steam carriage
- British steam railcars
- GWR Autocoach
- Steam railcars
