= Rowan steam railmotor =

Self-propelled rail passenger carriage

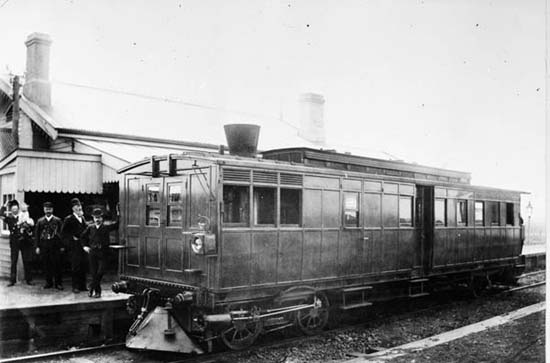
- Rowan Car No.1 in the 1880s
Type and origin
- Power type: Steam, vertical boiler
- Designer: William Robert Rowan
- Builder: Kitson and Company, Victorian Railways
- Build date: 1883 - 1888
- Total produced: 1 + spare power unit
Specifications
- Gauge: 5 ft 3 in (1,600 mm)
- Driver dia.: 36 in (910 mm)
- Length: Original No.1: 42 ft 6 in (13 m)
- Loco weight: Original No.1: 14.25 long tons (14 t)
- Fuel type: Coal
- Fuel capacity: 660 lb (300 kg)
- Water cap.: 230 imp gal (1,000 L)
- Boiler pressure: 140 psi (970 kPa)
- Cylinders: 2
- Cylinder size: 9 in × 3.5 in (229 mm × 89 mm)
Performance figures
- Maximum speed: 30 mph (48 km/h)
- Power output: 40 hp (30 kW)
- Tractive effort: 3,500 lbf (16 kN)
Career
- Operators: Victorian Railways
- Number in class: 2
- Numbers: Rowan Car No.1 (Motor No.1) - Rowan Car No.2 (Motor No.2)
- First run: 1 June 1883
- Disposition: Sold

The Rowan steam railmotor was a steam railcar operated by the Victorian Railways.

== Design ==
The type was designed by William Robert Rowan, Managing Director of the Scandia Company of Copenhagen, Denmark. The design was brought to the attention of the Victorian Railways by Captain Frederick Charles Rowan, brother of the patentee and author of a book on railways for sparsely populated country districts.

A feature of the design was provision for the easy removal of the power unit for repair, allowing a substitute unit to be fitted.

== Details ==
=== Rowan Car No. 1 / Motor No. 1 ===
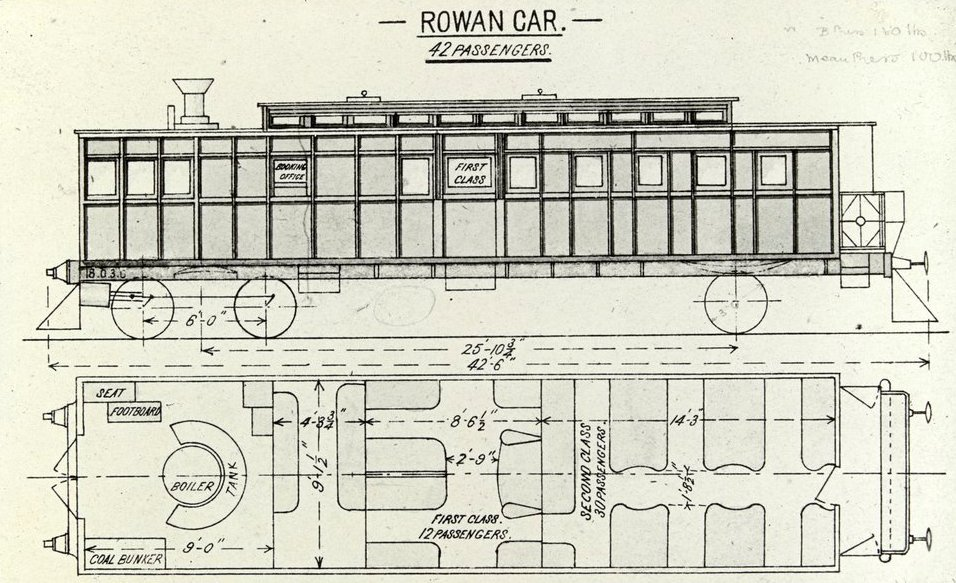
Rowan Car No. 1 diagram

Rowan Car No. 1 was delivered complete from the manufacturer. The power unit was built by Kitson and Company (b/n T69 of 1883) of Leeds, England, who were also sole agent for the type in the Australasian Colonies.

As built it was double deck with a capacity of 60 passengers and 490 cu ft (14 m^{3}) of goods. Before entering service. Victorian Railways modified it to carry 42 passengers, 12 in first class and 30 in second class, on a single deck. The overall length was 42 ft 6 in (12.95 m) and the tare weight was 14.25 long tons (14.48 t).

It was test run on the Williamstown line on 1 June 1883. On 1 July 1883 it was test run between Lancefield Road and Sunbury where it was able to haul up to 30 tons in addition to its own weight and reach up to 30 mph (48 km/h) on level track.

It ran in regular local service between Camberwell and Box Hill for one month and was also test run to Lilydale. In 1884, it was running between Maryborough and Avoca.

For most of the 1880s, it ran local trains between Essendon and Broadmeadows where it was known unofficially as the "Broady Car".

In September 1892, the railcar was converted to a separate engine unit and trailer. The boiler pressure was reduced to 130 psi (900 kPa) and the power unit was thereafter known as Motor No. 1.

=== Rowan Car No. 2 / Motor No. 2 ===
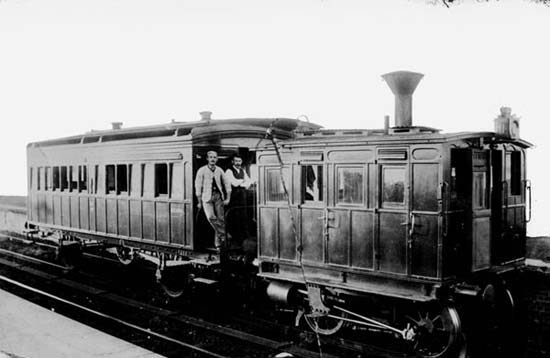
Motor No. 2.

A spare power unit (Kitson b/n T70 of 1883) was delivered with Car No. 1 so they could be swapped when one needed repairs. In 1888, the Victorian Railways turned it into a second steam motor called Rowan Car No. 2. It could haul a conventional passenger car or up to 35 tons of goods vehicles. It operated mainly on the Outer Circle line. With the conversion of Rowan Car No. 1 into Motor No. 1, from 1892 it became known as Motor No. 2.

=== Withdrawal by VR ===
Motor No. 1 is believed to have been little used after conversion and was sold to the Melbourne and Altona Colliery Company. Motor No. 2 was withdrawn in 1904.

The trailer from Rowan Car No. 1 was converted to a conventional passenger car which remained in service until 1926.

=== Purchase by Sanderson and Grant ===
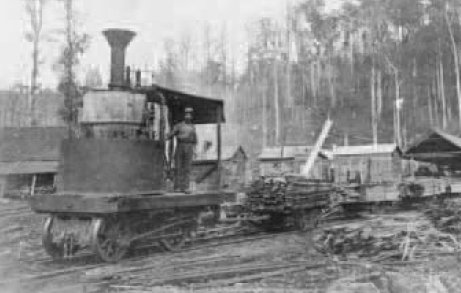
One of the Kitson power units regauged to 3 ft 6 in (1,067 mm) gauge c. 1908.

Both Kitson power units were purchased by the Sanderson and Grant sawmill at Forrest in 1907. Sanderson had previously tried to purchased them in 1901 and again in 1904. They were converted to 3 ft 6 in (1,067 mm) gauge by narrowing the underframes and shortening the axles. One was involved in an accident on 21 November 1907 which killed Alexander Sanderson and his son Marshall. In 1919 one was taken out of use and its boiler used to power a winch. The other was withdrawn in 1923 and also used to power a winch.

== See also ==
- Kerr Stuart steam railmotor, Motor No.3 built using the experience from the Rowan Car.
