= Lužná (Rakovník District) =

- Municipality
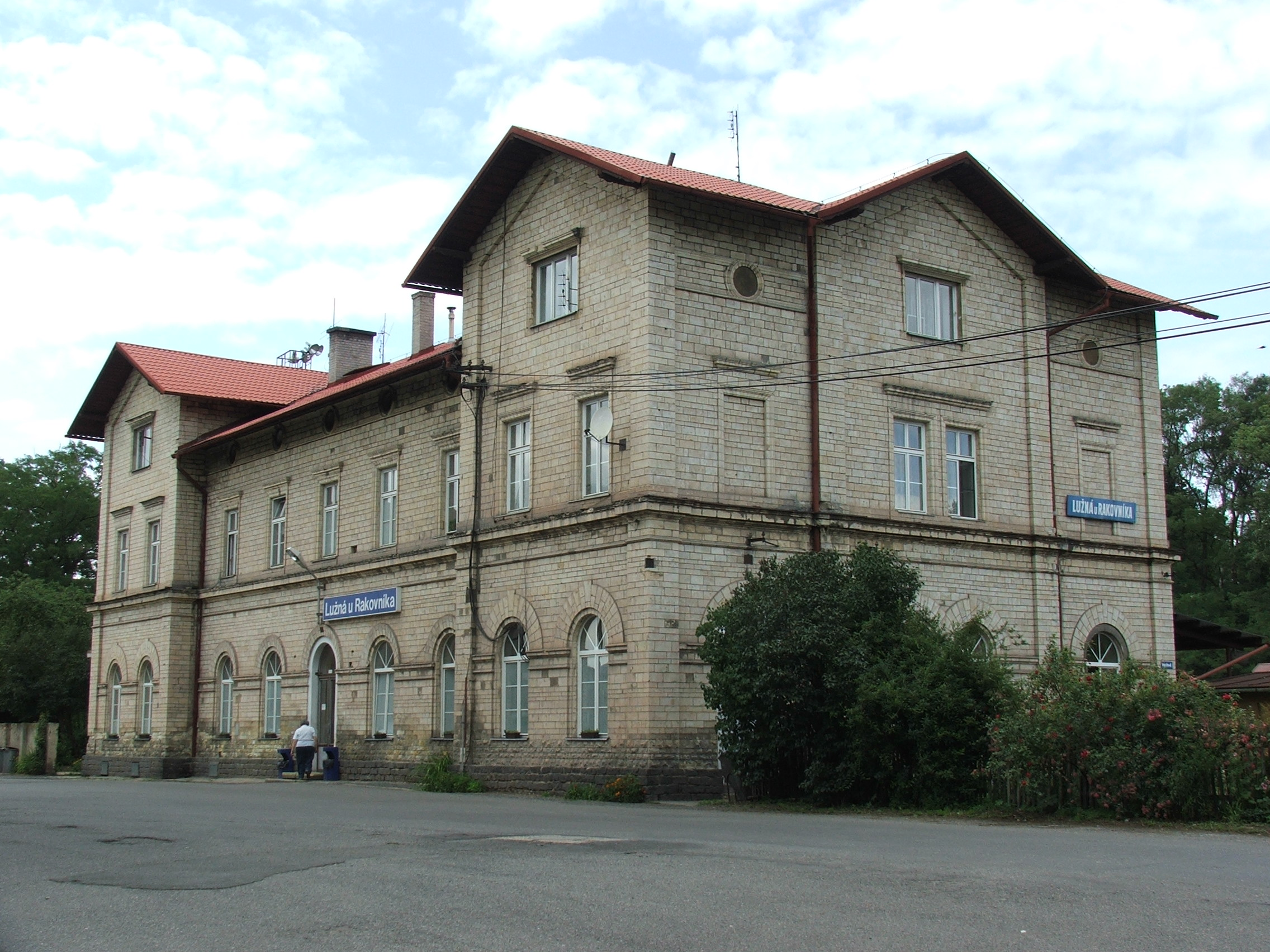
- Railway station

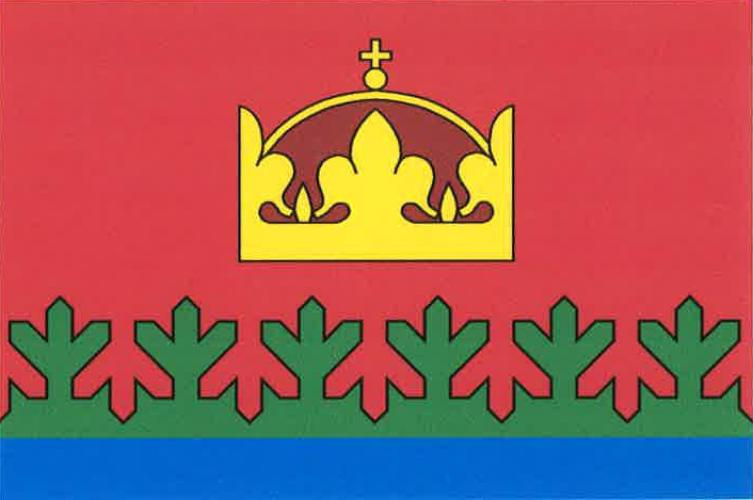
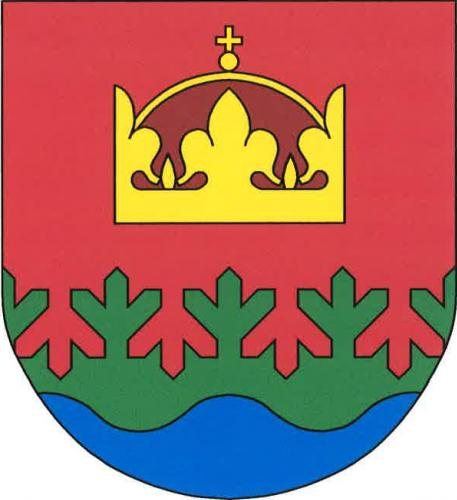
- Flag Coat of arms

- Location in the Czech Republic
- Coordinates: 50°7′26″N 13°46′12″E
- Country: Czech Republic
- Region: Central Bohemian
- District: Rakovník
- First mentioned: 1325

Area
  - Total: 29.78 km^{2} (11.50 sq mi)
- Elevation: 348 m (1,142 ft)

Population (2026-01-01)
  - Total: 1,988
  - Density: 66.76/km^{2} (172.9/sq mi)
- Time zone: UTC+1 (CET)
  - Summer (DST): UTC+2 (CEST)
- Postal code: 270 51
- Website: www.luzna.cz

Lužná is a municipality and village in Rakovník District in the Central Bohemian Region of the Czech Republic. It has about 2,000 inhabitants.

== Etymology ==
The name is derived from the Czech word luh, which denotes a meadow on a wet soil.

== Geography ==
Lužná is located about 3 kilometres (2 mi) northeast of Rakovník and 40 km (25 mi) west of Prague. The built-up area lies in the Rakovník Uplands, but the eastern part of the municipal territory lies in the Křivoklát Highlands. The highest point is at 500 m (1,600 ft) above sea level. Part of the municipality is situated in the Křivoklátsko Protected Landscape Area.

== History ==
The first written mention of Lužná is from 1325, when it obtained a privilege from King John of Bohemia.

== Demographics ==
Historical population

Year	Pop.	±%
1869	1,403	—
1880	1,239	−11.7%
1890	1,276	+3.0%
1900	1,448	+13.5%
1910	1,713	+18.3%

Year	Pop.	±%
1921	1,801	+5.1%
1930	2,101	+16.7%
1950	1,764	−16.0%
1961	2,110	+19.6%
1970	1,988	−5.8%

Year	Pop.	±%
1980	1,827	−8.1%
1991	1,793	−1.9%
2001	1,804	+0.6%
2011	1,787	−0.9%
2021	1,928	+7.9%

Source: Censuses

== Transport ==
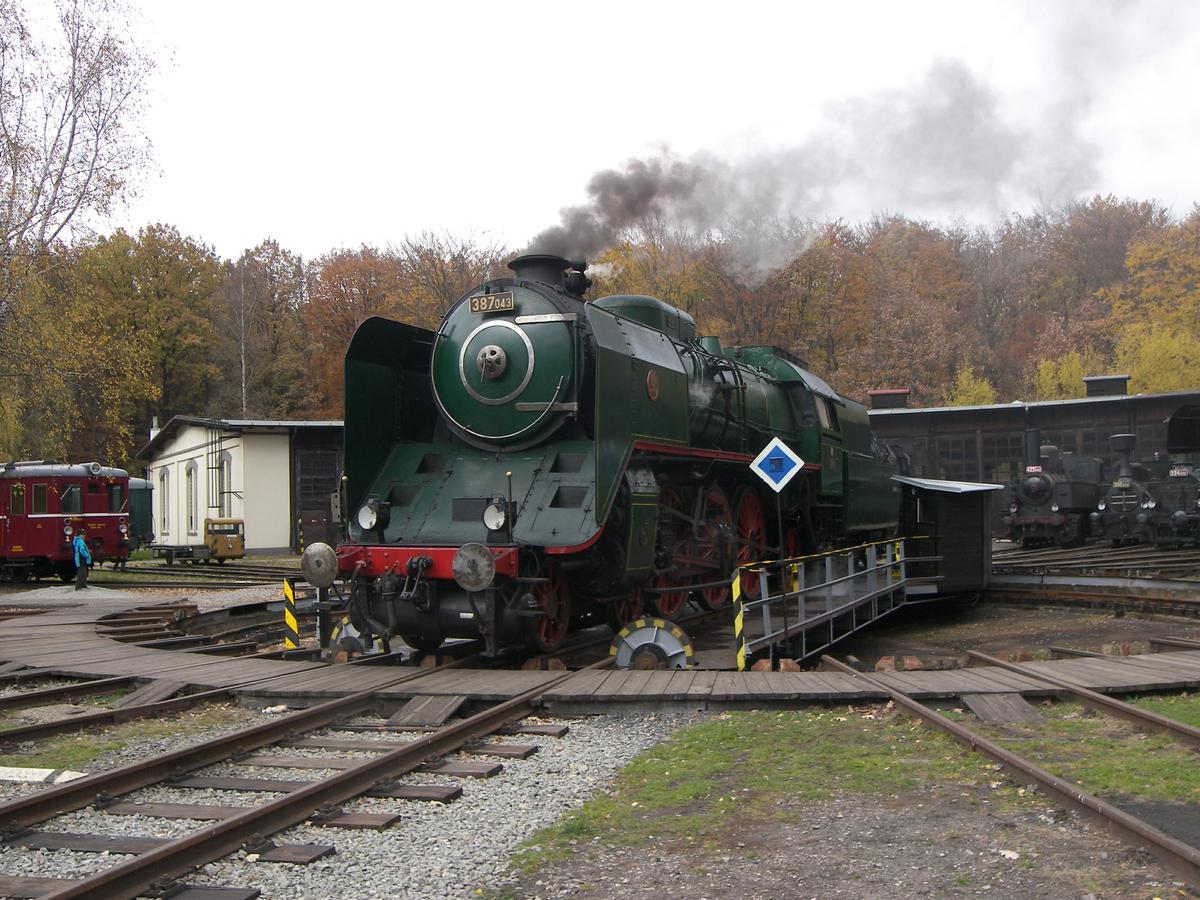
Railway museum

Lužná is located on the railway line Prague–Rakovník via Kladno.

== Sights ==
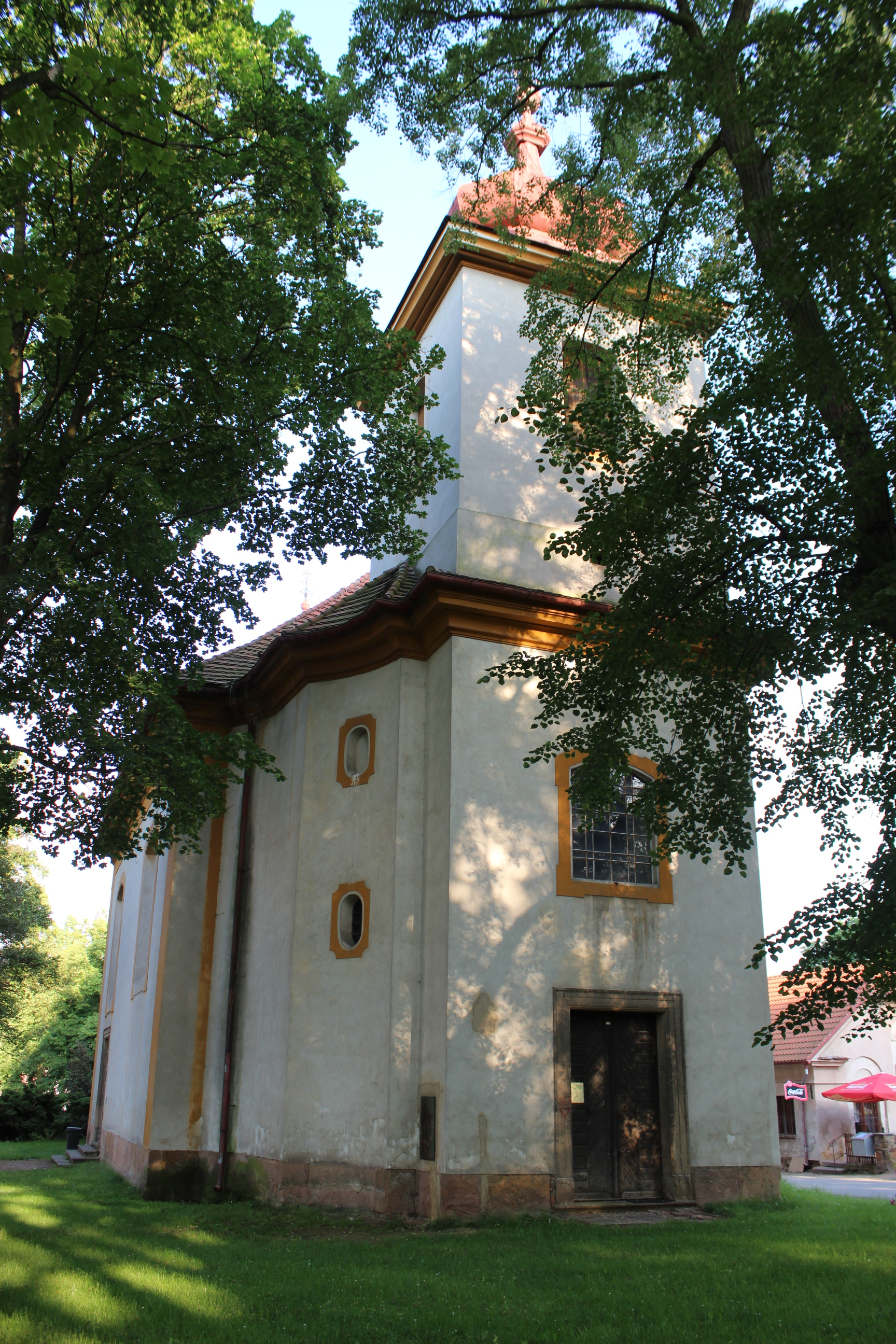
Church of St. Barbara

The Church of Saint Barbara is the landmark of the centre of Lužná. It is a valuable late Baroque church, built in 1750–1758. it replaced an old Gothic church from the first half of the 14th century.

The České dráhy Museum opened in 1999. It is located near the Lužná railway station and it is the largest railway museum in the Czech Republic.

JK Classics is a museum of American vintage cars. It was founded in 2015 and features 80 exhibits.
