= ČSD Class 387.0 =

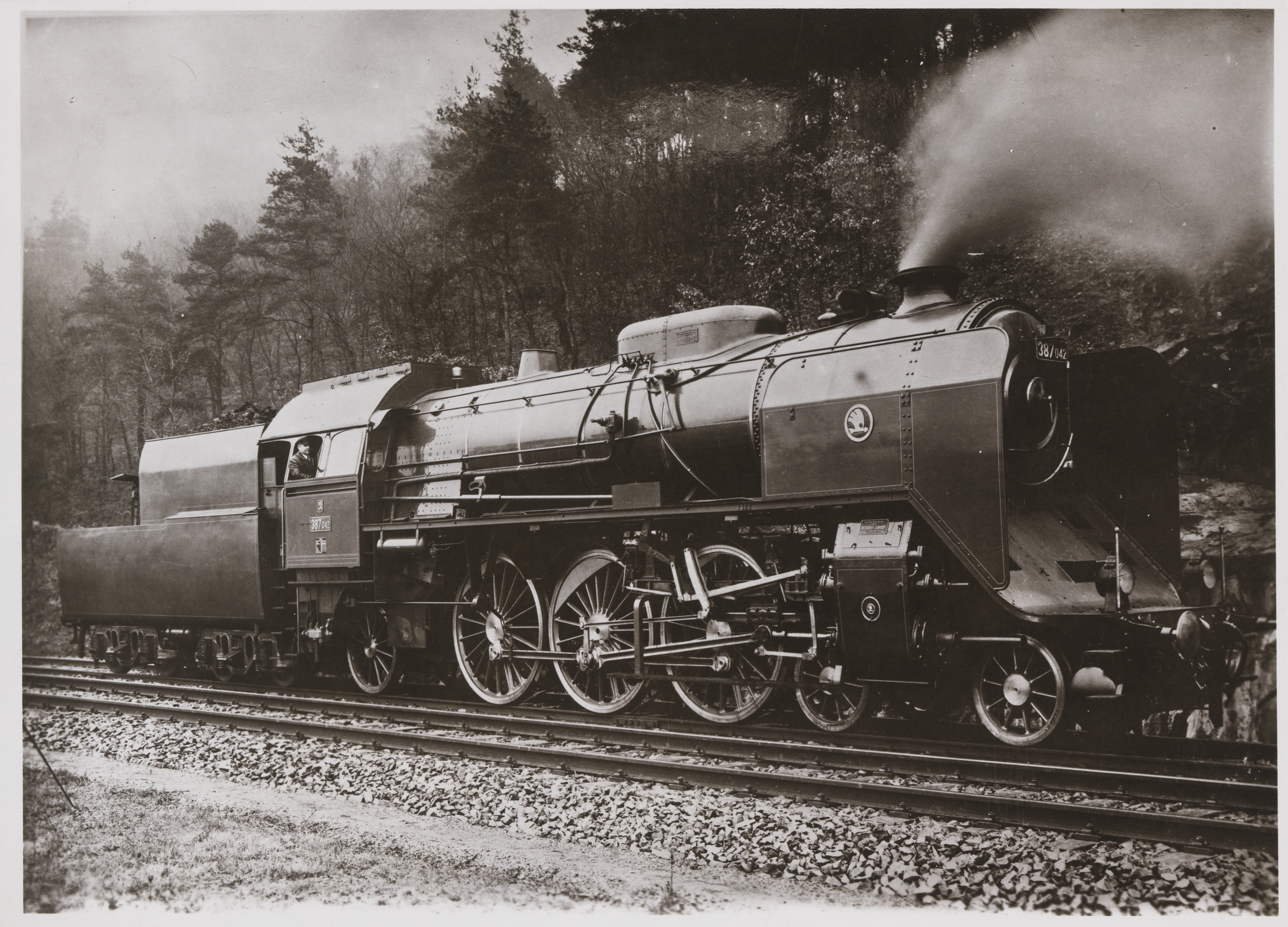
- 387.042
Type and origin
- Power type: Steam
- Builder: Škoda Works, Plzeň
- Build date: 1926–1937
- Total produced: 43
Specifications
- Configuration
  - Whyte: 4-6-2
  - UIC: 2′C1 h3
- Gauge: 1,435 mm (4 ft 8 1/2 in)
- Leading dia.: 1,044 mm (3 ft 5 in)
- Driver dia.: 1,950 mm (6 ft 5 in)
- Trailing dia.: 1,308 mm (4 ft 3 in)
- Loco weight: 89.6–92.6 tonnes, depending on the batch.
- Fuel type: Coal
- Boiler pressure: 13 bar (189 lbf/in^{2})
- Cylinders: Three
- Cylinder size: 525 mm × 680 mm (20.67 in × 26.77 in) or 500 mm × 680 mm (19.69 in × 26.77 in)
Performance figures
- Maximum speed: 110 or 120 km/h (68 or 75 mph), depending on the batch.
- Tractive effort: 109.00 or 98.89 kN (24,504 or 22,231 lbf)
Career
- Operators: Czechoslovak State Railways (Československé státní dráhy, ČSD)
- Numbers: 387.001 to 387.043
- Retired: 1967–1974
- Disposition: One preserved, remainder scrapped

The ČSD Class 387.0 were 4-6-2 express passenger steam locomotives operated by the Czechoslovak State Railways (Československé státní dráhy, ČSD) between 1926 and 1974. Forty-three of these 2,100-horsepower (1,570 kW) pacific locomotives were built by Škoda Works, Plzeň in five series between 1926 and 1937. They were intended for the heaviest long-distance express trains.

== History ==
The Czechoslovak state railway looked attentively at the operating and service costs, and decided to order a three-cylinder single-expansion engine with axle load up to 16 tonnes, which could operate on all main lines. The result didn't exactly meet the original proposal, because of a higher axle load (17 tonnes), but the locomotive was great step forward in the construction of steam locomotives in Czechoslovakia.

== Design ==
The frame is of the girder type, cast of vanadium steel. The twin-axle leading bogie has side play of ±80 mm (3.15 in), the rear truck of Adams type ±60 mm (2.36 in). The centre coupled axle, which is the driving one, has its flange reduced by 10 mm (0.39 in) to allow negotiate curves of 160 m (525 ft) radius. The springs of the coupled axles and trailing truck are mounted above the axle boxes and are mutually joined by means of rockers.

The three cylinder steam engine has cranks arranged at ±120° and the central cylinder has inclination 1:10. Cylinders have a bore of 525 mm (20.67 in) (500 mm or 19.69 in for the 5th series) and stroke of 680 mm (26.77 in). Pistons and piston valves are made of aluminium and have hollow rods for to keep the weight in desirable limits. The boost compensator was self-acting, Winterthur type.

The valve gear is of the Heusinger type, with internal link motion driven by flycrank on the left wheel of the rear coupled axle. This arrangement proved itself very reliable in contrast to maintenance problems with the Gresley conjugated valve gear and was used for all subsequent Czechoslovak three-cylinder locomotives except of one series (Class 486.1).

The boiler is impressive: the centre line is 3,225 mm (10 ft 7 in) above the rail and consisted of two rings, 1,817 and 1,850 mm (71.5 and 72.8 in) in diameter respectively. The cylindrical boiler, which had 158 large flue-tubes and 53 small flue-tubes 5,250 mm (17 ft 3 in) long, had a heating surface of 242.5 square metres (2,610 sq ft). In the smokebox, which is 2,755 mm (9 ft 0 in) long, was located a small tube superheater with a heating surface of 93 m^{2} (1,000 sq ft). The copper firebox had grate area of 4.8 m^{2} (52 sq ft) and a heating surface of 17.5 m^{2} (188 sq ft). The steam dome with throttle valve was on the first boiler ring and was cowled together with pneumatically operated sandbox. The safety valve was of Pop-Coale type cowled together on the firebox; the maximal pressure was 13 bar (189 lbf/in^{2}).

The first batch (Nos 1 to 6) had the vacuum brake and the air-compressed brake for both the locomotive and train as well; subsequent batches (1930 onwards) were fitted without vacuum brake. Tachometer was of Hausshälter-Rezsny type, the lighting by means of acetylene, which changed from the second batch (Nos 7 to 11) to TELOC tachometer and electric lighting. Other changes and improvements were:

- From the third batch onwards: (Nos 12 to 21) there were four arch tubes in the firebox, hence the heating surface got larger to 19.8 m^{2} (213 sq ft)
- From the third batch onwards: large tube superheater was used with heating surface 64.4 m^{2} (693 sq ft).
- From the third batch onwards: the cylindrical boiler had 126 large flue-tubes and 35 small flue-tubes with heating surface 206.2 m^{2} (2,220 sq ft).
- From the third batch onwards: smoke deflectorswere fitted, as seen on the picture.
- The fourth batch: (Nos 22 to 33) the maximum speed was 120 km/h (75 mph).

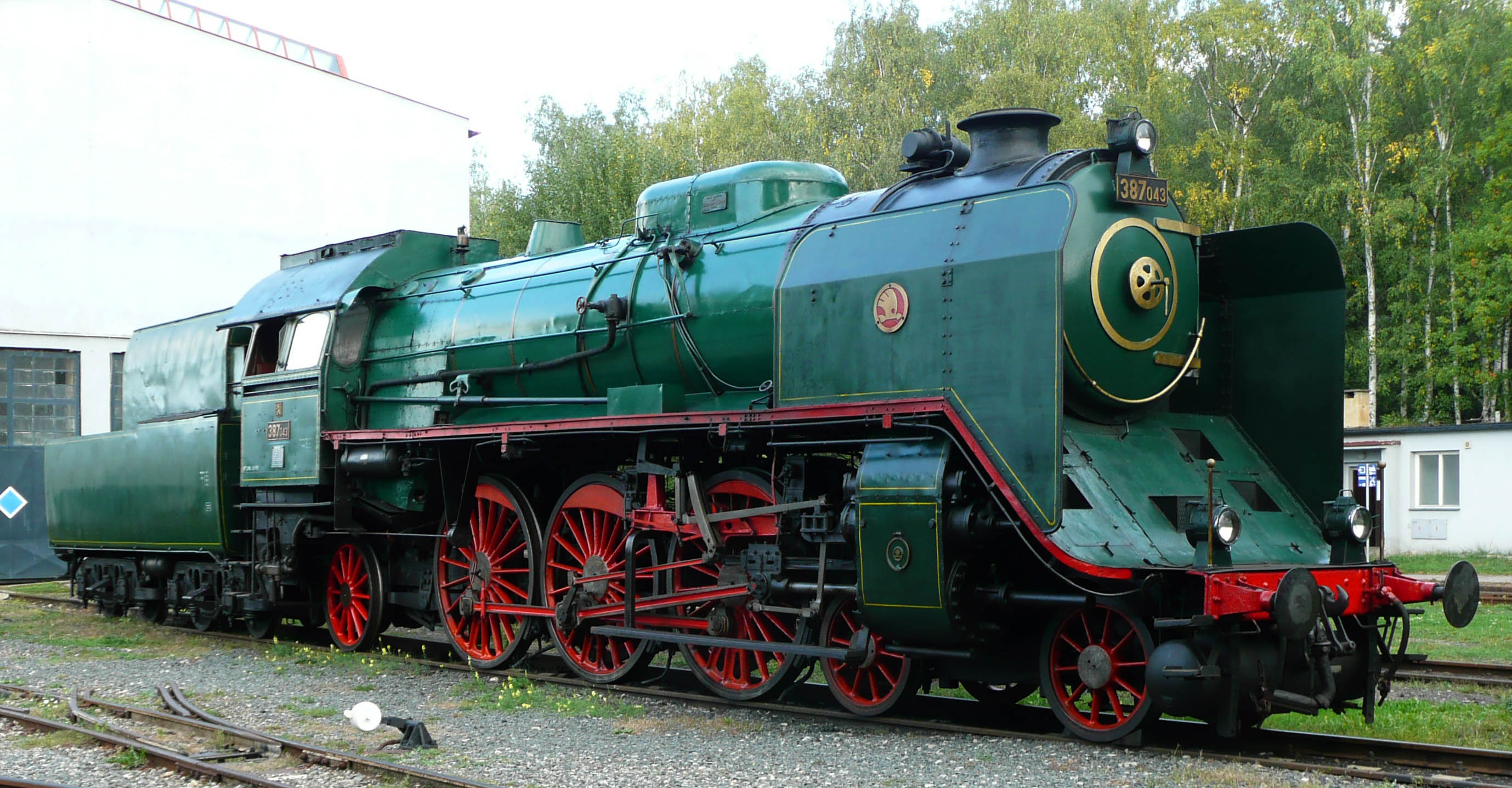
Preserved 387.043 at Lužná u Rakovníka Museum

As the locomotives progressed through the workshops for repairs all of these improvements were retrofitted. After 1945 copper fireboxes were changed for steel ones, there were fitted Houlson grates and the arrangement of cylindrical boiler was also changed (134 large flue-tubes and 33 small flue-tubes with heating surface 230.1 m^{2} or 2,477 sq ft, large tube superheater with heating surface 60.1 m^{2} or 647 sq ft) and maximum speed was united at 110 km/h (68 mph).

Piston valves were newly of Trofimov type and except of Nos 13, 14, 16, 18, 24, 26, 32, 34, 35, 36, 37, 38, 39 and 43 were Kylchap exhaust system fitted.

The locomotive weight is 89.6–92.6 tonnes (88.2–91.1 long tons; 98.8–102.1 short tons); maximum speed of 110 km/h (68 mph) was probably because of either length of track sections between semaphores, or safety with variable quality of the track. According to Mr. František Vrátil, former dispatcher in Choceň, the class was able to reach 150 km/h (93 mph). The class is said to have been 'among the most successful locomotives' in Europe. The locomotives started to be retired in 1967, with last one being retired in 1974. One example, 387.043, has been preserved.

Tenders were of series 923.0, 930.0 and 930.1
