= 0-4-0+4 =

Locomotive wheel arrangement

- Front of locomotive at left

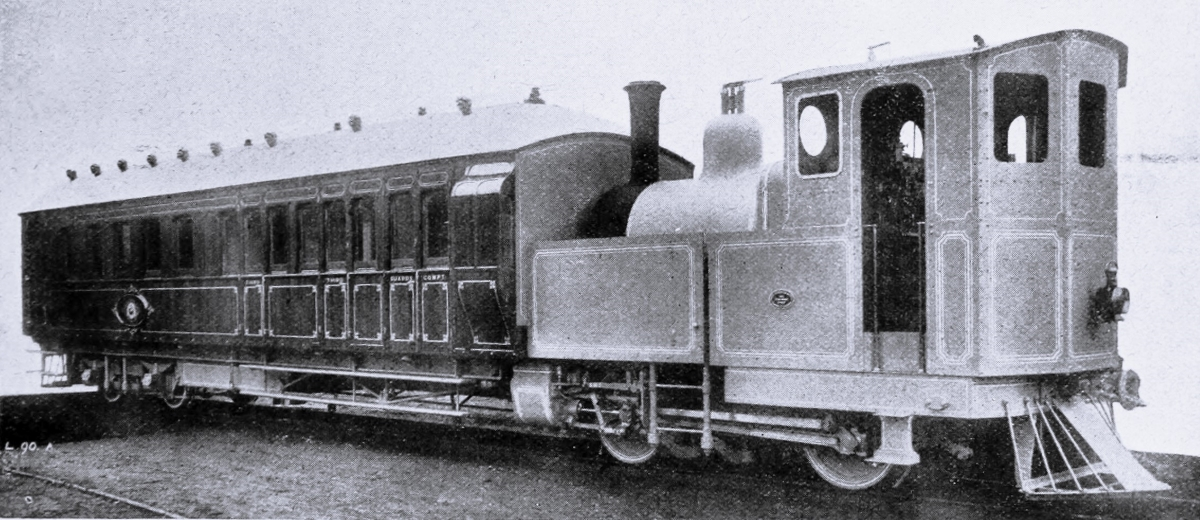
- Cape Government Railways Railmotor
Equivalent classifications
- UIC class: B2'
- French class: 020+2
- Turkish class: 2/4
- Swiss class: 24
- Russian class: 0-2-0+2
First known tank engine version
- First use: c. 1848
- Country: United Kingdom
- Designer: William Bridges Adams
- Builder: William Bridges Adams

Under the Whyte notation for the classification of steam locomotives, 0-4-0+4 represents the wheel arrangement of no leading wheels, four powered and coupled driving wheels on two axles and four trailing wheels on two axles mounted in a bogie.

== Overview ==
The 0-4-0+4 wheel arrangement was usually found on railmotors, vehicles for passenger carrying that operated on routes where passenger numbers were light. It usually consisted of a single coach with its own prime mover. William Bridges Adams in the United Kingdom began building railmotors in small numbers as early as 1848.

== Usage ==
=== Cape of Good Hope ===
A single Railmotor was delivered to the Cape Government Railways (CGR) in 1906. The railmotor was a self-contained motor-coach in which the locomotive and coach were embodied in a single vehicle, with a driver's station at the rear end of the coach for reverse running. The locomotive part was a 0-4-0 side-tank engine which was built by North British Locomotive Company, while the coach part on a single bogie was built by Metropolitan Amalgamated Railway Carriage & Wagon.

=== Transvaal Colony ===
In 1907, the Central South African Railways (CSAR) acquired a single self-contained railmotor for the low-volume railmotor passenger service which had been introduced the previous year. It was a self-contained motor-coach with a 56-seat capacity in which the engine, boiler and coach were embodied in a single vehicle. While the engine part of the vehicle was built by Kitson & Co, the 46 feet 11 inches (14,300 millimetres) long coach part was constructed by Metropolitan Amalgamated Railway Carriage & Wagon. To negotiate curves and points, the power unit could pivot like a bogie. The railmotor was erected at the Salt River shops of the CGR in Cape Town and entered service on the CSAR on 10 August 1907.
