= Lodge Hill railway station =

Former railway station in England

Lodge Hill

General information
- Location: Westbury-sub-Mendip, Somerset; England
- Coordinates: 51.2330°N 2.7195°W

Other information
- Status: Disused

History
- Original company: Bristol and Exeter Railway
- Pre-grouping: Great Western Railway
- Post-grouping: Great Western Railway

Key dates
- 5 April 1870: Opened
- 9 September 1963: Closed
Location

Lodge Hill railway station was on the Bristol and Exeter Railway's Cheddar Valley line in Somerset from 1870 until 1963. The station served the village of Westbury-sub-Mendip, but was not named Westbury because of the potential for confusion with Westbury, Wiltshire.

== History ==
The station was opened with the extension of the broad gauge line from Cheddar to Wells in April 1870, converted to standard gauge in the mid-1870s and then linked up to the East Somerset Railway to provide through services from Yatton to Witham in 1878. All the railways involved were absorbed into the Great Western Railway in the 1870s.

The station was host to a GWR camping coach from 1938 to 1939. A camping coach was also positioned here by the Western Region in 1952.

The Yatton to Witham line closed to passengers in 1963, though goods traffic passed through to Cheddar until 1969.

Preceding station	Disused railways	Following station
Draycott; Line and station closed	Cheddar Valley Railway; Great Western Railway	Wookey; Line and station closed

== After closure ==
For a period Bristol Grammar School used the station buildings as an activity centre, but it was later demolished to make way for housing. Stone from the building was used in the construction of buildings at Cranmore on the preserved East Somerset Railway.

Until 2002, the former track bed at the station was used as an airfield for light aircraft.
