= Winscombe railway station =

Former railway station in Somerset, England

Coordinates: 51°18′55″N 2°50′07″W

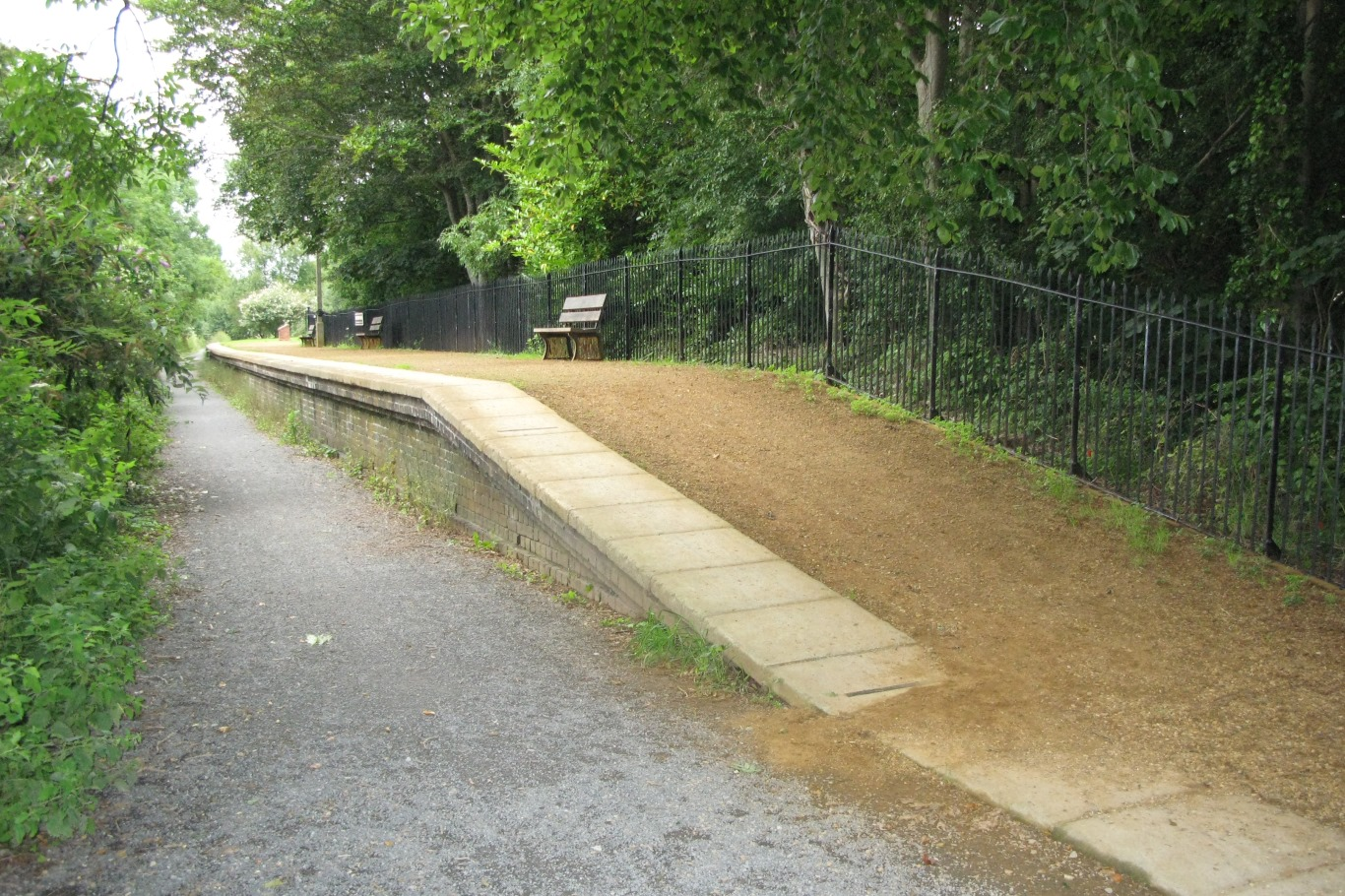
The restored platform, now part of the Millennium Green at Winscombe.

Winscombe railway station was a station on the Bristol and Exeter Railway's Cheddar Valley line in Winscombe, Somerset.

The station was opened as "Woodborough" with the broad gauge line to Cheddar on 3 August 1869 as a single-platform station. It was renamed "Winscombe" on 1 December 1869. The railway was extended to Wells in 1870, converted to standard gauge in the mid-1870s and then linked up to the East Somerset Railway to provide through services from Yatton to Witham in 1878. All the railways involved were absorbed into the Great Western Railway in the 1870s.

Winscombe was originally a small wooden building, unlike the substantial Bristol and Exeter design stone buildings provided for other stations on the line. This was replaced in 1905 with a standard GWR building with a large canopy. The station had "Somerset" added to its name from 12 January 1906.

The station was host to a GWR camp coach from 1935 to 1939. A camping coach was also positioned here by the Western Region from 1952 to 1960.

The Yatton to Witham line closed to passengers in September 1963 and Yatton-Cheddar closed to goods in October 1964. Winscombe station was demolished, but in recent years the platform has been reinstated with GWR seats and railings as a feature on the Cheddar Valley Railway Walk.

== Services ==
Preceding station	Disused railways	Following station
Sandford and Banwell; Line and station closed	Cheddar Valley Railway; Great Western Railway	Axbridge; Line and station closed
