= Draycott railway station =

Former railway station in England

Coordinates: 51°15′10″N 2°45′17″W

Draycott
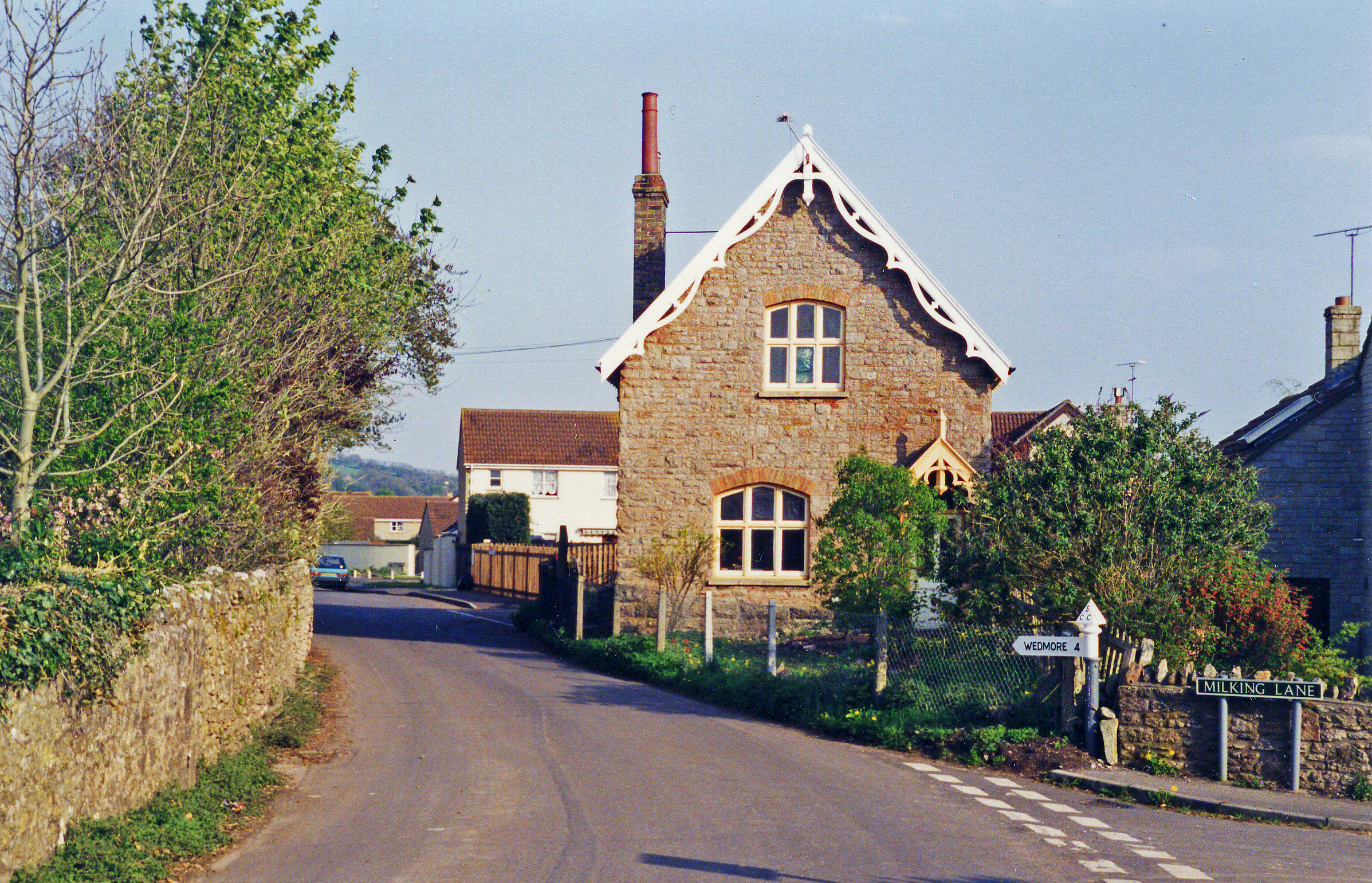
- The remains of the station in 1995

General information
- Location: Draycott, Somerset; England
- Grid reference: ST474506

Other information
- Status: Disused

History
- Original company: Bristol and Exeter Railway
- Pre-grouping: Great Western Railway
- Post-grouping: Great Western Railway

Key dates
- 5 April 1870: Opened
- 9 September 1963: Closed
Location

Draycott railway station was a station on the Bristol and Exeter Railway's Cheddar Valley line in Draycott, Somerset.

The station was opened with the extension of the broad gauge line from Cheddar to Wells in April 1870, converted to standard gauge in the mid-1870s and then linked up to the East Somerset Railway to provide through services from Yatton to Witham in 1878. All the railways involved were absorbed into the Great Western Railway in the 1870s.

The Yatton to Witham line closed to passengers in 1963, though goods traffic passed through to Cheddar until 1969. Draycott station, one of the smaller stations on the line, is now in residential use and still boasts many of the original Bristol and Exeter Railway features.

== Services ==
Preceding station	Disused railways	Following station
Cheddar	Great Western Railway; Cheddar Valley Railway	Lodge Hill
