= Cheddar railway station =

Former railway station in England

Cheddar
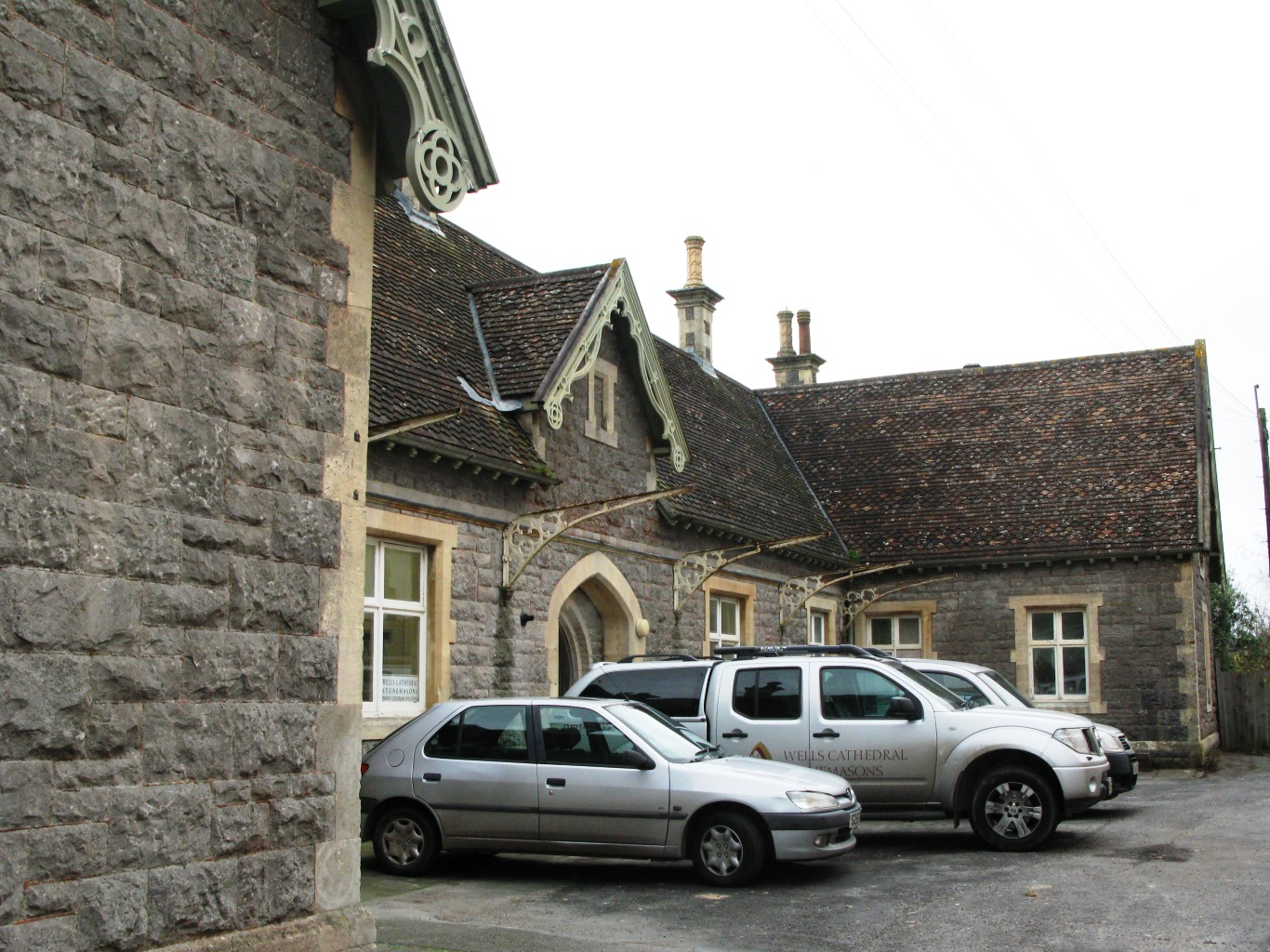

General information
- Location: Cheddar, Somerset; England
- Coordinates: 51.2757°N 2.7841°W
- Grid reference: ST454532
- Platforms: 2

Other information
- Status: Disused

History
- Original company: Bristol and Exeter Railway
- Pre-grouping: Great Western Railway
- Post-grouping: Great Western Railway

Key dates
- 1869: opened
- 1963: closed for passengers
- 1965: closed for freight
- 1969: closed entirely
Location

Cheddar railway station was a station on the Bristol and Exeter Railway's Cheddar Valley line in Cheddar, Somerset, England. The station had substantial goods traffic based on the locally-grown strawberries, which led to the line's alternative name as The Strawberry Line.

== History ==
The station was opened as the temporary terminus of the broad gauge line in August 1869. The railway was extended to Wells in 1870, converted to standard gauge in the mid-1870s and then linked up to the East Somerset Railway to provide through services from Yatton to Witham in 1878. All the railways involved were absorbed into the Great Western Railway in the 1870s.

Cheddar was the largest station on the line, with a big station building and an all-over roof that covered both platforms. The station was host to a GWR camp coach from 1935 to 1939. A camping coach was also positioned here by the Western Region from 1952 to 1963 (except for 1953).

The Yatton to Witham line closed to passengers in 1963. Cheddar remained open for goods until November 1965, and even then a private siding kept the line in place until March 1969.

Most of the station buildings still exist in other uses, but the overall roof was taken down soon after the passenger service was withdrawn.

== Services ==
Preceding station	Disused railways	Following station
Axbridge	Great Western Railway; Cheddar Valley Railway	Draycott
