= Sandford and Banwell railway station =

Former railway station in England

Coordinates: 51°19′55″N 2°50′22″W

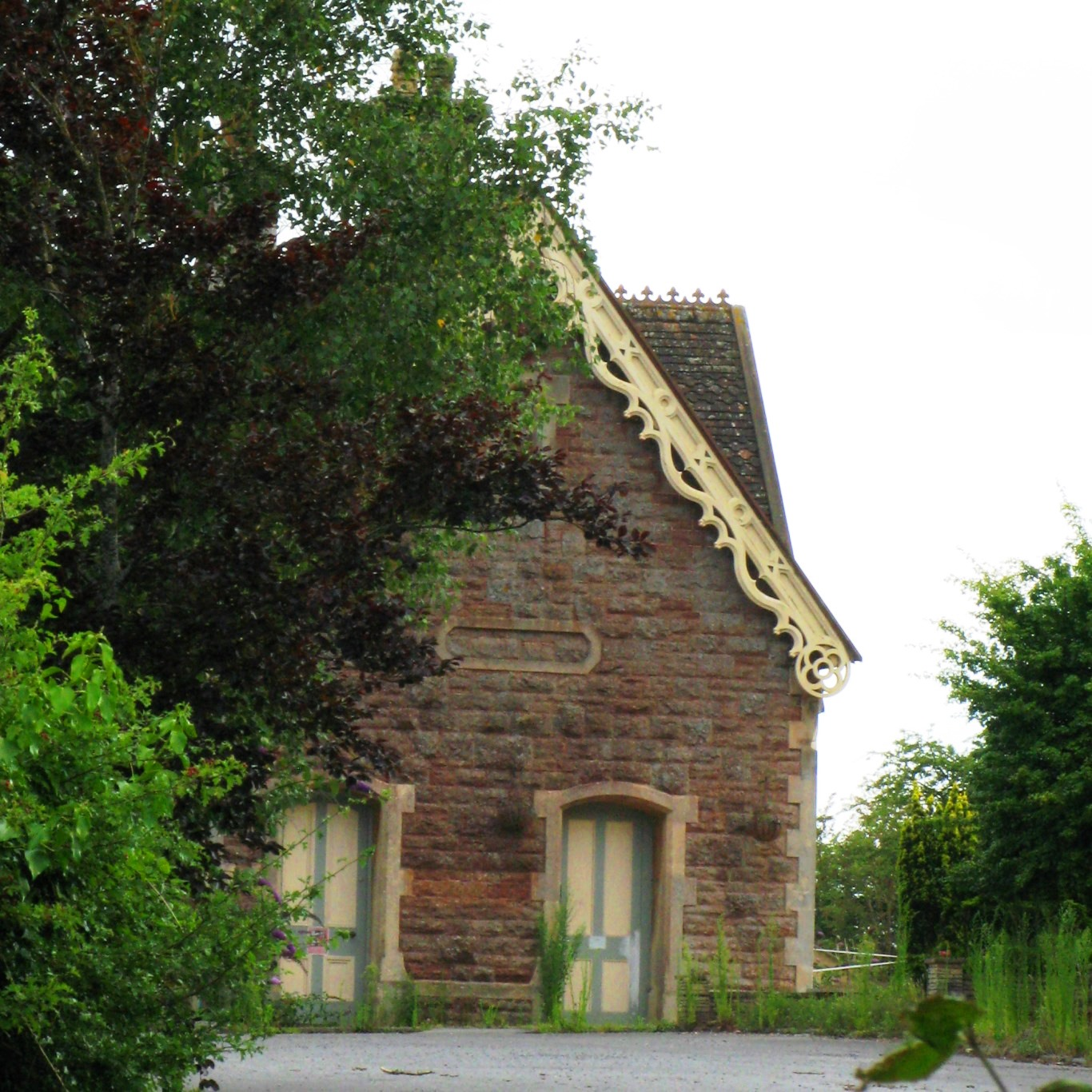
Sandford and Banwell railway station before restoration.

Sandford and Banwell railway station was a station on the Bristol and Exeter Railway's Cheddar Valley line in Sandford, Somerset, England. The station is a Grade II listed building.

The station can be viewed from the Strawberry Line Trail, which runs adjacent to the site.

== History ==
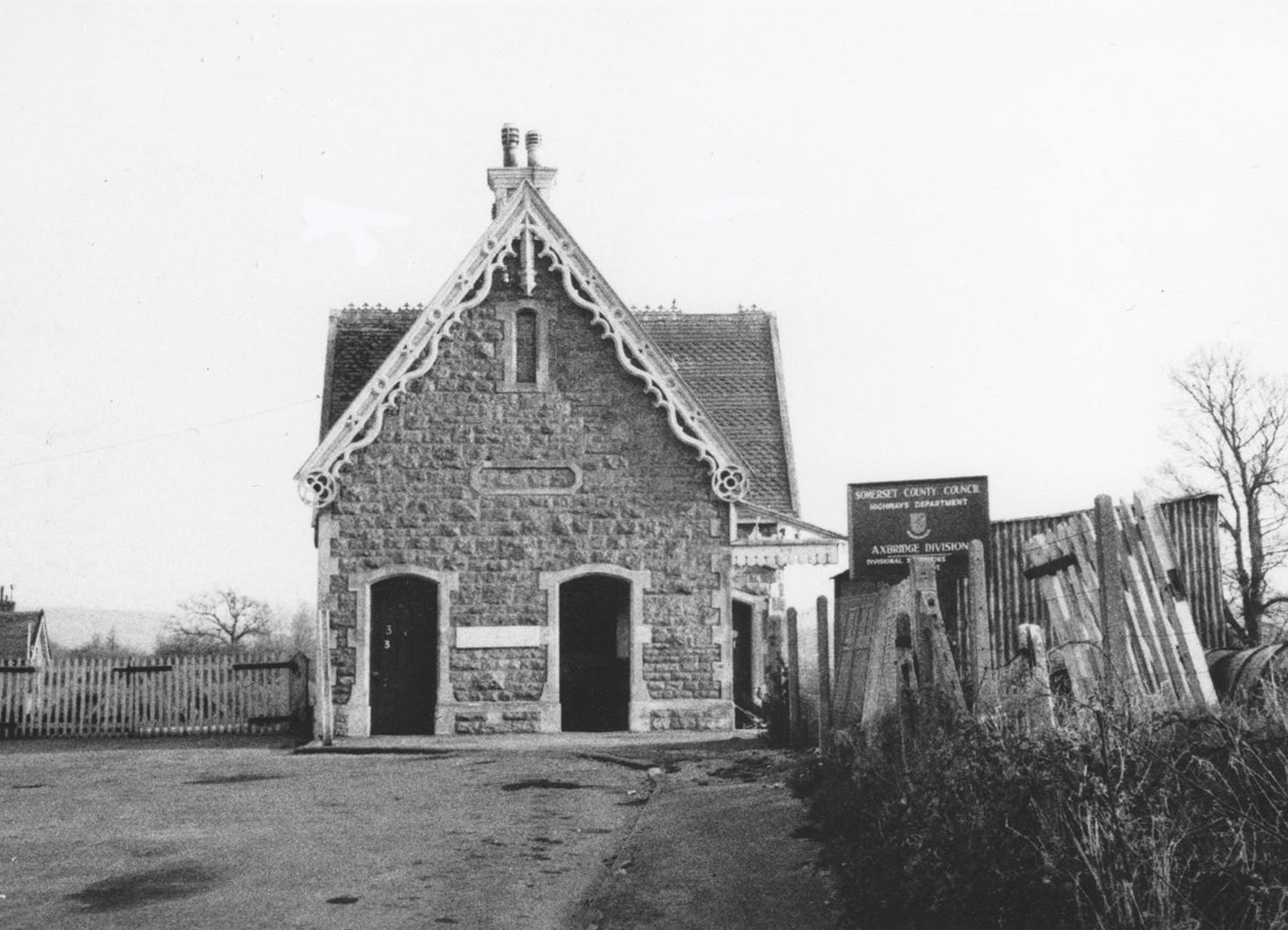
Late 1960s: Highways depot

The station was opened as Sandford with the broad gauge line to Cheddar in August 1869 as a single-platform station. The railway was extended to Wells in 1870, converted to standard gauge in the mid-1870s and then linked up to the East Somerset Railway to provide through services from Yatton to Witham in 1878. All the railways involved were absorbed into the Great Western Railway in the 1870s.

The Yatton to Witham line closed to passengers in September 1963 and Yatton-Cheddar closed to goods in October 1964. Sandford and Banwell station was used initially by Somerset County Council highways department for storage and was later taken over by a local company, Sandford Stone, which kept it well-preserved until going into liquidation. The site has since been redeveloped as "Sandford Station Care Village" a sheltered housing complex. Two period open wagons and a BR coach stand on a short section of track.

Part of the restoration work included the reinstatement of a number of original features of the station including a replica cast iron running in board that was cast at Barr and Grosvenor's foundry in Wolverhampton.

== Services ==
Preceding station	Disused railways	Following station
Congresbury; Line and station closed	Cheddar Valley Railway; Great Western Railway	Winscombe; Line and station closed
