= Congresbury railway station =

Former railway station in England

Coordinates: 51.3707°N 2.8178°W

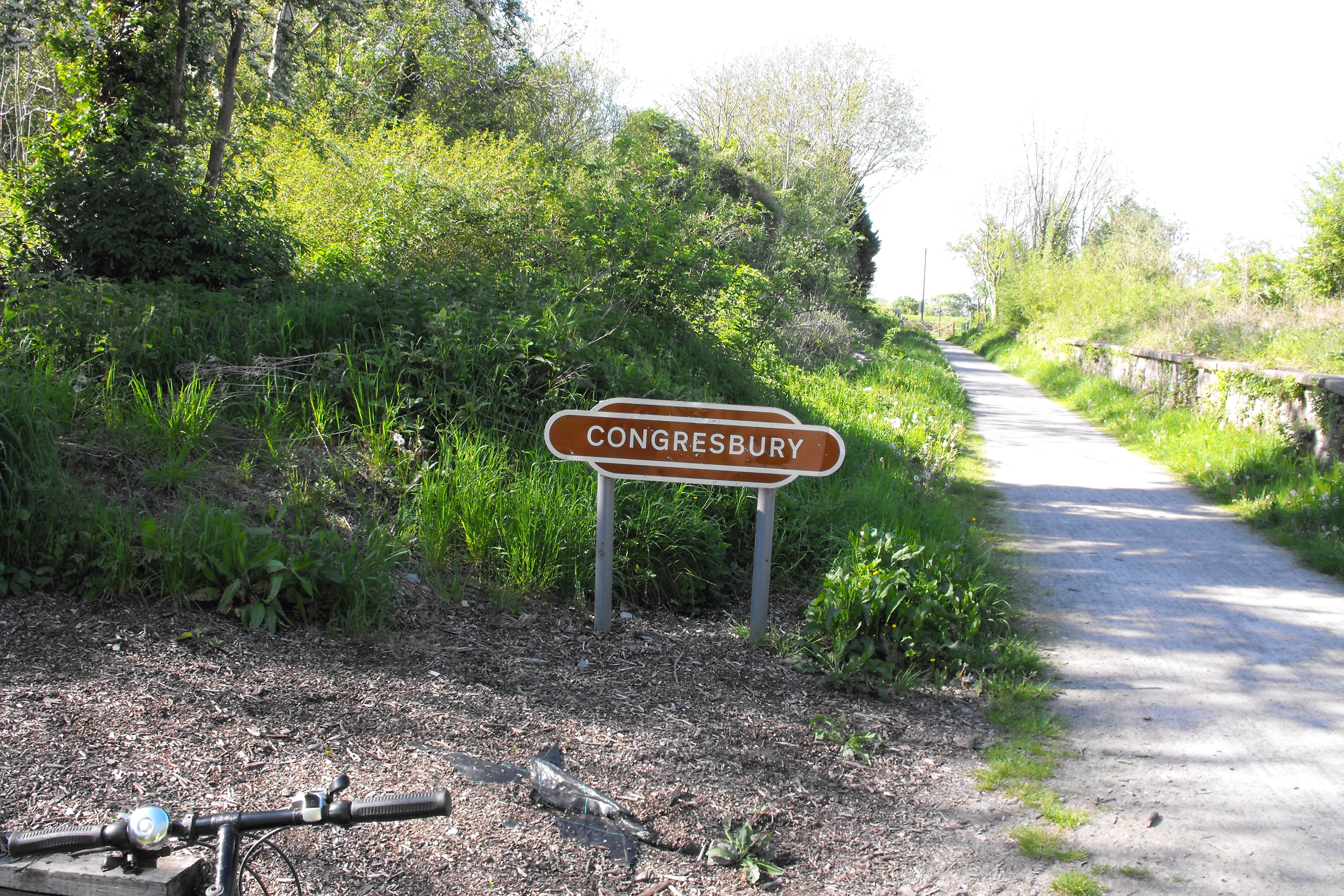
North facing view of the station seen in 2012

Congresbury railway station was a station located at Congresbury on the Bristol and Exeter Railway's Cheddar Valley line in Somerset and the junction for the Wrington Vale Light Railway to Blagdon.

The station was opened with the broad gauge line to Cheddar on 3 August 1869 as a single-platform station. The railway was extended to Wells in 1870, converted to standard gauge in the mid-1870s and then linked up to the East Somerset Railway to provide through services from Yatton to Witham in 1878.

Congresbury was remodelled as a two-platform station when the Wrington Vale line opened in 1901; with a few exceptions, though, trains on both lines started at Yatton, the junction with the main Bristol and Exeter line.

The station was host to a GWR camp coach from 1936 to 1939. A camping coach was also positioned here by the Western Region from 1952 to 1962.

The Wrington line shut to passenger traffic on 14 September 1931. The Yatton to Witham line closed to passengers on 9 September 1963. Congresbury remained opened for goods traffic for a few further months, closing on 1 October 1964. The station was later demolished, though traces of the platforms can be seen on the Strawberry Line Trail.

== Services ==
Preceding station	Disused railways	Following station
Yatton	Great Western Railway; Cheddar Valley Railway	Sandford and Banwell
Yatton	Great Western Railway; Wrington Vale Light Railway	Wrington
