= Langford railway station, Somerset =

Disused railway station in Langford, North Somerset

Langford
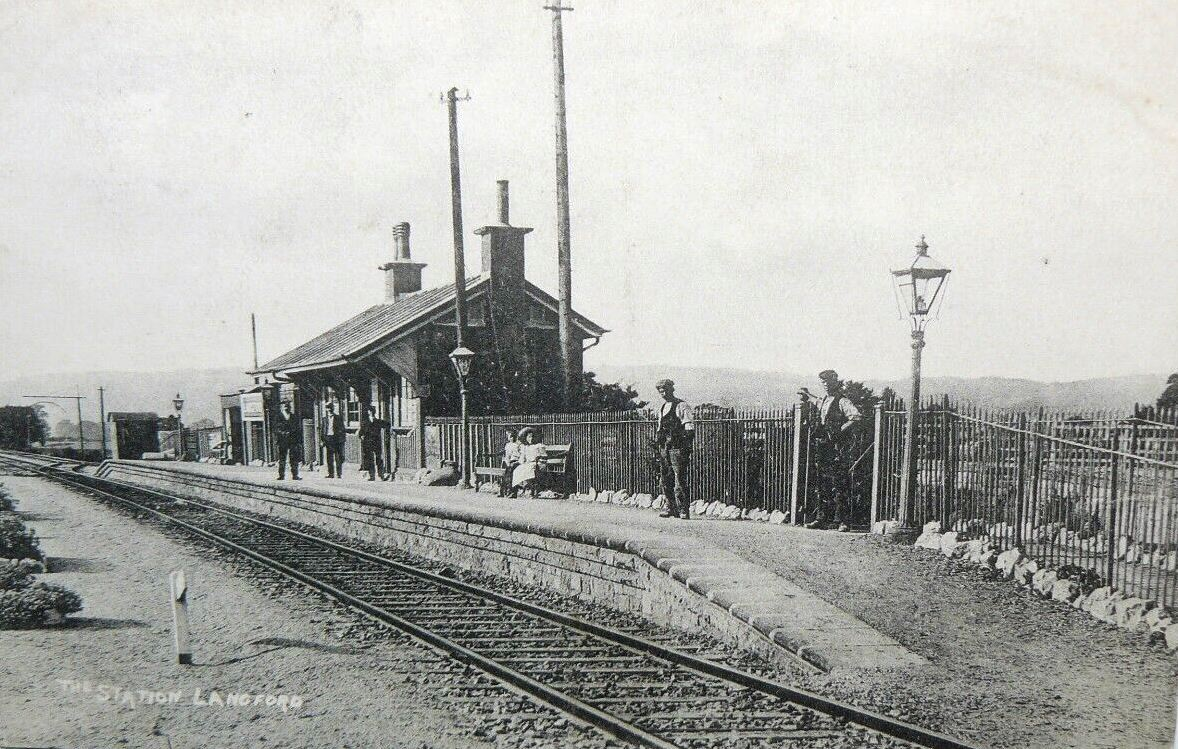

General information
- Location: Lower Langford, North Somerset; England
- Coordinates: 51.3412°N 2.7588°W
- Grid reference: ST472605
- Platforms: 1

Other information
- Status: Disused

History
- Original company: Great Western Railway
- Pre-grouping: Great Western
- Post-grouping: Great Western Railway

Key dates
- 4 December 1901: Opened
- 14 September 1931: Closed
Location

Langford railway station served the village of Lower Langford, North Somerset, England, from 1901 to 1931 on the Wrington Vale Light Railway.

== History ==
The station was opened on 4 December 1901 by the Great Western Railway. It closed on 14 September 1931.

Preceding station	Disused railways	Following station
Wrington; Line and station closed	Great Western Railway; Wrington Vale Light Railway	Burrington; Line and station closed
