= Axbridge railway station =

Disused railway station in Axbridge, Somerset

Coordinates: 51°17′18″N 2°48′59″W

Axbridge
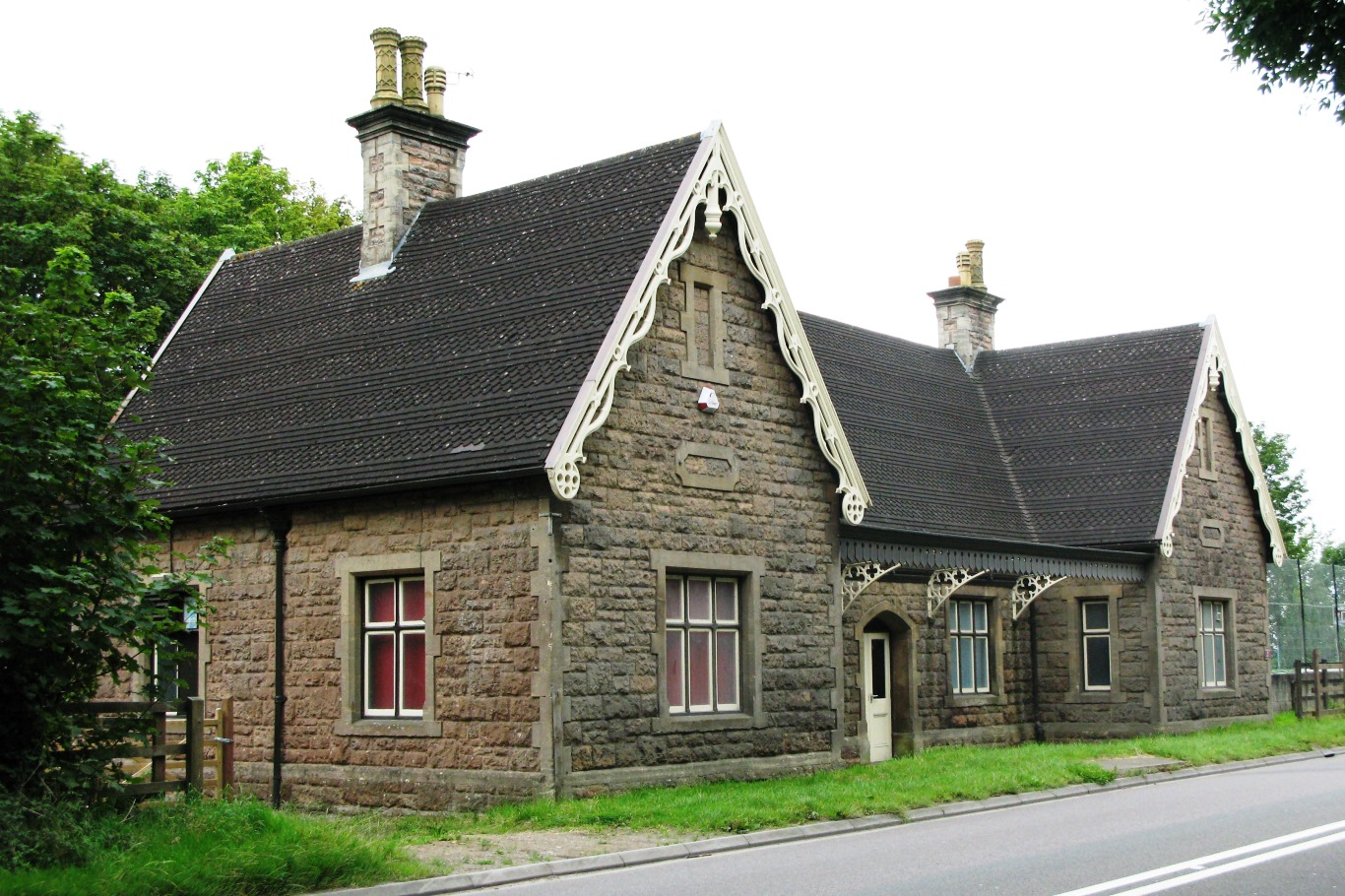

General information
- Location: Axbridge, Somerset; England

Other information
- Status: Disused

History
- Original company: Bristol and Exeter Railway
- Pre-grouping: Great Western Railway
- Post-grouping: Great Western Railway

Key dates
- 3 August 1869: Station opened
- 9 September 1963: Station closed
Location

Axbridge railway station was a station on the Bristol and Exeter Railway's Cheddar Valley line in Axbridge, Somerset. Axbridge was one of the principal stations for the transport of strawberries, which led to the line's alternative name as The Strawberry Line.

The station was opened with the broad gauge line to Cheddar in August 1869 as a two-platform station. The railway was extended to Wells in 1870, converted to standard gauge in the mid-1870s and then linked up to the East Somerset Railway to provide through services from Yatton to Witham in 1878. All the railways involved were absorbed into the Great Western Railway in the 1870s. This in turn was nationalised into the Western Region of British Railways on 1 January 1948.

== The site today ==
The Yatton to Witham line closed to passengers in September 1963 and Yatton-Cheddar closed to goods in October 1964. Axbridge station buildings, which are of a substantial Bristol and Exeter Railway design in local Mendip stone, have been used since as a youth centre and are in a good state of preservation. But instead of fronting on to the railway, they are now on the Axbridge bypass road, which uses the line of the old railway.

Preceding station	Historical railways	Following station
Winscombe; Line and station closed	Cheddar Valley Railway; Great Western Railway	Cheddar; Line and station closed
