= Burrington railway station =

Disused railway station in Burrington, North Somerset

Burrington
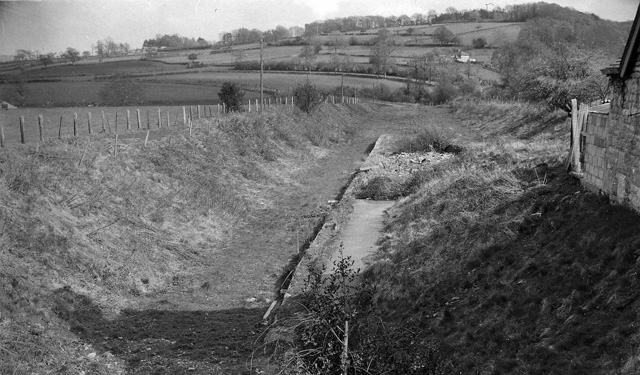
- The site of the station in 1963

General information
- Location: Burrington, North Somerset; England
- Coordinates: 51.334076°N 2.74466°W
- Grid reference: ST482597
- Platforms: 1

Other information
- Status: Disused

History
- Original company: Great Western Railway
- Pre-grouping: Great Western
- Post-grouping: Great Western Railway

Key dates
- 4 December 1901: Opened
- 14 September 1931: Closed to passengers
- 1 November 1950: Closed to goods
Location

Burrington railway station served the village of Burrington, North Somerset, England, from 1901 to 1950 on the Wrington Vale Light Railway.

== History ==
The station was opened on 4 December 1901 by the Great Western Railway. It closed to passengers on 14 September 1931 and closed to goods on 1 November 1950.

Preceding station	Disused railways	Following station
Langford; Line and station closed	Great Western Railway; Wrington Vale Light Railway	Blagdon; Line and station closed
