= Goods shed =

Railway building designed for storing goods before or after carriage in a train

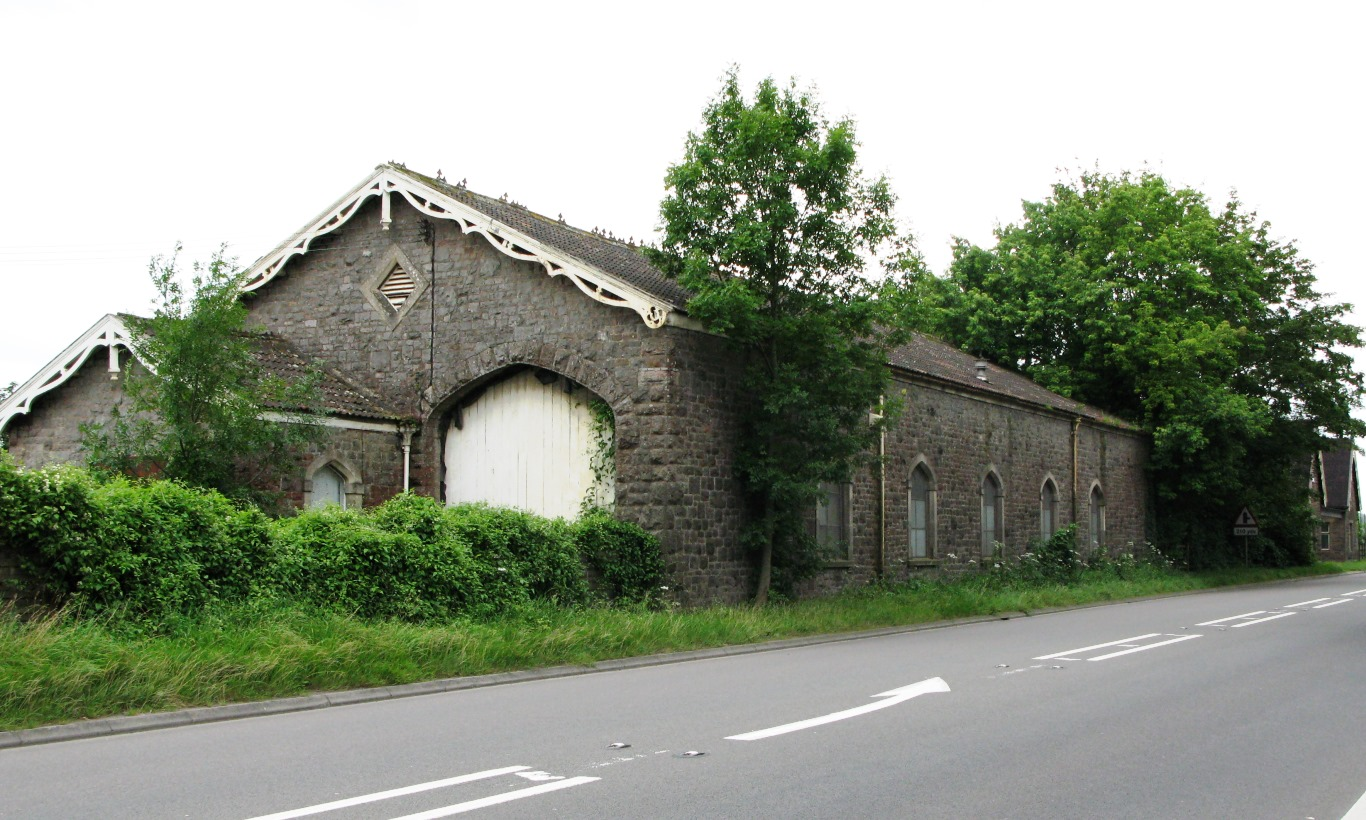
The old goods shed at the former Axbridge railway station. The tracks through the station were where the road can now be seen; the grey doors allowed railway wagons to be taken inside the shed and road vehicles could be brought alongside doors on the opposite side of the building.

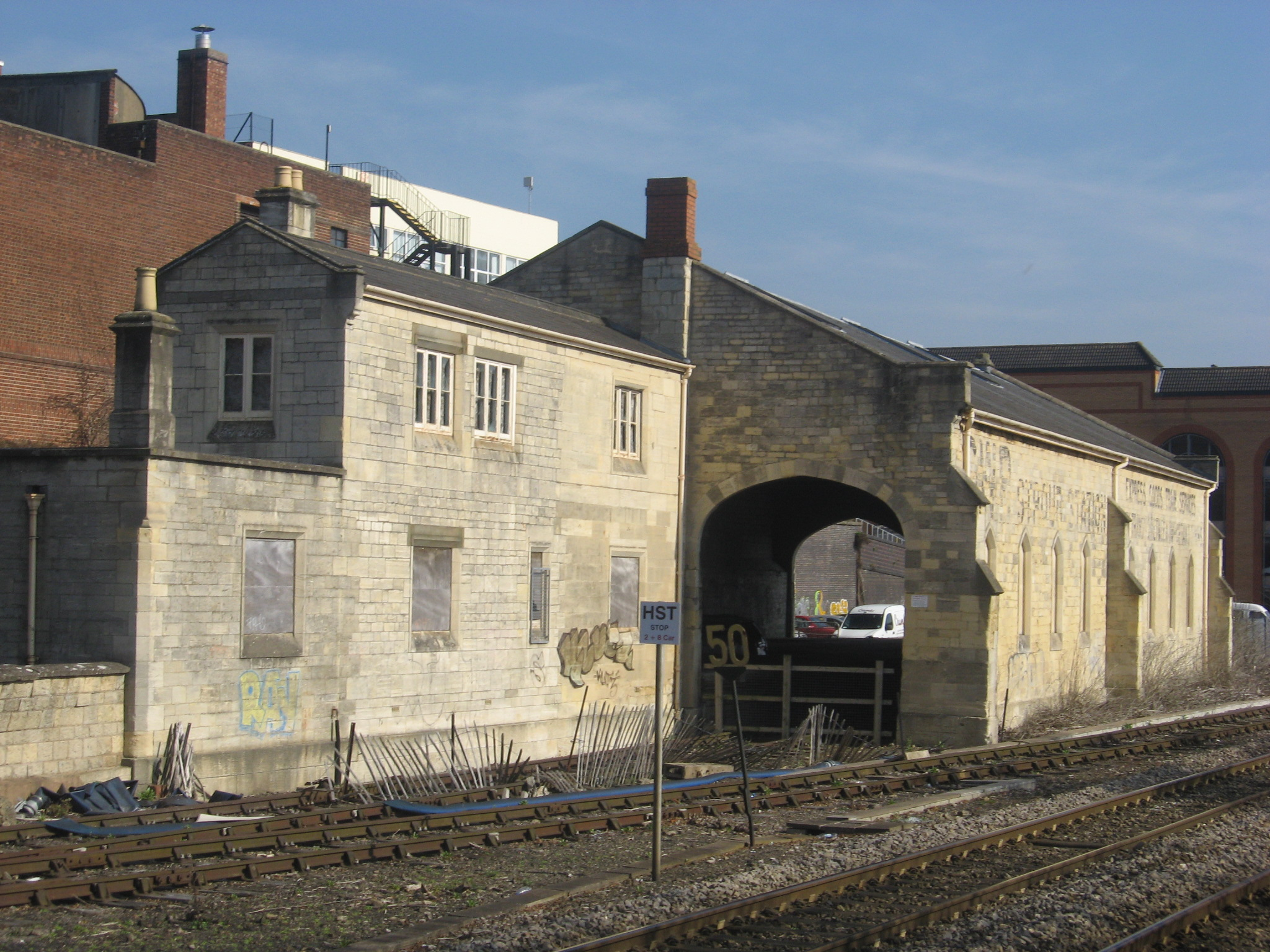
Former goods shed at Stroud, Gloucestershire designed by Isambard Kingdom Brunel

A goods shed is a railway building designed for storing goods before, after, and during loading to and unloading from a train. A typical goods shed will have a track running through it to allow goods wagons to be unloaded under cover, although sometimes they were built alongside a track with possibly just a canopy over the door. There will also be a door to move goods to or from road wagons and vans, this sometimes is parallel to the rail track, or sometimes on the side opposite the rail track. Inside the shed will generally be a platform and sometimes a small crane to allow easier loading and unloading of wagons.

== Double track ==
Some goods sheds had more than one track. If one were not adjacent to the unloading platform then the method of working the second siding would be to first empty the wagons adjacent to the platform, and then open the doors on their far side to access those on the second track. Planks or portable bridges were normally provided for this purpose.

== Conversions ==
When no longer required for goods traffic goods sheds have often been converted for other uses, such as the booking office at Paignton railway station, or as housing. When many rural branch lines in New Zealand were closed, goods sheds along the closed branches often formed integral parts of the depots of road freight companies that replaced the railway.

== Transfer shed ==
Transfer sheds, sometimes called transshipment sheds, were provided to transfer goods between two different railways of different gauges, such as the broad gauge and standard gauge on the Great Western Railway in the United Kingdom. Those at Exeter and Didcot are still intact.

The term can also be applied to a shed on a pier in a harbour where cargo is/was transferred from rail cars or trucks to ships and vice versa. The cargo was temporarily stored in the shed.

== Related terms ==
- Goods station or goods depot - a facility used exclusively for handling goods rather than passengers.
- Goods yard - one or more sidings, generally near a passenger station, where goods wagons can be loaded and unloaded. There may or may not be a goods shed, depending on the nature of the regular traffic handled.
- Goods warehouse - generally used to denote a larger goods shed, often with more than one floor. The larger size was used to store goods for longer periods. Some would be for a specific traffic.
