= Clevedon branch line =

Railway line in England

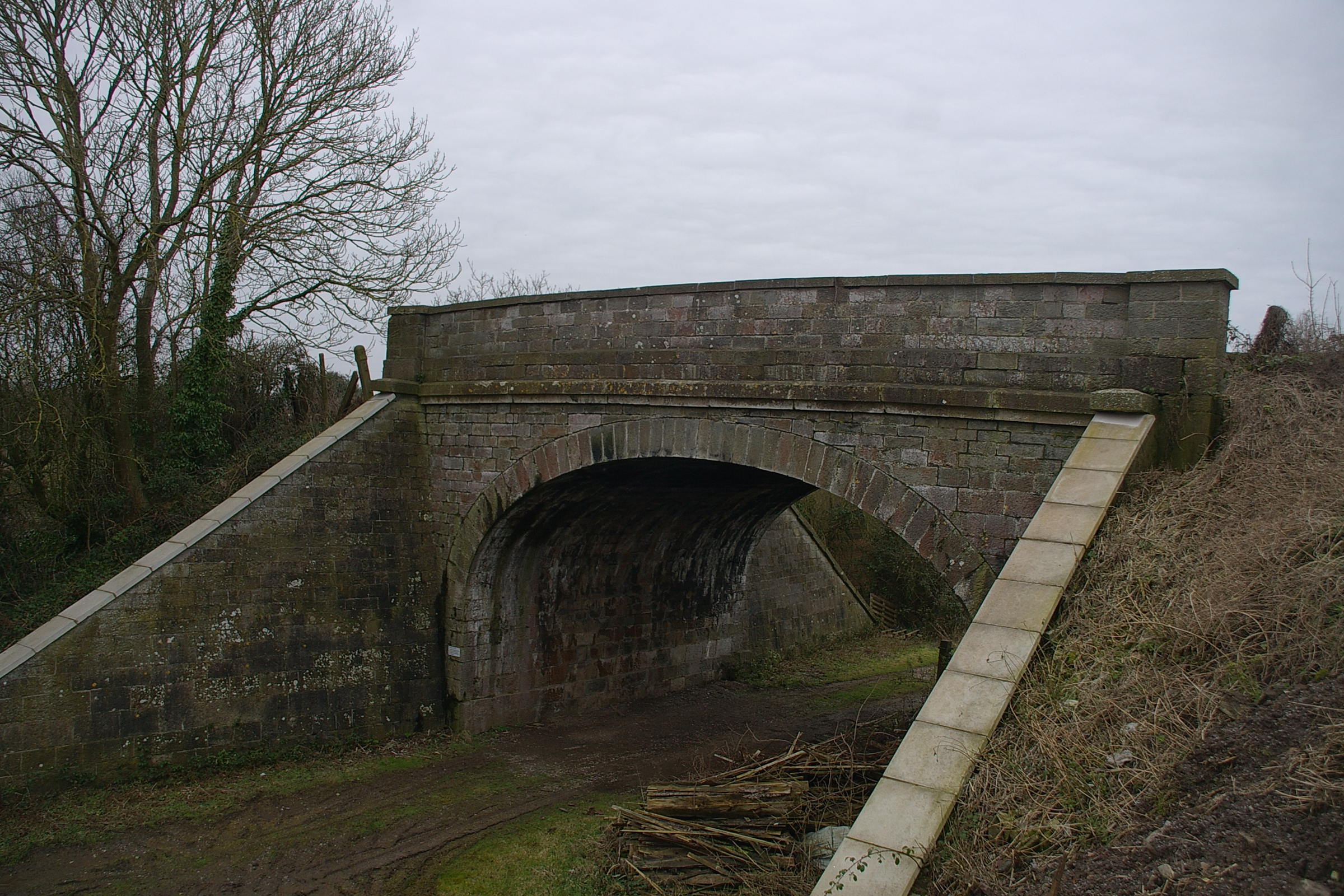
The bridge where Lampley Road passes over the path of the branch line in Kingston Bridge.

The Clevedon branch line was a 3 1/2-mile (5.6 km) branch railway line that ran from Yatton railway station on the Bristol to Taunton Line to Clevedon in North Somerset, England, with no intermediate stops.

== History ==
Seaside resorts became fashionable during the early years of the reign of Queen Victoria. When the Bristol and Exeter Railway (B&ER) opened its main line (at first to Bridgwater) in 1841, a station was provided at "Clevedon Road", about 4 miles (6 km) distant. In the 1845 the B&ER obtained the necessary powers in the Bristol and Exeter Railway Act 1845 (8 & 9 Vict. c. clv) to open a branch line to the town. The line was opened on 28 July 1847.

Starting from Clevedon Road station, which was renamed Yatton at the same time, it was 3 miles 45 chains (5.73 km) long. Branch trains had a bay platform on the upside with an over-all roof. The line was built to the 7 ft (2,134 mm) broad gauge but converted to the standard 4 ft 8 1/2 in (1,435 mm) gauge over the weekend 27 to 29 September 1879.

== Train services ==
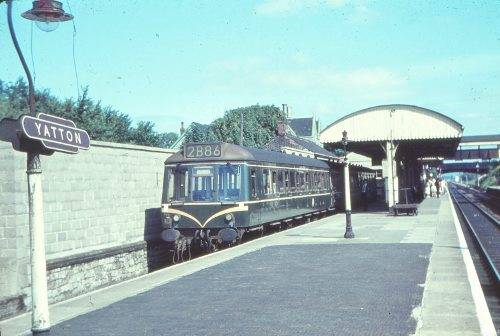
Clevedon branch train, a Class 117, at Yatton in 1962

The branch was mostly operated as a shuttle from Yatton, although there were a few direct trains from Bristol Temple Meads. Between 1924 and 1936 a business service from Bristol at 17:15 consisted of a coach slipped at Yatton, which was then taken to Clevedon on a local train.

Steam railmotors, auto-trains and diesel railcars were used on the line at different times. In its final years, the branch was operated by diesel multiple units or by a single-car diesel railcar. Even in its declining years the service was fairly frequent: the British Railways, Western Region timetable for 1964–1965 shows 24 trains in each direction, with a few more on Saturdays and during the summer, though no Sunday service.

== Clevedon station ==
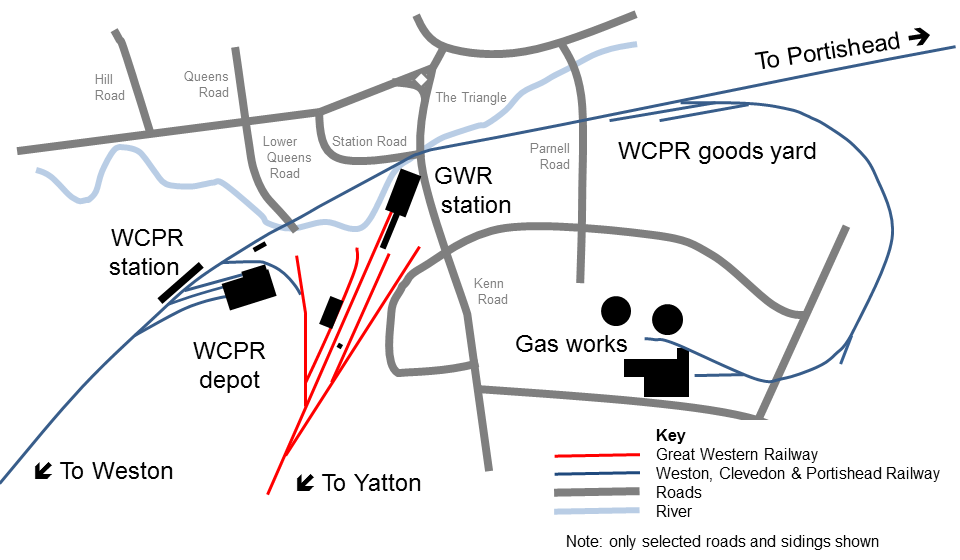
Clevedon stations map, with Clevedon branch shown in red and Weston, Clevedon and Portishead Light Railway which closed in 1940 in blue

Clevedon station was situated at what is now the Queen's Square shopping and restaurant precinct, built in the 1980s. A set of points are preserved and mounted upright as a reminder of the square's history.

Opened in 1847 it was originally a wooden structure but the single platform terminus was rebuilt in 1890. Clevedon had a signal box until the end of 1916, but from 1 January 1917 the branch was operated "under one engine in steam" arrangements. A ground frame was provided to operate the points in the goods yard at Clevedon which was locked or released by key on the train staff.

== Closure ==
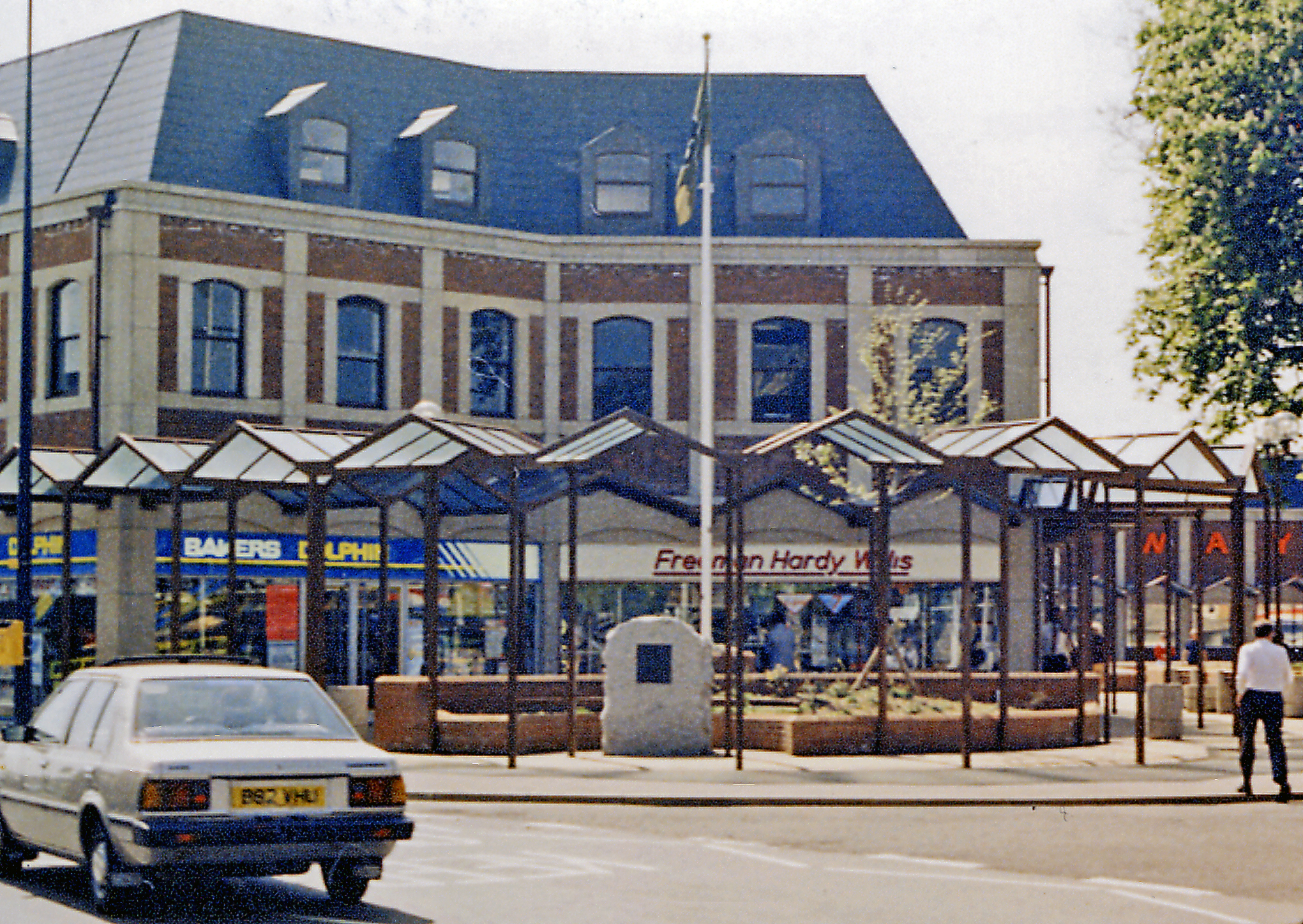
Site of Clevedon station in 1987

Traffic declined as road usage increased in the years following the Second World War. On 10 June 1963 the goods service was discontinued and the goods sidings and ground frame abolished. The station became unstaffed from 20 April 1964, and closed to passengers on 3 October 1966. The line was occasionally used by engineers until about 1970 when the track was lifted.

All the track bed in Clevedon has long since been built on as the town has expanded. The last original bits of track, around Kingston Seymour, were lifted in the late 1980s. Housing developments in the 1990s are built on some of the track bed in Yatton.

== See also ==
- Weston, Clevedon & Portishead Light Railway
- Line on a 1949 OS map
