= Wrington Vale Light Railway =

Railway line in Somerset, England

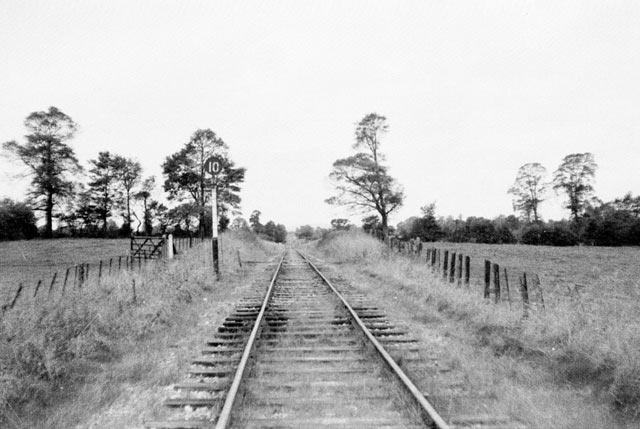
The railway in 1962

The Wrington Vale Light Railway was a railway from Congresbury on the Cheddar Valley line to Blagdon, and serving villages in the Yeo Valley located in North Somerset, England. Construction of the line started in 1897 and it opened in 1901. Never more than a purely local line, it closed to passengers in 1931, and completely in 1963.

== History ==
=== Construction ===
The first attempt to build a railway line in this part of North Somerset took place when the Radstock Wrington and Congresbury Junction Railway Act 1882 (45 & 46 Vict. c. cclxv) was obtained (on 18 August) incorporating the Radstock, Wrington and Congresbury Junction Railway, which was to run from Farrington Gurney on the Bristol and North Somerset Railway to Congresbury through Wrington. However sufficient capital could not be raised, and the company was dissolved by the Radstock, Wrington and Congresbury Junction Railway (Abandonment) Act 1886 (49 & 50 Vict. c. xxix).

The Light Railways Act 1896 (59 & 60 Vict. c. 48) was passed to enable low-cost local railways to be built, and a line from Blagdon to Congresbury was promoted. At this time the Bristol Waterworks Company were building a reservoir at Blagdon, (Note: Parliamentary approval had been obtained in 1888 and work started in 1891; the reservoir started to fill in 1899 and was ready in 1903. Four compound beam engines were responsible for the pumping until April 1949 when they were replaced with electric pumps. Source= Maggs.) and they supported the scheme. The Great Western Railway (GWR) agreed to finance the scheme and manage the actual construction.

In 1896, an application was made for a light railway order; there was to be a short branch to Blagdon Waterworks. A statutory enquiry was held on 20 May 1897.

A public inquiry was held on 20 May 1897; the line was supported by the Bristol Waterworks Company. The Wrington Vale Light Railway Order 1897 was confirmed on 18 March 1898, and the Great Western Railway was authorised to finance, construct and work the line.

Lt. Col. Yorke inspected the line on 28 November 1901, and as he found it satisfactory, the line opened to traffic on 4 December 1901. It was 6 miles 41 chains (10.5 km) long and there were stations at Wrington, Langford, Burrington and Blagdon.

Gradients were severe: leaving Blagdon the line fell at 1 in 75 and then rose at the same gradient, followed by a further downward gradient of 1 in 75. There was then a local summit at Burrington, falling from Langford at 1 in 50. From Wrington to Congresbury the line was broadly level, although with short sections rising at 1 in 70 and falling at 1 in 60. At Blagdon there was a spur siding diverging to the right on the approach, serving the Yeo Pumping Station.

=== Traffic ===
The railway's primary purpose was to bring construction materials for the building of the Blagdon Lake reservoir. Construction of the line overran cost and time forecasts. It was constructed and owned by the Great Western Railway. The GWR used it to trial various innovations to reduce the cost of lightly used passenger services, such as the push-pull system where driving controls are provided in a trailer coach, enabling the locomotive to propel its train backwards without turning around at the end of a run and reducing time. The motor trolley maintenance system was also adopted. The experimental GWR 101 Class oil-fired locomotive of 1901 was also designed for this line, but issues with the design prevented it from entering service. Milk traffic was a considerable source of business on the line.

Passenger trains initially ran from Yatton, the junction for the main line between Bristol and Exeter, and traversed 1.8 mi (2.9 km) of the Cheddar Valley Line that had opened in 1869. The junction for the light railway was at Congresbury, where a second platform and much extended track and signalling were provided.

When the line first opened in 1901, there were four trips a day each way between Blagdon and Yatton; one trip each way was a mixed passenger and goods service. The first train out of Blagdon in the morning went only as far as Congresbury, and returned to Blagdon from there. Other trains ran through from or to Yatton. In 1910, there were five trains a day in each direction on weekdays only. Until 1915, there was a late trip on Saturdays from Blagdon to Yatton and return.

With light traffic, the service was reduced to three trains a day each way in 1919, but the fourth trip was re-instated in 1921. Railmotors were considered at this time in an effort to match operating costs to income, but the gradients on the line prevented them from operating successfully so they were not used. In 1926, the service was increased again to five trips a day in response to competition from the Bristol Tramways and Carriage Company's buses. However this was not successful, and the service returned to the original four trips a day in 1927, until closure to passenger traffic from 14 September 1931.

The 1926 United Kingdom general strike harmed services on the line. Nestlé were managing milk trains from the area at the time, and arranged road lorry collections for the milk traffic. When the strike ended, much of this business stayed on road.

Freight service continued on the line until 1 November 1950, when the section between Wrington and Blagdon was closed fully. Coal traffic continued to Wrington until 6 June 1963, and the line closed completely on the 10th of that month; Congresbury itself retained passenger services until later that year, when it closed with the rest of the Yatton to Witham line.

== Since closure ==
After trains were withdrawn the track was lifted and station buildings either demolished or left unoccupied. The only buildings on the line to have survived until the present day are at Blagdon station, which is now part of a private residence, and the stationmaster's house at Burrington, although it has been much extended.

The Strawberry Line Association and Sustrans have aspirations for a cycle route on the trackbed. North Somerset council has marked the former railway as a future key cycle route in the local plan. The cycle route would connect with the Strawberry Line railway walk at Congresbury and a future route to Clevedon at Yatton station. Much of the planned route between Blagdon and Wrington is in private ownership which presents an obstacle for the route as, apart from the technical issue of who owns which bit of land, there’s a shortage of public money to buy real estate.

== Bristol Airport Rail Link ==
In 2016, the West of England Local Enterprise Partnership produced a report outlining the possibility of using the old trackbed of the railway for the proposed Bristol Airport Rail Link.

== Sources ==
- 1910 Bradshaw's Railway Guide
- Somerset Railway Stations by Mike Oakley, Dovecote Press, 2002
