= Yatton railway station =

Railway station near Bristol, England

Yatton
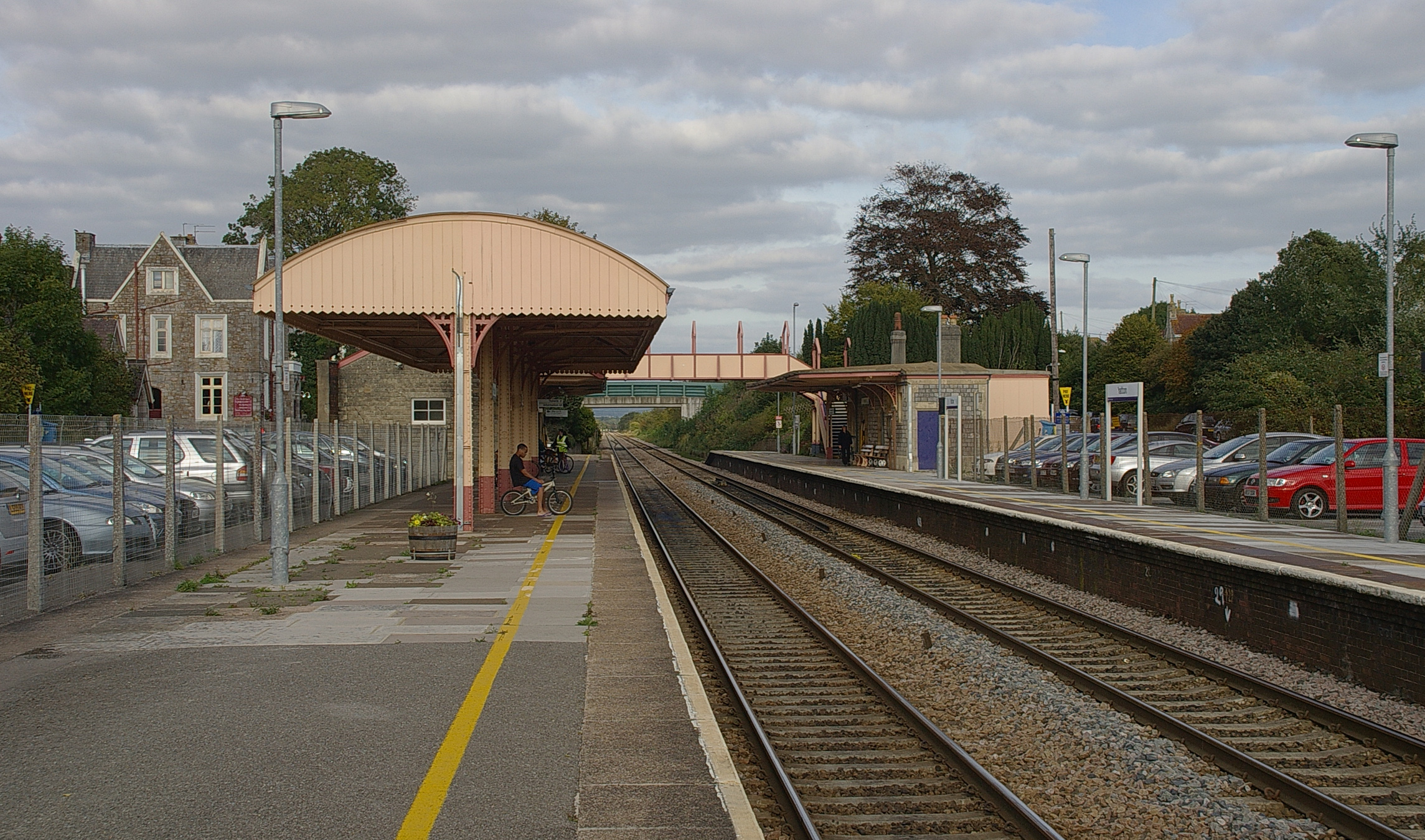

General information
- Location: Yatton, North Somerset; England
- Coordinates: 51.3909°N 2.8278°W
- Grid reference: ST425660
- Manager: Great Western Railway
- Platforms: 2

Other information
- Station code: YAT
- Classification: DfT category E

History
- Original company: Bristol and Exeter Railway
- Pre-grouping: Great Western Railway
- Post-grouping: Great Western Railway

Key dates
- 1841: Station opened as Clevedon Road
- 1847: renamed Yatton coinciding with branch to Clevedon opening
- 1869: Cheddar line opened
- 1963: Cheddar line closed
- 1966: Clevedon line closed

Passengers
- 2021/22: ▲0.333 million
- 2022/23: ▲0.453 million
- 2023/24: ▲0.474 million
- 2024/25: ▲0.527 million
- 2025/26: ▲0.571 million
Location
Notes
- Passenger statistics from the Office of Rail and Road

Designations

Listed Building – Grade II
- Official name: Yatton Station Buildings and Footbridge
- Type: Listed Building
- Designated: January 20, 1986
- Reference no.: 1129160

Yatton railway station, on the Bristol to Exeter line, is in the village of Yatton in North Somerset, England. It is 12 miles (19 km) west of Bristol Temple Meads railway station, and 130 miles (209 km) from London Paddington. Its three-letter station code is YAT. It was opened in 1841 by the Bristol and Exeter Railway, and served as a junction station for trains to Clevedon and Cheddar, but these lines closed in the 1960s. The station, which has two platforms, is managed by Great Western Railway, which provides all train services at the station, mainly hourly services between Bristol Parkway and Weston-super-Mare, and between Cardiff Central and Taunton.

== History ==
The first section of the Bristol and Exeter Railway's (B&ER) main line opened on 14 June 1841 between Bristol and Bridgwater. "Clevedon Road" (as it was then known) was for a while the second station on the line west of Bristol, the first being Nailsea. (Note: Flax Bourton was constructed in 1860 between Bristol and Nailsea, however there was an earlier station at Long Ashton, opened either with the line in 1841, or later in 1852. There is general agreement among such sources that the station, called "Ashton", closed in 1856; however other sources e.g. Oakley (2002) do not mention this station at all.) The line, engineered by Isambard Kingdom Brunel, was built as 7 ft (2,134 mm) broad-gauge. The platform buildings at Yatton are of Brunel style, and it is widely believed Brunel himself designed the buildings. There were significant goods facilities, with a large goods yard and shed to the south of the station. A hotel was provided adjacent to the eastbound platform for people travelling to Clevedon. The station buildings themselves included a ticket office and station master's office on the eastbound platform. A bookstall was in operation from 1888. Services were initially operated by the Great Western Railway (GWR) on behalf of the Bristol & Exeter.

=== Junction station ===
The station was originally built, as the original name suggests, to serve passengers for Clevedon, who would travel on by road. On 28 July 1847, the B&ER opened a branch line between Yatton and Clevedon, and so renamed Clevedon Road station as Yatton. A bay platform was built on the north side of the station to accommodate branch traffic, with an unusual canopy which covered the entire bay, as well as the eastbound platform. The canopy included louvre ventilation. There was also a connection from the main line, albeit at a 10 miles per hour (16 km/h) speed limit, for the few direct trains from Bristol. This too was built to broad gauge. There were five services each weekday, and two on Sundays. These services were also operated by the Great Western Railway, until 1849 when the Bristol & Exeter took over its own workings. By 1869 the number of weekday services had increased to nine. From 1867, Yatton was also served by coal trains for the local gasworks.

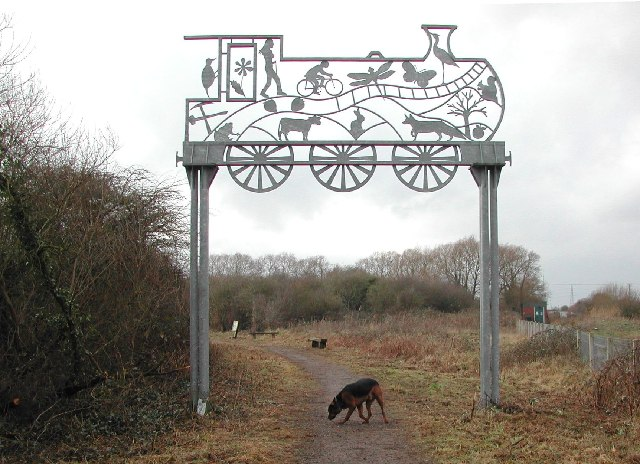
The former Cheddar Valley Railway is now a footpath starting at Yatton station.

Yatton became even more important on 3 August 1869 when the Bristol & Exeter opened the broad-gauge Cheddar Valley Railway, which became famous for the transport of strawberries from stations such as Axbridge and Cheddar. The line was extended to Wells on 5 April 1870, where it joined with the East Somerset Railway line from Witham, and through services from Yatton to Witham became normal for this line, with between five and seven services daily. To accommodate this new traffic, another bay platform was built, this time on the south side of the station. A canopy similar to the one for Clevedon trains was built for this bay, and for passengers at the end of the westbound platform.

On 1 January 1876, the Bristol & Exeter was amalgamated into the GWR, who took over the running of the station and services. In 1879, the Clevedon branch was converted to 4 ft 8 1/2 in (1,435 mm) standard gauge. This followed a scheme throughout the GWR to convert its tracks from broad gauge to mixed gauge. The last GWR broad-gauge train operated on 20 May 1892, after which all tracks were converted to standard gauge. The conversion of the Clevedon line coincided with the opening of an engine shed for branch traffic. A turntable for Cheddar Valley trains was built at around the same time. In 1889, there were 12 weekday trains along the Clevedon branch, and three on Sundays.

=== Heyday and decline ===
By around 1900, there were between five and seven services operating daily along the Cheddar Valley Line, with a mixed mail train on Sundays. Traffic was to increase from 1901 with the opening of the Wrington Vale Light Railway. Although this line joined the Cheddar Valley Line at Congresbury, most services continued to Yatton. In 1901 there were four passenger trains per day and one goods train, which increased to five passenger trains per day by 1903. The line was known for the transport of mushrooms.

By 1910, there were 18 daily services along the Clevedon branch, four on Sundays. A GWR pagoda hut was built in the 1910s at the east end of the eastbound platform, but this was removed some ten years later. By the 1920s Yatton had 40 staff employed, including a boy selling chocolate and cigarettes, and issued almost 60,000 tickets. Traffic on the Clevedon branch was still climbing, now up to 21 services on weekdays and five on Sundays. However, despite this success, there were some problems. Better road transport was reducing traffic along the Wrington line, and the main line was stretched to capacity. To combat this latter problem, goods loops were laid either side of the station – east for 1.25 miles to Claverham from 6 April 1925 and west for 1.75 miles to Huish level crossing on 26 May 1925. The station itself however remained a two-track pinch point.

The Wrington Vale line closed in 1931, with traffic having dropped to only two trains per day with no Sunday service. In 1938 coal traffic to the gas works ended, though there was some through coal traffic along the Clevedon branch. The Cheddar line was not faring well either: the number of tickets sold along the line had decreased dramatically since the early 1900s, although there was still a significant flow of strawberries, milk and cheese to London. The railways were nationalised in 1948, with the GWR becoming the Western Region of British Railways, but this did not halt the decline. The line was closed to passengers in 1963, with the only traffic to serve a private siding near Cheddar, but this too closed in 1969.

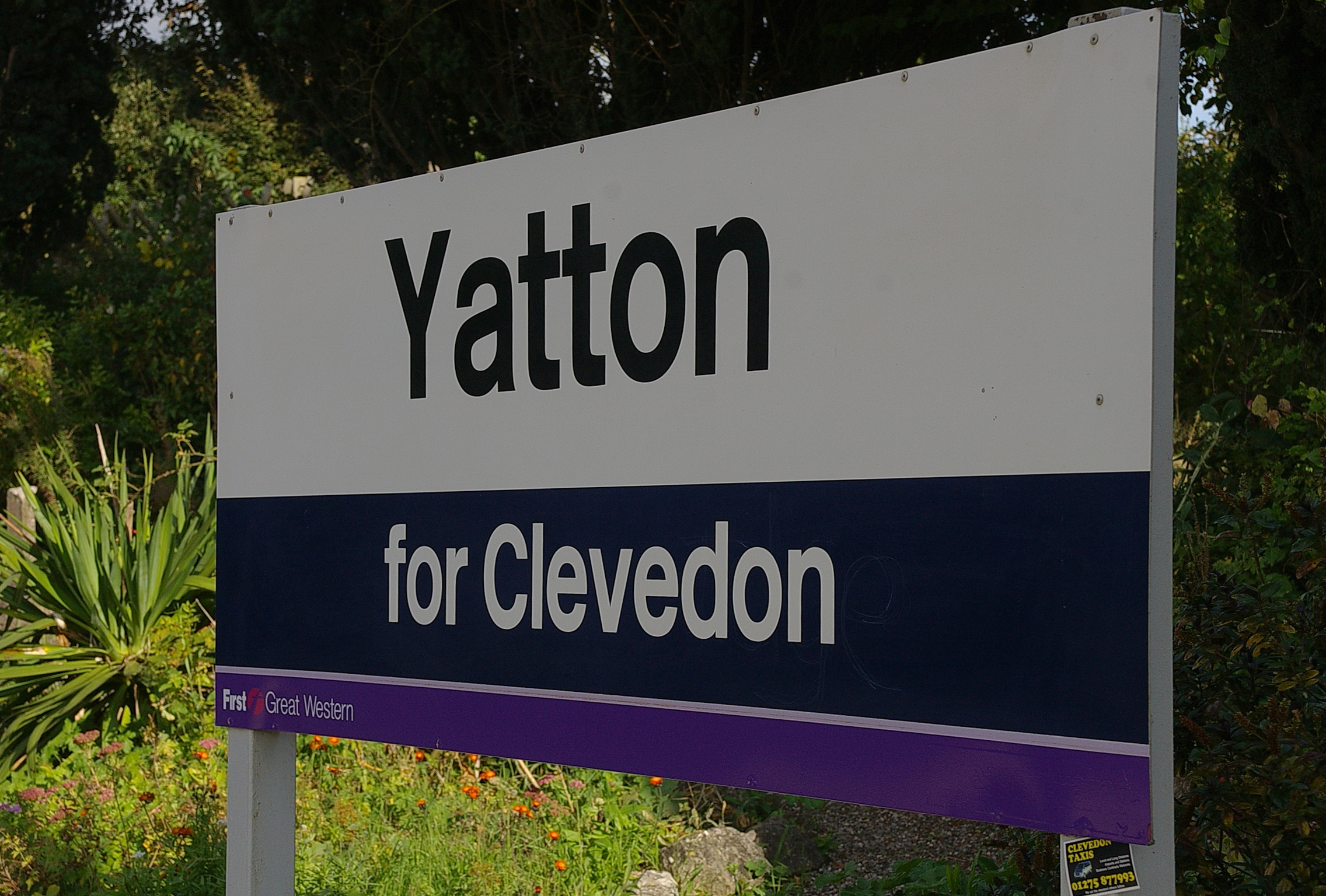
Station name boards note Yatton is "for Clevedon". Following the closure of the Clevedon Branch Line in 1966, Yatton is the closest station to Clevedon.

The Clevedon branch was seeing increased passenger traffic, up to 26 trains daily and 10 on Sundays by 1958, and in 1956 the unusual canopy was taken down, replaced by a second-hand canopy from Dauntsey railway station. However, this uptick was not to last: coal traffic along the line ended in 1951, and by 1963 there were no longer any freight workings. The line closed completely on 3 October 1966, taking the station's bookstall with it. The Claverham loops had been closed on 6 September 1964, and the goods yard at Yatton was closed on 29 November 1965. The now-redundant bay platforms were converted into car parks, and the canopy on the westbound platform removed along with the two water towers. On 24 January 1972, the passing loops to the west of the station were cut back to 0.5 miles (0.80 km), and the station's signal box, which had had 129 levers, closed on 31 January the same year.

| Preceding station | Historical railways | Following station |
|---|---|---|
| Nailsea and Backwell | Bristol–Exeter line (1841–1964) | Puxton and Worle |
| | Disused railways | |
| Terminus | Clevedon branch line (1847–1966) | Clevedon |
| Congresbury | Cheddar Valley line (1869–1963) | Terminus |

=== Modern times ===
British Rail was split into business-led sectors in the 1980s, at which time operations at Yatton passed to Regional Railways. In the 1990s, a stop was added at Yatton for a Royal Mail train to provide a more direct link to Bristol Airport. The service was ended in 2004 when the post office stopped transporting mail by train. When the railways were privatised in 1997, local services at Yatton were franchised to Wales & West, which was in turn succeeded by Wessex Trains, an arm of National Express, in 2001. The Wessex franchise was amalgamated with the Great Western franchise into the Greater Western franchise from 2006, and responsibility passed to First Great Western, which was rebranded as Great Western Railway in 2015.

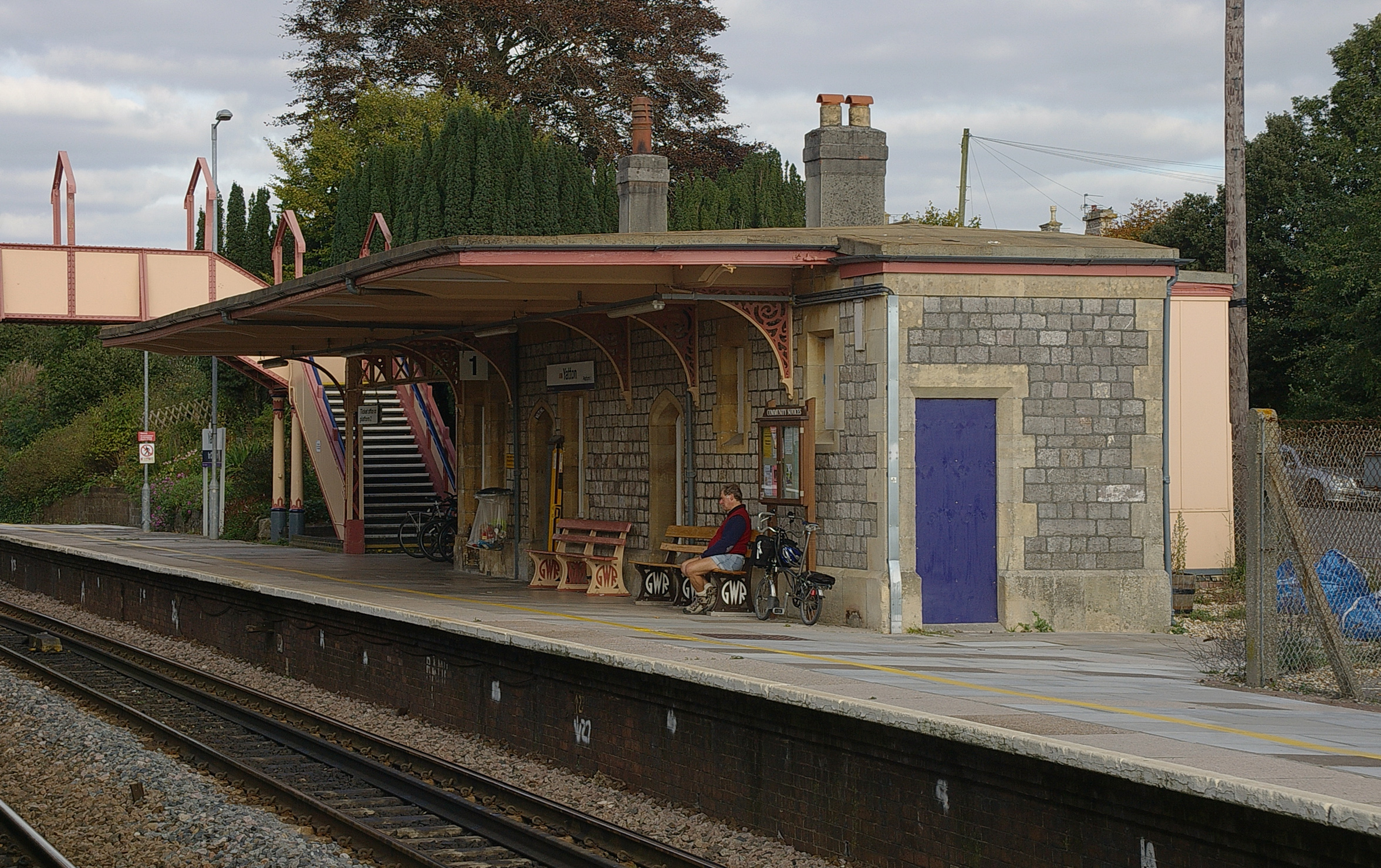
The building on the westbound platform has been converted into a café.

There was somewhat of a revival of fortunes for the Cheddar Valley Line, which has been converted into a foot and cycle path. A 6-metre-high (20 ft) metal arch was erected in 2000 to mark the start of walk. The station buildings on the westbound platform have now been converted into the Strawberry Line Café, which opened in 2011, providing employment and training for people with learning disabilities, as well as snacks for commuters, walkers and local residents.

In March 2005, Wessex Trains, the company managing the station at the time, introduced car parking charges. It was noted that this resulted in less use of the car parks, more local street parking and caused people to drive to Nailsea and Backwell railway station, where parking was still free. Following local pressure, the charges were reduced in July 2005.

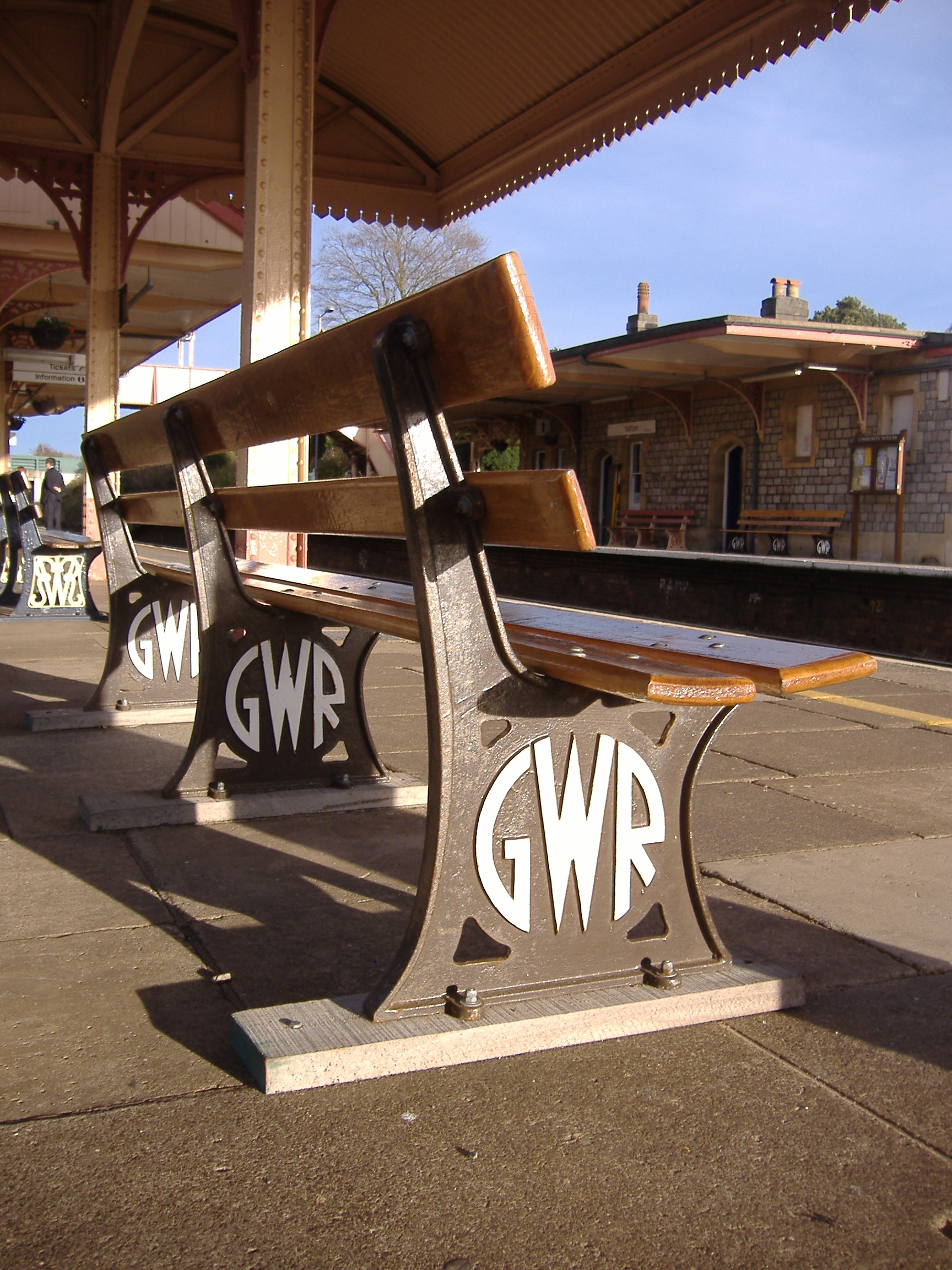
Replica Great Western Railway benches were installed in 2006.

The eastbound platform buildings were refurbished in 2005 to guard against rising damp. A year later, in 2006, replica Great Western Railway benches were provided by the National Trust. Hanging baskets were brought to the station in 2011 as a joint effort between the Severnside Community Rail Partnership, Cleve Nurseries and the station's garden group.

== Description ==
The station is located in the north end of the village of Yatton, North Somerset, just west of the B3133 road between Clevedon and Congresbury. The station is on the Bristol to Exeter line, 130 miles 28 chains (209.78 km) from London Paddington and 11 miles 77 chains (19.25 km) from Bristol Temple Meads. (Note: Railways in the United Kingdom are, for historical reasons, measured in miles and chains. There are 80 chains to the mile.) It is the fourth station along the line from Bristol. The station is oriented along an axis at 57 degrees to the meridian.

There are two platforms, on either side of the two tracks through the station. The southern platform, platform 1, is 162 metres (177 yd) long and serves westbound trains (towards Weston-super-Mare); the northern platform, platform 2, is 121 metres (132 yd) long and serves eastbound trains (towards Bristol). The line through the station has a speed limit of 100 miles per hour (160 km/h). Access to the two platforms is step-free from car parks on each side of the station, accessible via short roads from the B3133. There is an uncovered footbridge between the two platforms, but disabled passengers must go the long way round via the B3133. A ticket office is provided on platform 2, staffed every morning except Sundays. Ticket machines are available, allowing the buying of tickets for on-the-day travel, and collection of pre-bought tickets. There are waiting rooms on both platforms, with toilets on platform 2, but none suitable for wheelchairs. "Next train" dot matrix displays and an automated public-address system announce approaching services.

There is a pay and display car park on each side of the station, with a total of 114 spaces. There are bus stops nearby on the B3133. Cycle storage is available on the access roads.

The station is the start point for the Strawberry Line, a foot and cyclepath built mostly on old railway land to Axbridge. The start of the path is marked by a 6-metre-high (20 ft) arch. The Strawberry Line Café, run by a local community group, is located on platform 1, and is open most days from 8:00 am to serve commuters.

Just beyond the station, to the west, are a pair of relief lines to allow slower trains to be overtaken. There are also some cross-over points, allowing trains to terminate on the westbound relief line and then return eastwards.

== Services ==
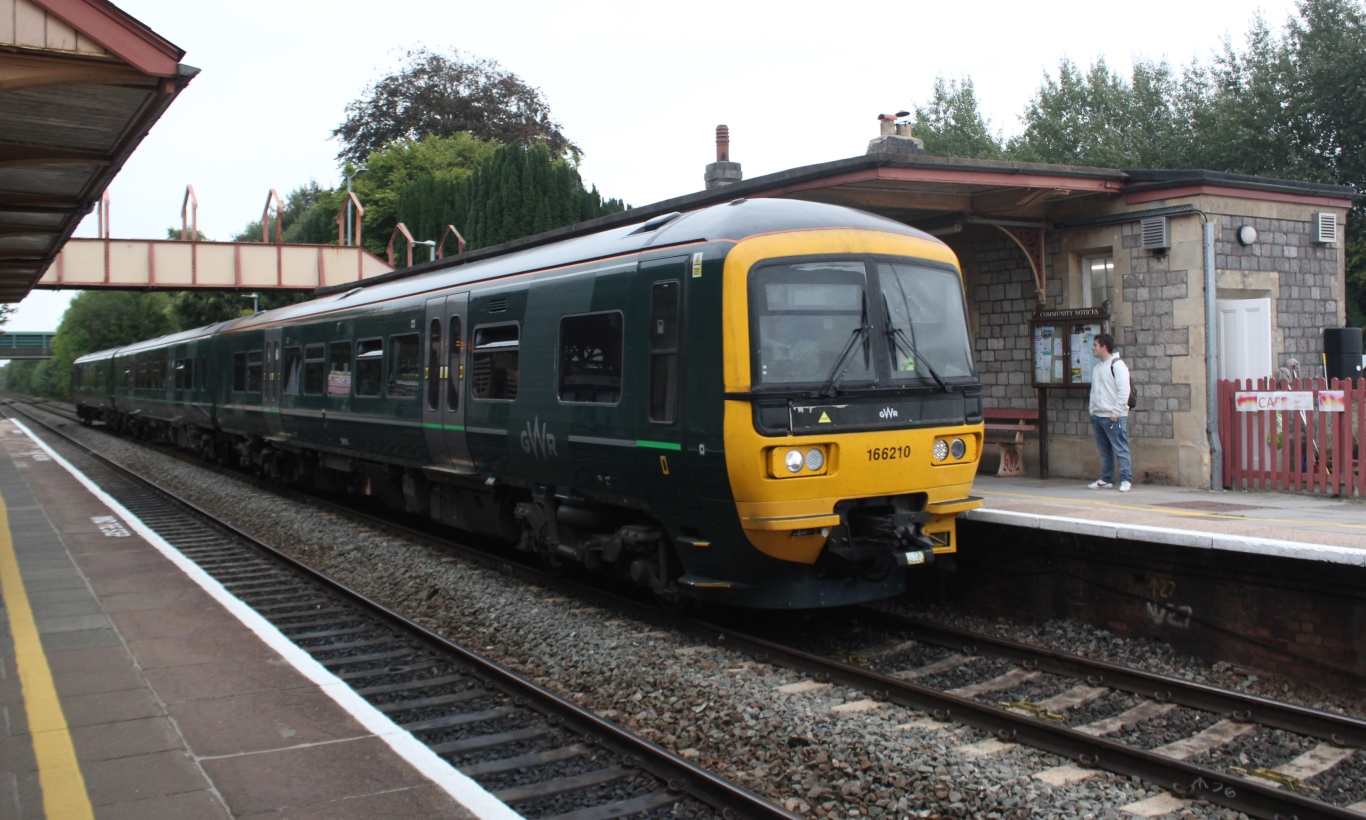
A Class 166 at Yatton with a service towards Weston-super-Mare.

The station is managed by Great Western Railway, who also operate all rail services from the station. The core service consists of two trains in each direction each hour. One is the Severn Beach to Weston-super-Mare service which calls at all stations, the other is the faster Cardiff Central to Taunton service, most of which are extended to Exeter St Davids or Penzance. There are also services between London Paddington and Weston-super-Mare which call at Yatton approximately every two hours. The typical journey time to Bristol Temple Meads is around 15 to 20 minutes and around 2 hours to London.

One morning northbound CrossCountry service used to stop at Yatton in the morning peak during 2008, but this operation has ceased. CrossCountry services still pass through the station, but do not stop.

| Preceding station | National Rail | Following station |
|---|---|---|
| Nailsea & Backwell | Great Western Railway (Severn Beach–Weston-super-Mare) | Worle |
| Nailsea & Backwell | Great Western Railway (Cardiff Central–Penzance) | Worle |
| Nailsea & Backwell | Great Western Railway (London Paddington–Weston-super-Mare) | Worle |

== Incidents ==
On 7 May 1842, a steam locomotive ran away from its train without a driver whilst briefly decoupled at Yatton. The locomotive eventually came to a stop when it ran out of fuel approaching Bridgwater.

== Future ==
Yatton is on the Weston-super-Mare/Yate corridor, one of the main axes of the Greater Bristol Metro, a rail transport plan which aims to enhance transport capacity in the Bristol area. The group Friends of Suburban Bristol Railways supports the electrification of the line through Nailsea & Backwell, as does MP for Weston-super-Mare John Penrose.

Yatton Parish Council has stated that adding a roof to the station footbridge is one of their priorities.
