= Cheddar Valley line =

Railway line in England

Overview
- Owner: British Rail

History
- Opened: 1858
- Closed: 1963

Technical
- Track gauge: 1,435 mm (4 ft 8 1/2 in)
- Old gauge: 7 ft 1/4 in (2,140 mm)

The Cheddar Valley line was a railway line in Somerset, England, running between Yatton and Witham. It was opened in parts: the first section connecting Shepton Mallet to Witham, later extended to Wells, was built by the East Somerset Railway from 1858. Later the Bristol and Exeter Railway built their branch line from Yatton to Wells, but the two lines were prevented for a time from joining up. Eventually the gap was closed, and the line became a simple through line, operated by the Great Western Railway.

The line became known as the 'Strawberry Line' because of the volume of locally grown strawberries that it carried. It closed in 1963. Sections of the former trackbed have been opened as the Strawberry Line railway walk, which runs from Yatton to Cheddar. The southern section operates as a heritage railway using the name East Somerset Railway.

== History ==
=== Main line railways ===
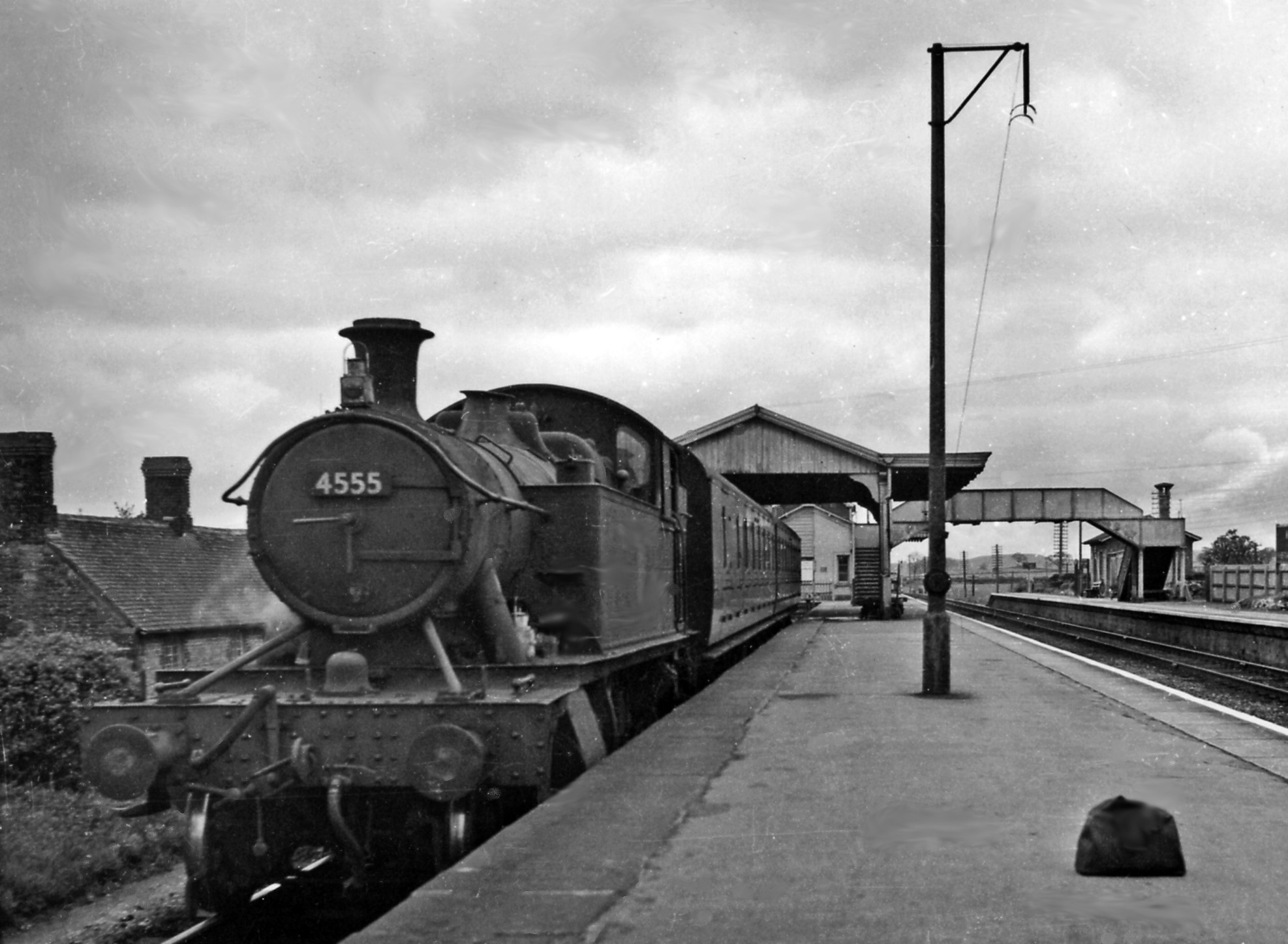
Cheddar Valley line train in the bay platform at Witham

Important inland market towns suddenly found themselves at a huge disadvantage when trunk railways connected competing communities, giving them cheap and fast transport of the necessities of life, and of their products. When the Great Western Railway (GWR) opened throughout between London and Bristol in 1841, the inhabitants of Wells and Shepton Mallet saw that a railway connection was important for them.

The Wilts, Somerset and Weymouth Railway (WS&WR) obtained its authorising act of Parliament, the Wilts, Somerset and Weymouth Railway Act 1845 (8 & 9 Vict. c. liii), on 30 June 1845, to build from the GWR main line near Chippenham, to Salisbury and to Weymouth, the latter part running through Frome, Witham and Castle Cary towards Yeovil. The WS&WR was soon taken over by the GWR; construction enabled the line as far as Frome to be opened on 7 October 1850, but the line towards Weymouth had a low priority, and the section between Frome and Yeovil did not open until 1 September 1856.

=== East Somerset Railway ===
Inhabitants of Shepton Mallet saw that a branch line to the WS&WR (now GWR) line was feasible, and a provisional East Somerset Railway Company was formed at a meeting on 29 September 1855. The line was to join the GWR at Frome. The GWR was supportive, but made it clear that the promoters would not receive financial help from them. Isambard Kingdom Brunel was retained as the little company's engineer, and after a survey he recommended that Witham would be a preferable point of junction, reducing construction costs. A contractor, Rowland Brotherhood of Chippenham, agreed to subscribe £25,000 to the company's share issue if it could raise £30,000. On 5 June 1856 the East Somerset Railway Act 1856 (19 & 20 Vict. c. xvi) was passed, authorising share capital of £75,000. The City of Wells had anticipated a rail connection from the Somerset Central Railway, which had opened from Glastonbury to Highbridge in 1854; the Somerset Central main line was to have passed through the city, but the railway's priorities had changed and even a branch connection was much delayed. Accordingly, interested parties in Wells approached the provisional directors of the East Somerset line; if Wells subscribed £12,500, would the ESR connect to their city? They would, and nearly all of the promised subscription was quickly forthcoming; the ESR obtained the East Somerset Railway (Extension to Wells) Act 1857 (20 & 21 Vict. c. cv) on 27 July 1857 extending their powers to reach Wells, and authorising an additional £40,000 capital. The connection to Wells opened in 1862.

Contract had been let to Brotherhood for the construction of the Shepton Mallet section early in 1857 and in October 1858 Captain Yolland of the Board of Trade visited the line for the formal inspection prior to opening for passengers. There were a number of detail issues: a turntable was provided at Shepton Mallet but not at Witham; and the signalling arrangements at Witham were questionable. The company undertook that only tank engines would be used, rendering the turntable unnecessary, and Brunel personally managed to persuade the Board of Trade that opening was permissible: they agreed, and the opening took place on 9 November 1858.

The line was single, and on the broad gauge with longitudinal sleepers and bridge rails. The GWR would work the line including maintaining the permanent way.

=== Extending to Wells ===
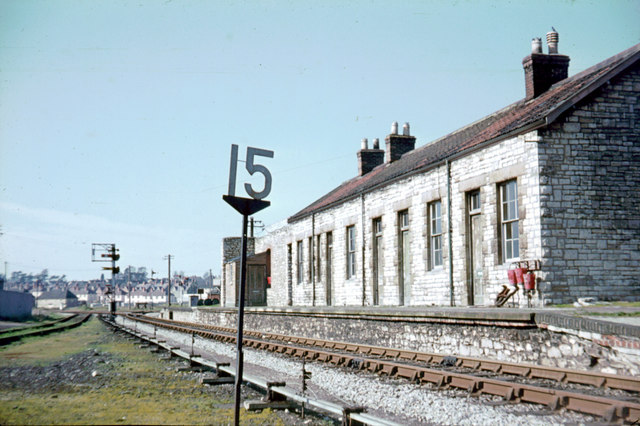
The former Priory Road station at Wells

The Somerset Central Railway opened its line as far as Wells on 15 March 1859, and seeing that the projected ESR extension there would abstract business from them, they proposed to the ESR that the two lines should link at Street, combine and arrange for the whole combined line to be worked by the GWR. The ESR did not favour this arrangement, and decided to proceed with its own extension. However the implacable opposition of a landowner made adherence to the route originally designed impracticable, and a deviation to avoid his residence was planned; this was authorised by another act of Parliament, the East Somerset Railway Act 1860 (23 & 24 Vict. c. lxxiii), of 14 June 1860. It appears that a connection with the Somerset Central Railway at Wells had been included in the original act, but that this was dropped from the 1860 act. Work on the line started in December, the main contractor being D. Baldwin, and the line was ready for Board of Trade inspection in February 1862.

The inspector was again Yolland, now apparently a Lieutenant-Colonel. He observed that there was now a turntable at Shepton Mallet, in the middle of the line, but none at either terminus, and the signalling system was inadequate: he declined to pass the line as ready. The Board of Trade seems to have overruled him on receiving undertakings that one engine at a time would be in use on the line. A ceremonial opening of the line took place on 28 February 1862, and the public opening was next day, 1 March 1862. The electric telegraph was hastily installed in pursuance of an undertaking given to the Board of Trade, and was ready on 1 May 1862.

=== ESR sold to the GWR ===
The East Somerset Railway (ESR) was not a success in financial terms, and after a few years the possibility of a sale to the wealthy Great Western Railway (GWR) was being considered. The East Somerset valued its line at £87,138, but the GWR was unwilling to pay that price for an unsuccessful railway. The GWR was planning to convert the gauge of the former Wilts, Somerset and Weymouth line to standard gauge, and gave notice to the East Somerset in January 1874 that it would do so in May. The ESR directors could hardly have been surprised at this development, but it meant that they too would have to convert the gauge of their line. The cost of that would be £7,390, money that they did not have. The ESR now had no alternative to selling to the GWR, which they did for GWR preference stock valued at £67,442. The sale took effect on 2 December 1874.

=== Somerset Central Railway ===
As described above, the Somerset Central Railway (SCR) had opened its branch line from Glastonbury to Wells on 15 March 1859; the Somerset Central was a broad gauge line at this time, worked by the Bristol and Exeter Railway (B&ER), with which it joined at Highbridge. It was originally contemplated that the line would make a direct connection with the East Somerset line, but this did not take place. The SCR station was aligned towards the ESR station, but they stopped on opposite sides of Priory Road without connecting to one another.

The Somerset Central was taking steps to become independent of the B&ER, mixing the gauge of its track and acquiring its own rolling stock. In August 1862 it merged with the Dorset Central Railway, together forming the Somerset and Dorset Railway (S&DR).

Cheddar Valley and Yatton Railway Act 1864
- Act of Parliament
- Parliament of the United Kingdom
- Long title: An Act for authorizing the making of Railways from the Railway of the Somerset and Dorset Railway Company at Wells to the Railway of the Bristol and Exeter Railway Company at Yatton, and Arrangements between those Companies in relation thereto; and for other Purposes.
- Citation: 27 & 28 Vict. c. clxxxi

Dates
- Royal assent: 14 July 1864

Text of statute as originally enacted

The Somerset Central had intended making a branch from Wells to Yatton, joining the B&ER main line there, and including the formation of the direct connection to the East Somerset line at Wells, and a spur there to enable direct running from Glastonbury to Bristol. The Somerset and Dorset Railway took over the project, obtaining the Cheddar Valley and Yatton Railway Act 1864 (27 & 28 Vict. c. clxxxi) on 14 July 1864 for the Cheddar Valley and Yatton Railway. The B&ER had promoted a competing line, but a settlement was reached in which the B&ER and the S&DR agreed to abandon schemes encroaching on each other's area of influence, and the Cheddar Valley and Yatton scheme was transferred to the B&ER; the transfer of powers was ratified by the Bristol and Exeter Railway (Additional Powers) Act 1865 (28 & 29 Vict. c. xcvii) on 19 June 1865.

=== Cheddar Valley and Yatton Railway ===
The Bristol and Exeter Railway proceeded with the construction of the project it had acquired; their chief engineer, Francis Fox, was resident engineer for the work. The authorised scheme was to run to the East Somerset Railway station at Wells, running through and calling at the Somerset and Dorset station there, and the track was to be on the broad gauge. There was to be a 180-yard (165-metre) tunnel at Shute Shelve.

A difficulty with the route emerged at Wells: the tracks at the approach to the Somerset Central Railway (now S&DR) station had been laid out in a way that cut across the proposed Cheddar Valley line to the East Somerset station. The Board of Trade made it clear that the proposed through line was not acceptable, and the B&ER had to construct a separate station at Wells on Tucker Street, short of the S&DR. There would now be three stations in Wells.

The B&ER line was opened to Cheddar on 3 August 1869: the lavish passenger station was not ready, and for a period the goods shed was used for passenger purposes. The passenger station was open on 9 or 10 May 1870.

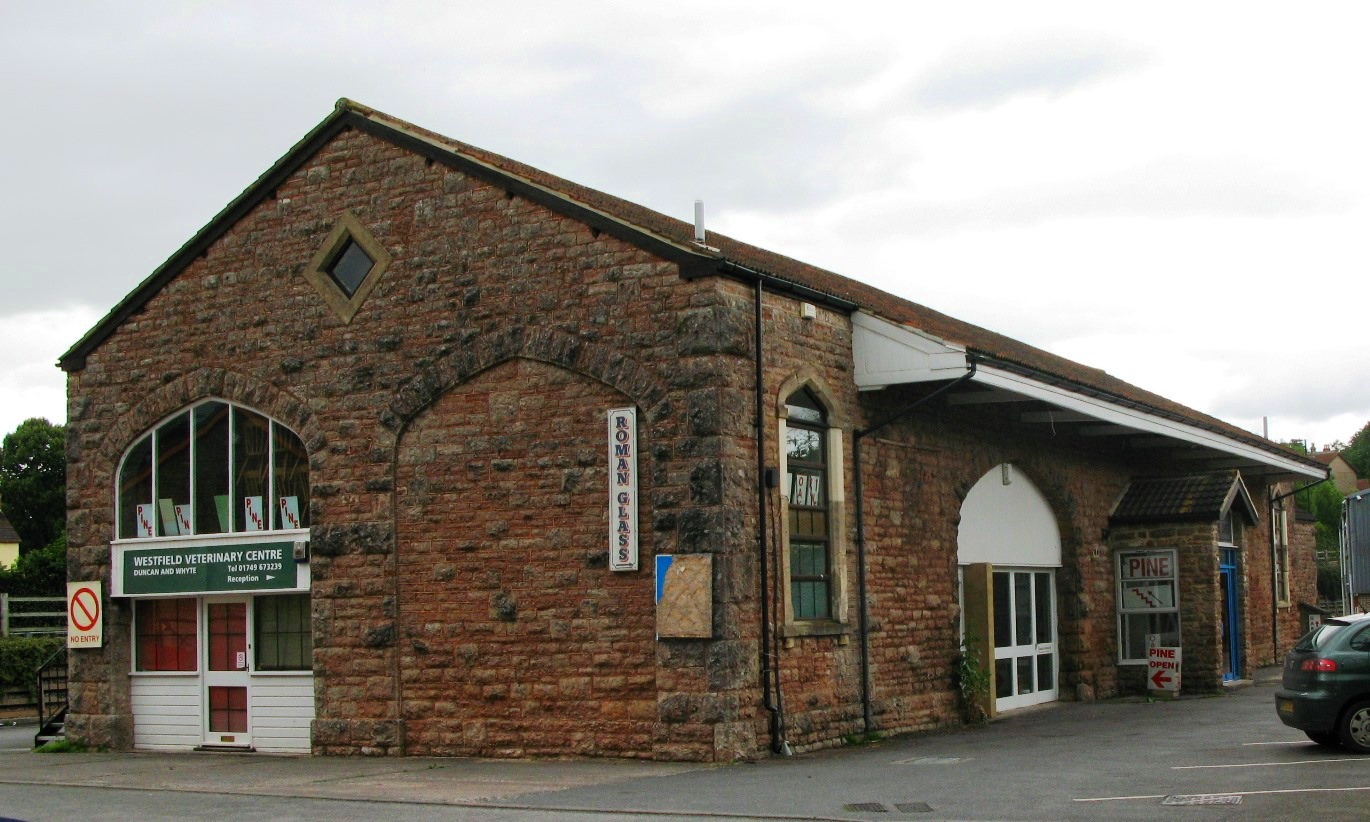
The former Wells Tucker Street goods shed

The line was opened to the Tucker Street station at Wells on 5 April 1870.

=== Connecting through Wells ===
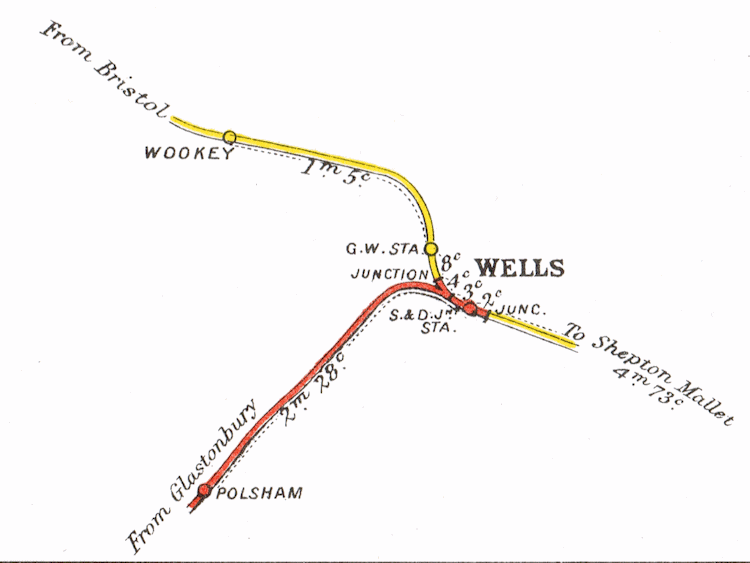
Railway Clearing House diagram showing railways at Wells in 1913

From that date Wells had three stations, none of them connected, yet all aligned with through running in mind: from north-west to south-east, the B&ER station at Tucker Street; the Somerset and Dorset station aligned as a through station, but with its line from Glastonbury approaching from the south-west; and the GWR (former ESR) station. All were called "Wells" at this stage.

This situation persisted for several years; in 1876 the Deputy Chairman of the GWR visited, and reported

Proceeding through the Somerset & Dorset station I had pointed out to me what had already been done to form a physical connection with the B&E lines, so that, by arrangement, vehicles could then pass from one of our stations to the other. Proceeding to the Great Western station ... the first thing which attracted my attention was a new first class coach, sent from Swindon ... [it was] destined to relieve a B&E coach, and it had been sent to the wrong station at Wells, and to reach the right one, it had to do so via Bristol.

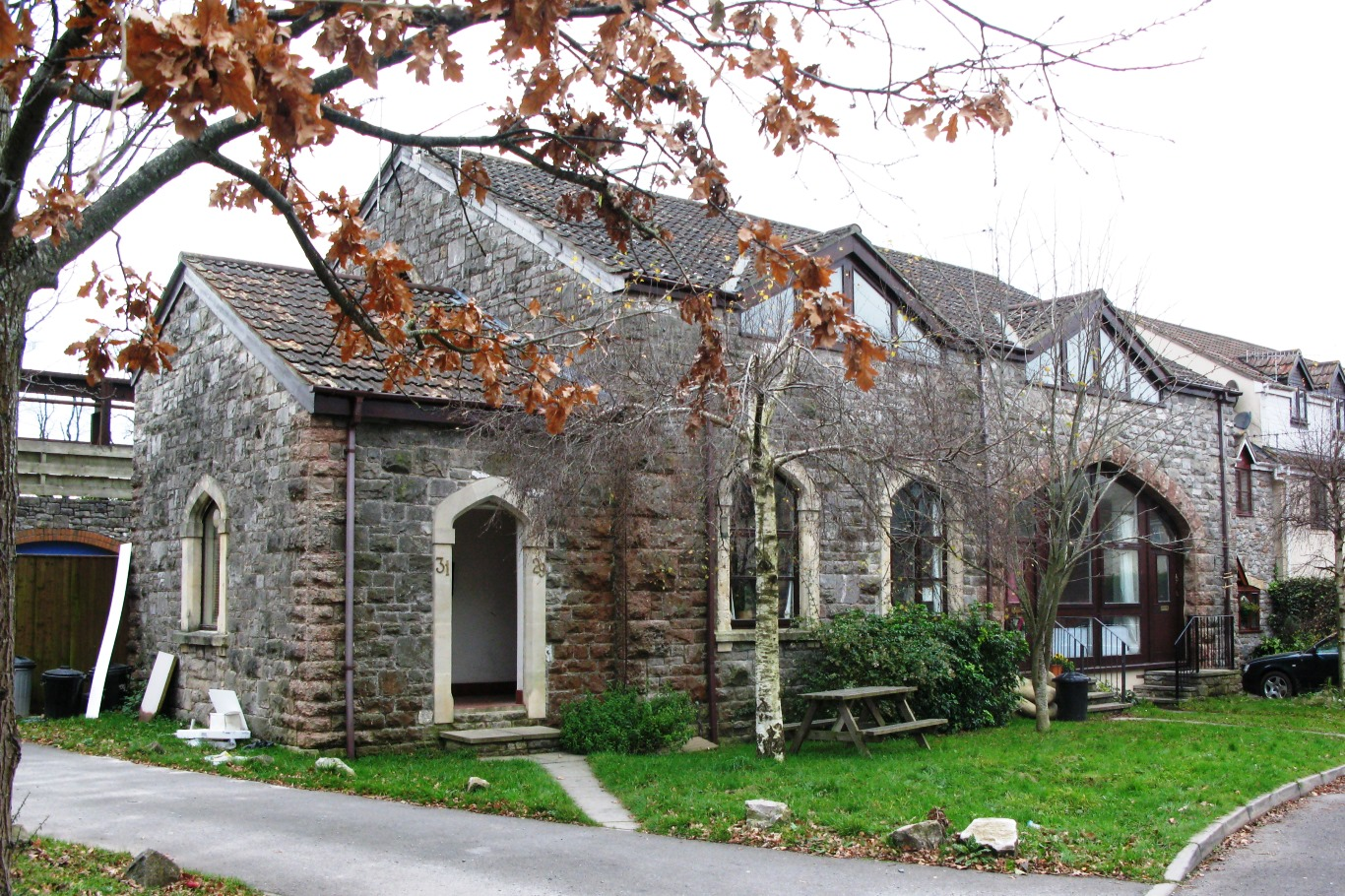
The former Cheddar station goods shed

It appears that from the beginning the desired track had been laid; when Board of Trade sanction to open it was refused, the Somerset and Dorset company nonetheless charged the B&ER for the agreed rental charge. Later the ESR approached the GWR asking them to agree to work goods movements over the line, as the Board of Trade refusal only applied to passenger trains; the GWR replied that it would "hesitate to use the junction [i.e. the connecting line] without the authority of the Board of Trade."

In fact in 1874 when the B&ER Yatton line was still broad but the GWR's former ESR line was narrow, an exchange platform was built by the B&ER at the East Somerset station, but sanction to run passenger trains through was again refused by Colonel Yolland; this was partly due to anticipated blockage of the turnpike road (Priory Road) by ESR engines running round their trains. Yolland reported that

Great pains [had] been taken to make such arrangements of the sidings points and their connections with the signals by interlocking as to provide against the danger inherent on crossing so many goods lines on the level, but ... these arrangements are not suitable for working the passenger trains through Wells, as a through station ... [nor do I] assent to the present construction of this station so far as it renders it necessary to shunt engines across the turnpike road. ... [and] there are still sidings lying south of [the Somerset and Dorset] passenger lines which are not provided with blind sidings or throw-off points to prevent vehicles from being brought out of them without the sanction of the signalman on duty.

Gauge conversion on the B&ER line in November 1875 and operation of through trains of course reduced the blockage of the road by engines of terminating trains running round; the remaining sidings that did not have trap points must have been fitted, for the Board of Trade objection to through running was eventually resolved, and the intended connection was opened on 1 January 1878. Track layout diagrams show a "collecting" siding that traps vehicles in the goods sidings of Wells S&D Yard, protecting the through running line, and there was a signal box immediately overlooking the yard, later designated Wells "A" Box.

The Somerset and Dorset Joint Railway (S&DJR) was already standard gauge by this time, and the other two railways had moved from broad gauge to standard gauge in 1875 (see below). The Bristol and Exeter had amalgamated with the GWR in 1876, and the integrated service ran from Yatton through to Witham, which became the standard service for this line from 1878. GWR trains ran through the Priory Road S&DJR station without stopping. As it was the terminus of that railway's branch from Glastonbury and Street, so that terminating trains blocked the through line during their own station duties there.

=== Gauge conversion ===
By the 1870s it began to be obvious that the indefinite continuation of the broad gauge was impossible, and plans were formulated to convert the broad gauge lines to standard gauge (often referred to as narrow gauge for contrast). In 1874 131 miles (211 km) of the former Wilts, Somerset and Weymouth group of lines were converted; this included the former East Somerset line. In a huge operation, the last broad gauge trains ran on the line on 18 June, and on Sunday 21 June narrow gauge rolling stock was in place ready to operate a normal service.

The Bristol and Exeter Railway converted its branch line from Yatton to Wells from 15 to 18 November 1875.

=== Bristol and Exeter amalgamation ===
The Bristol and Exeter Railway amalgamated with the Great Western Railway on 1 January 1876; the amalgamated company retained the title the Great Western Railway. The entire route from Yatton to Witham was now under single ownership, although it relied on running over 9 chains (180 m) of the Somerset and Dorset Joint Railway.

=== Wrington Vale Light Railway ===
Blagdon and Farrington Gurney had long wanted a railway connection, but local interests could not raise the necessary funds. The Light Railways Act 1896 enabled the construction and operation of railways with lower standards and therefore more cheaply. This coupled with the interest of the Bristol Waterworks Company in building a large reservoir which became known as Blagdon Lake, enabled the construction of the Wrington Vale Light Railway, from Congresbury on the Cheddar Valley line to Blagdon.

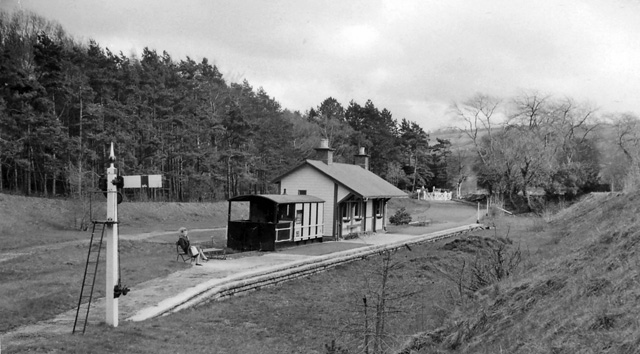
Blagdon railway station

The GWR provided the money and a light railway order was obtained. The line was 6 miles 41 chains (10.5 km) long and the station at Congresbury was substantially altered to accommodate the junction. The line opened on 4 December 1901, with stations at Wrington, Langford, Burrington and Blagdon. There were four passenger trains daily of which one was mixed; they ran to and from Yatton.

=== Closure ===
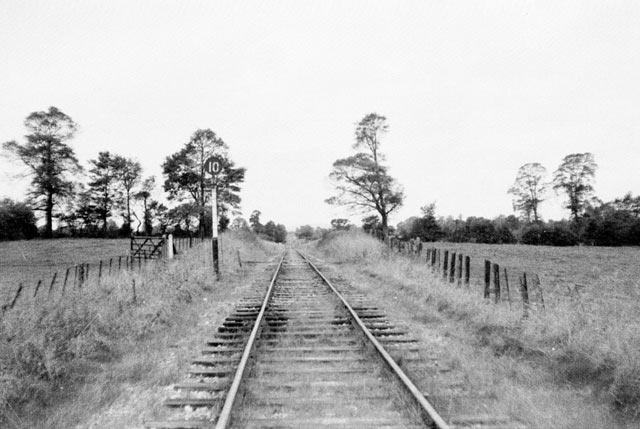
The Wrington Vale Light Railway

Following World War II, road usage increased considerably and rail usage declined, particularly on rural branch lines. The line was being considered for closure when the British Railways Board published the report in 1963, The Reshaping of British Railways often referred to as the Beeching cuts. Accordingly the Cheddar Valley line is listed in the appendix of that report. The line between Yatton and Witham closed to passengers on 9 September 1963 and to goods in 1964.

== Infrastructure ==
=== Route ===
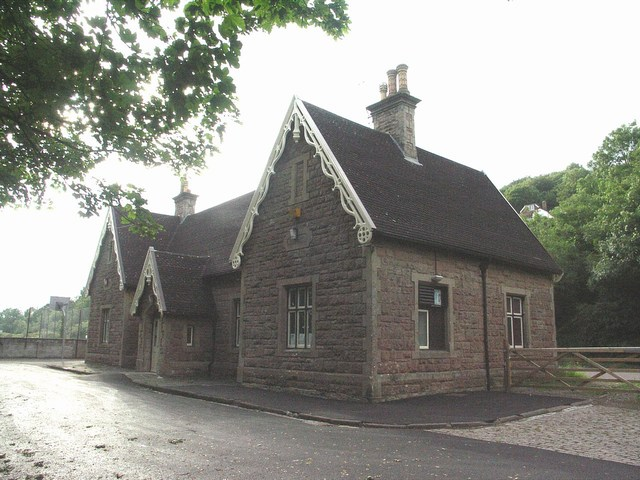
Former Axbridge railway station in the decorative style used for most of the line's stations

The line ran in a general north-west to south-east direction. The "down" direction of trains was from Yatton to Wells Tucker Street, and from Witham to Wells Tucker Street.

Great Western Railway, originally Bristol and Exeter Railway

- Yatton station; junction with the main Bristol to Taunton line

Cheddar Valley and Yatton Branch

- Congresbury station; originally a single platform, but expanded with a crossing loop 14 April 1901 to form the junction for the Wrington Vale Light Railway
- Sandford and Banwell station; opened as Sandford and renamed in 1869; considerable traffic was generated from a nearby quarry, which had a short tramway branch south-east of the station;
- Winscombe station; opened as Woodborough, and renamed to Winscombe on 1 December 1869;
- Axbridge station;
- Cheddar station; the lavish station building with over-all roof was not ready at the opening of the line, and passengers were accommodated in the goods shed until 9 or 10 May 1870;
- Draycott station;
- Lodge Hill station; the adjacent settlement was Westbury-sub-Mendip, but that name was not chosen to avoid confusion;
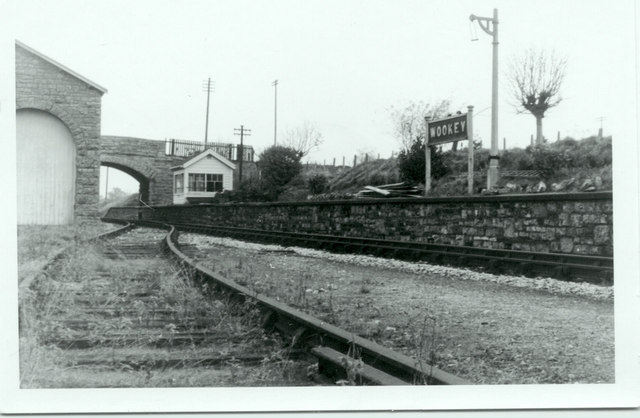
- Wookey Station
  Wookey station; opened 1 August 1871;
- Wookey Stone Sidings; opened by Somerset County Council in 1922 to serve their Underwood Quarry by means of an aerial ropeway. The ropeway became redundant in 1936 and was dismantled in 1948.
- Wells; renamed Wells Tucker Street on 12 July 1920 although, with three "Wells" stations in the city, the specifier had been used long before, e.g. in Bradshaw in 1877;

Somerset Central Railway, later Somerset and Dorset Joint Railway

- Wells station; the Somerset Central station, opened in May 1862; it was at the end of a branch from Glastonbury which opened on 15 March 1859; it was worked by the B&ER at this stage, and passenger trains used the B&ER Yatton and Cheddar Valley station, the later Tucker Street, until the Somerset Central station opened in May 1862; this must have involved a reversal; when the GWR/B&ER trains were permitted to run through, they did not call at the SCR station; it was renamed Wells Priory Road from October 1883; from 1 October 1934 GWR trains did start calling at the SCR station as well as their own station close by; the Glastonbury line, and this station, closed on 29 October 1951;

East Somerset Railway

- Wells station; the original East Somerset Railway terminus had a single platform and an all-over roof; the passenger station was always known simply as Wells; when the through line opened, this passenger station closed, but the goods yard was the GWR's main goods facility in the town; it was known as East Somerset Yard;
- Dulcote Quarry siding; there were several quarry faces close to the railway on the north side, and loading was to a siding adjacent to the main line; the quarrying activity was increased by Foster Yeoman from 1923, and the siding accommodation was expanded in 1927, but closed in 1975;
- Shepton Mallet station; at first the terminus of the line from Witham; the second platform was opened on 8 January 1895; renamed Shepton Mallet High Street from 26 September 1949
- Doulting siding; highest point on the line; served Chelynch Quarry, connected by a tramway; rail use ceased in 1948 although the quarry is still in operation;
- Cranmore station; originally a single platform; passing loop and second platform opened on 11 September 1904; the Mendip Granite Works was adjacent to the station, and a 2 ft (610 mm) tramway ran north to the Waterlip Quarry; the tramway was extended in 1907 to the Somerset Basalt Quarry, and was converted to standard gauge in 1926; the artist David Shepherd used the station from 1971 to house steam locomotives he owned, and over time the location has developed into a heritage railway site, known as the East Somerset Railway;
- Merehead Quarry Sidings; a siding connection to quarries was opened on 14 March 1948; with the huge expansion of roadstone use in the late 1960s, the quarry was much mechanised, and became known as Torr Works; the rail loading facility was much expanded, and the new arrangement was opened on 19 August 1970;
- Wanstrow; station opened in January 1860 having been paid for by the local community "as the ESR could not afford to build one"; there was no staff until 1 April 1909 when a Station Master was appointed; it appears he had to do all the station work himself;

Great Western Railway, Wilts, Somerset and Weymouth section

- Witham station; the junction station; the community served is Witham Friary; the main line became much busier on the opening in 1906 of the direct line between Castle Cary and Taunton via Somerton, so that most of the West of England trains ran this way; there was an up side bay for Cheddar line trains; renamed Witham (Somerset) from 9 June 1958.

=== Gradients ===
From Yatton the line ran more or less level at first, then climbing to Shute Shelve Tunnel at 1 in 90, falling on the other side at 1 in 75. Gentle undulations followed to a summit between Lodge Hill and Wookey, climbing at 1 in 96. A slight fall followed to Wells. Leaving Wells the line climbed for over 6 miles to Dulcote at 1 in 46½ for much of the distance. The falling gradient the other side had a ruling gradient of 1 in 47, although with some short sections of gentler climb.

=== Signalling ===
The original signalling on the East Somerset Railway followed the Wilts, Somerset and Weymouth Railway practice of using a double-needle electric telegraph; the signals at each station were disc and crossbar home signals; starting was authorised by hand signal. The GWR replaced the double-needle telegraph by a single-needle variety.

The Bristol and Exeter line (north-west of Wells) used a staff-and-ticket system, but the Somerset Central line, worked by them, used a block telegraph system, upgraded to train staff and ticket by 1886 and to electric train staff in 1895.

The electric train staff system was installed on 11 May 1896, and certain stations that were not crossing places—Congresbury, Winscombe, Draycott, Dulcote Siding and Doulting Siding—were downgraded, and the points there worked by Annett's key attached to the train staff. The short sections at Wells (East Somerset to Wells S&D, and Wells S&D to Tucker Street) were worked on a no-staff system using GWR instruments. GWR signals were installed as part of the work.

The electric key token system was installed from 1948 to 1954.

== Present day ==
=== Strawberry Line ===
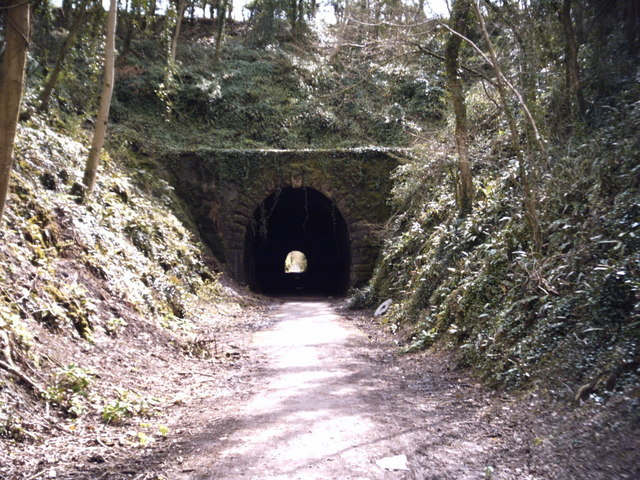
North entrance of Shute Shelve tunnel between Winscombe and Axbridge, part of the cycle route

Much of the disused line between Yatton and Cheddar today forms 'The Strawberry Line', a long distance footpath and part of National Cycle Network route 26.

The trail starts at Yatton railway station and is in good condition most of the way to the site of Congresbury railway station. A new section of path along the top of the Congresbury Yeo river bank avoids the busy A370 road running alongside. At Congresbury the platforms of the former station remain, as do houses built for railway workers. The route on to Sandford is surfaced. Upon reaching the rail bridge on the outskirts of Sandford the trail joins Nye Road for about half a mile (800 m), before turning right into a new off-road link. This passes large orchards before rejoining the track bed for a short stretch to the A368. After crossing the road the site of Sandford and Banwell railway station is visible. The site has been developed as the 'Sandford Station Retirement Village' sheltered housing complex. There is a view of the station, goods shed and platform including a short section of track, with period carriage and open wagons. The station is now restored and open to the public on summer weekends with access from the trail.

The scenery through to Winscombe changes from open moorland to railway cuttings, with the path in condition to match the previous sections. The former station platform is preserved, with a time line of local and world events along its length. The small red bricked façade of the demolished station building has been laid flat into its former foundation. Seats and lighting have been provided and there are public toilets. After Winscombe the line continues south to Shute Shelve Tunnel, which cuts underneath Shute Shelve Hill. Within the tunnel the central surface has been paved with tarmac but it is unlit except for a central guide line of small guide lamps. The north half of the tunnel is brick lined, but about midway it reverts to unlined rock for the southern half, marking a change in the underlying geology from sandstone to limestone. After the tunnel the line continues due south through a deep cutting and onto an embankment as the land falls away until meeting the A38 which a bridge once crossed.

From this point the line turns eastwards and follows the southern edge of the Mendip Hills crossing the Cheddar Yeo. The track bed around Axbridge has now been made into the A371 road, but the station building, goods shed and station master's house are all in use. The Strawberry Line Trail goes through the town itself missing out the station site higher on the hillside behind the church.

The railway track is regained opposite St Michael's Cheshire Home and there is a picnic spot overlooking the reservoir. The route comes to an end at the side of the former station which is now in use as a stonemason's surrounded by a small industrial estate, a mile (1.6 km) from Cheddar Gorge. It also includes parts of the Biddle Street Site of Special Scientific Interest.

A campaign supported by local councils seeks to extend the trail westwards from Yatton to Clevedon (along the Clevedon branch line, which was a distinct branch and not part of the Cheddar Valley Line), and eastwards from Cheddar to Wells and Shepton Mallet. Two sections on the wells extension had been opened by September 2022: a short stretch between Haybridge and Wells, and 1 mile (1.6 km) between Wells and Dulcote Quarry. A new bridge was opened in October 2024 to carry the path over the B3136 road in Shepton Mallet.

The Ramblers named the Strawberry Line as Britain's favourite path in 2026, describing at as "a fantastic example of how local communities can benefit from paths being opened up and expanded".

== Reopening proposals ==
The Campaign for Better Transport group lists the line as having potential for reopening. Proposals to restore a passenger service from the Heart of Wessex Line at Witham to Shepton Mallet are endorsed by Mendip District Council and Wells MP James Heappey.

== Features ==
Point	Coordinates (links to map & photo sources)	Notes
Yatton railway station	51.391°N 2.8278°W	Start of railway line
Congresbury railway station	51.3667°N 2.8167°W	Platforms remain
Sandford and Banwell railway station	51.332029°N 2.839327°W	Restored, heritage centre open summer weekends
Winscombe railway station	51.315244°N 2.835159°W	Now the village's "Millennium Green"
Shute Shelve tunnel north portal	51.302049°N 2.830814°W	Tunnel under a narrow point in the Mendip Hills
Shute Shelve tunnel south portal	51.300291°N 2.830806°W	
Axbridge railway station	51.288349°N 2.816319°W	Now Axbridge & Cheddar Valley Sea Cadet Unit
Cheddar railway station	51.27562°N 2.783929°W	Some buildings now used by Wells Cathedral Stonemasons
Draycott railway station	51.25279°N 2.754661°W	
Lodge Hill railway station	51.232923°N 2.71946°W	The trackbed was formerly Westbury-sub-Mendip airfield
Wookey railway station	51.21423°N 2.672499°W	
Wells (Tucker Street) railway station	51.206752°N 2.655371°W	Now covered by the city centre bypass
Wells (Priory Road) railway station	51.204161°N 2.65301°W	
