= Witham (Somerset) railway station =

Railway station in Somerset, England

Coordinates: 51.167006°N 2.365204°W

Witham (Somerset)
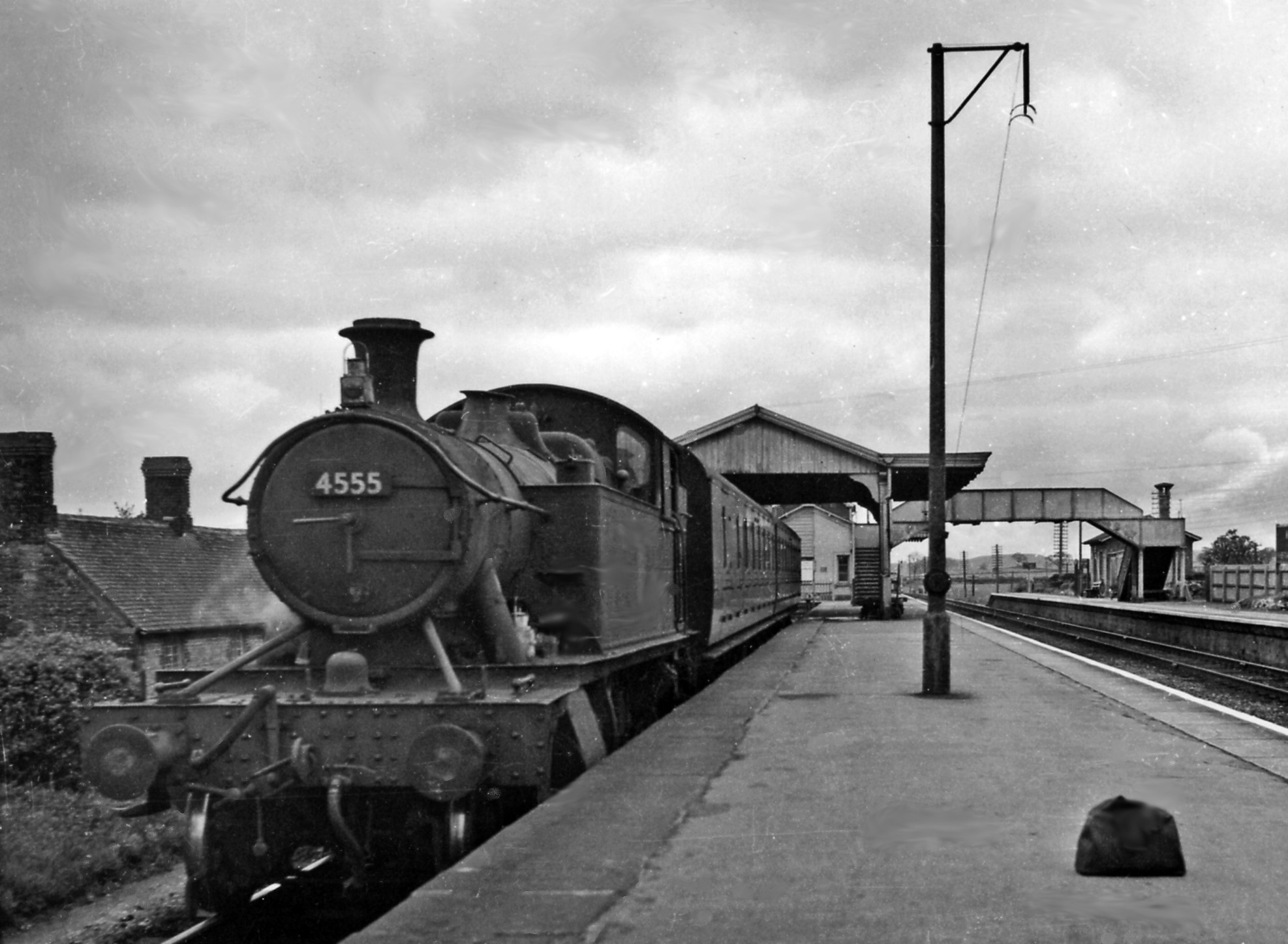
- Train waiting in the Down Bay in 1958

General information
- Location: Witham Friary; England
- Platforms: 3+Bay Platform

Other information
- Status: Disused

History
- Original company: Wilts, Somerset and Weymouth Railway
- Pre-grouping: Great Western Railway

Key dates
- 1 September 1856: Opened
- 9 June 1958: Renamed Witham (Somerset)
- 3 October 1966: Closed
Location

This station in Somerset is closed. For the open station in East Anglia, see Witham railway station.

Witham (Somerset) railway station was a station serving the Somerset village of Witham Friary and was located on the Frome to Yeovil section of the Wilts, Somerset and Weymouth Railway that opened in 1856.

In 1858, the East Somerset Railway opened a branch line from Witham first to Shepton Mallet and then, in 1862, to Wells; in 1870, this line linked up to the Bristol and Exeter Railway branch from Yatton to Wells, the Cheddar Valley line, and through services began. All of these railways were allied to, and were eventually subsumed within, the Great Western Railway. The Westbury, Wiltshire to Castle Cary section of the WS&WR also later formed part of the GWR's new express route to South-West England, avoiding Swindon, Bath and Bristol, that opened in 1906.

Witham station was known as "Witham" for most of its life, but was renamed "Witham (Somerset)" under British Railways to avoid confusion with the town (and station) of the same name in Essex.

Passenger services on the Yatton to Witham line through Cheddar, Wells and Shepton Mallet were withdrawn in 1963 under the Beeching Axe. The station retained services on the WS&WR route until 1966, when it was one of several village stations on the line to close. The station buildings have now been demolished.

The junction at Witham remains and has been heavily used for freight trains carrying stone from Merehead Quarry, just off the East Somerset line at Quarry Junction. Part of the East Somerset Railway has also been re-opened as a heritage railway, starting at Cranmore.

Today, the Reading to Taunton Line passes through the site of the station.
