= Wells East Somerset railway station =

Former railway station in England

Coordinates: 51°12′N 2°39′W

Wells station in the Somerset city of Wells was the terminus of the East Somerset Railway line from Witham and opened when the line was extended from Shepton Mallet in 1862.

The station was only 100 yards (90 m) or so from Wells' first station, the terminus of the Somerset Central Railway branch from Glastonbury, which had opened in 1859, and which would later be renamed as Wells (Priory Road). The East Somerset Railway, though nominally independent, was controlled by the Great Western Railway.

In 1870, the Cheddar Valley line from Yatton railway station also reached Wells, where a third station, later to be known as Wells (Tucker Street) was opened. This line too was controlled by the GWR and in the late 1870s a spur line was built to connect the Cheddar Valley line to the East Somerset line, passing through the Priory Road station, though trains did not stop there until 1934. This connecting line opened in 1878, at which time the original East Somerset Railway station in Wells closed, and GWR traffic was concentrated on Tucker Street.

The station building, minus its canopy, was later used as a cheese factory by a company called Marsh and Adams, but was destroyed by fire in 1929. The line through the site continued in operation until closure in 1963.
