= Cranmore, Somerset =

Village in Somerset, England

Coordinates: 51.1896°N 2.4787°W

Cranmore
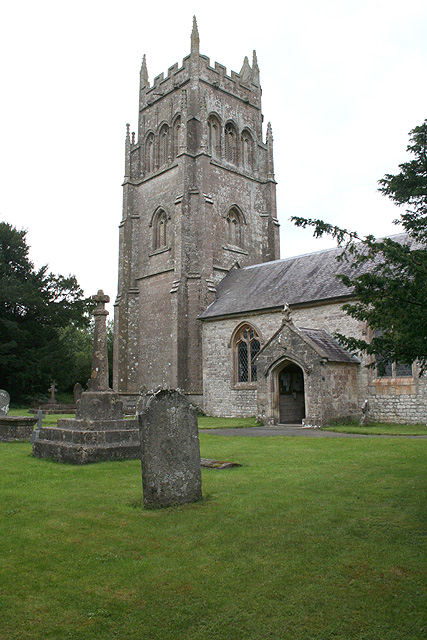
- Church of St Bartholomew, Cranmore

- Location within Somerset
- Population: 667 (2011)
- OS grid reference: ST665435
- Unitary authority: Somerset
- Ceremonial county: Somerset
- Region: South West
- Country: England
- Sovereign state: United Kingdom
- Post town: SHEPTON MALLET
- Postcode district: BA4
- Dialling code: 01749
- Police: Avon and Somerset
- Fire: Devon and Somerset
- Ambulance: South Western
- UK Parliament: Frome and East Somerset

Cranmore is a village and civil parish east of Shepton Mallet, in Somerset, England. The parish includes the hamlets of Waterlip, East Cranmore and Dean. In 2011 the parish had a population of 667.

== History ==
The name comes from Crane Mere, the Lake of the Cranes.

The parish of Cranmore was part of the hundred of Wells Forum. East Cranmore was part of the hundred of Frome.

It is the base of the East Somerset Railway which plays host to a variety of preserved diesel and steam locomotives. It operates the line between Cranmore railway station, Cranmore West, Merryfield Lane Halt, and Mendip Vale. The section between Cranmore and the mainline is used for heavy quarry traffic to the nearby Merehead Quarry. The quarry, which is also known as Torr Works, covers an area of some 200 hectares, including 60 hectares which have been landscaped to blend with the surrounding countryside. It was once operated by the Foster Yeoman Company, but is now owned and operated by Aggregate Industries LTD, employing over 200 people and produces 6 million tonnes of limestone annually which is carried directly from the quarry by Mendip Rail.

Cranmore Hall is a large 17th-century country house with landscaped gardens which now forms the main portion of All Hallows Preparatory School. Southill House is a smaller country house dating from the early 18th century which was refaced by John Wood, the Younger.

Dean farmhouse dates from the 17th century, as does The Old Smithy, just off the A361 which was originally two residential dwellings before being finally "knocked through" to just one.

On a hill north of the village is the 45 metres (148 ft) tall Victorian folly, Cranmore Tower, built in 1862–64 by Thomas Henry Wyatt for John Moore Paget. The site is 280 metres (919 ft) above sea level, and is the highest point on the Mendip Way.

== Governance ==
The parish council has responsibility for local issues, including setting an annual precept (local rate) to cover the council's operating costs and producing annual accounts for public scrutiny. The parish council evaluates local planning applications and works with the local police, district council officers, and neighbourhood watch groups on matters of crime, security, and traffic. The parish council's role also includes initiating projects for the maintenance and repair of parish facilities, as well as consulting with the district council on the maintenance, repair, and improvement of highways, drainage, footpaths, public transport, and street cleaning. Conservation matters (including trees and listed buildings) and environmental issues are also the responsibility of the council.

For local government purposes, since 1 April 2023, the parish comes under the unitary authority of Somerset Council. Prior to this, it was part of the non-metropolitan district of Mendip (established under the Local Government Act 1972). It was part of Shepton Mallet Rural District before 1974.

Cranmore is in the electoral ward called Cranmore, Doulting and Nunney. At the 2011 Census this had a population of 2,374.

It is also part of the Frome and East Somerset county constituency represented in the House of Commons of the Parliament of the United Kingdom. It elects one Member of Parliament (MP) by the first past the post system of election.

== Landmarks ==
Southill House is an early 18th-century manor house south of the main village. It was given a new facade by John Wood, the Younger, of Bath, in the late 18th century.

Close to Cranmore is a small lake called Torr Works Reservoir which attracts large numbers of roosting gulls.

== Religious sites ==
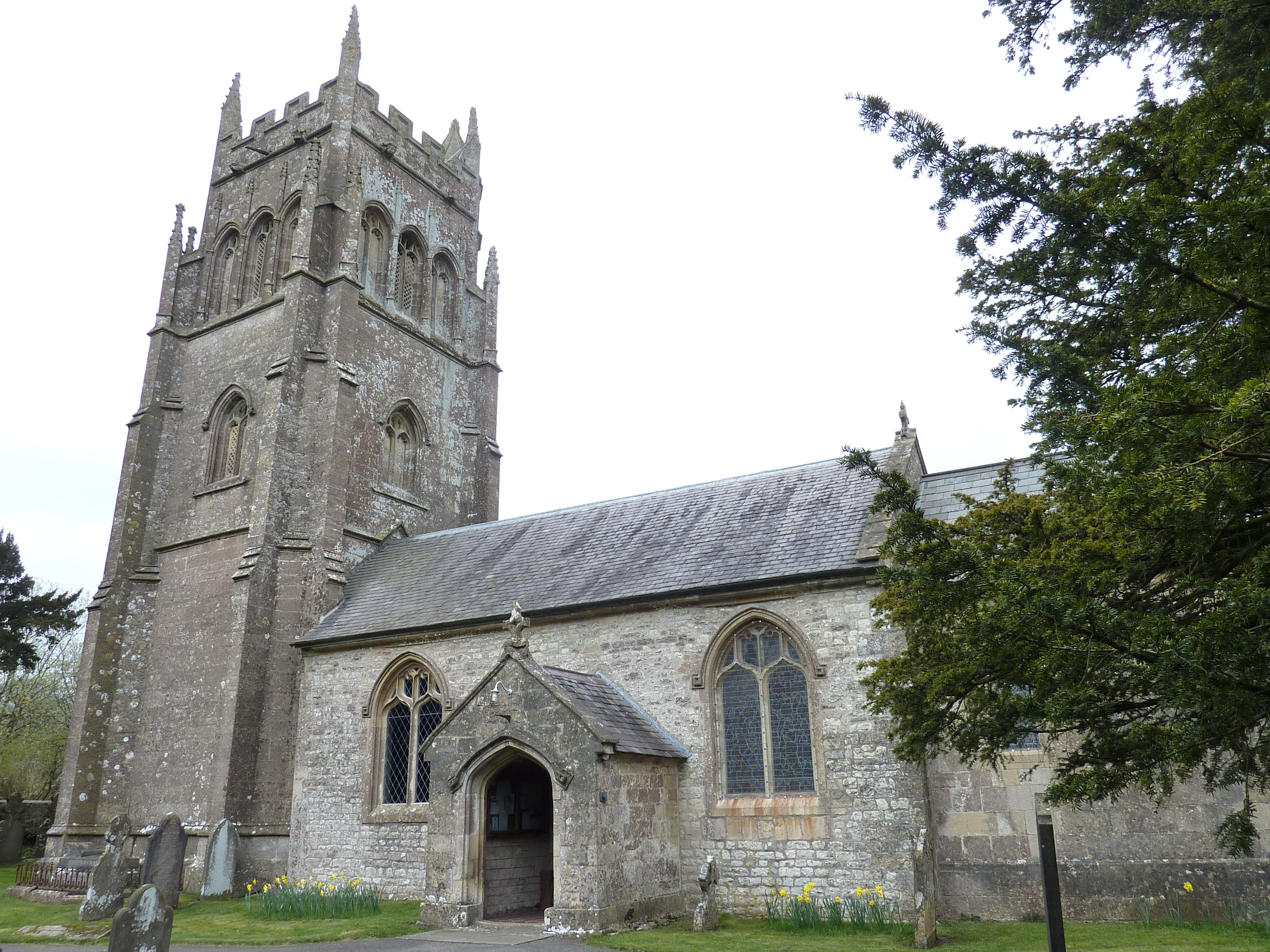
St Bartholomew's Church, Cranmore

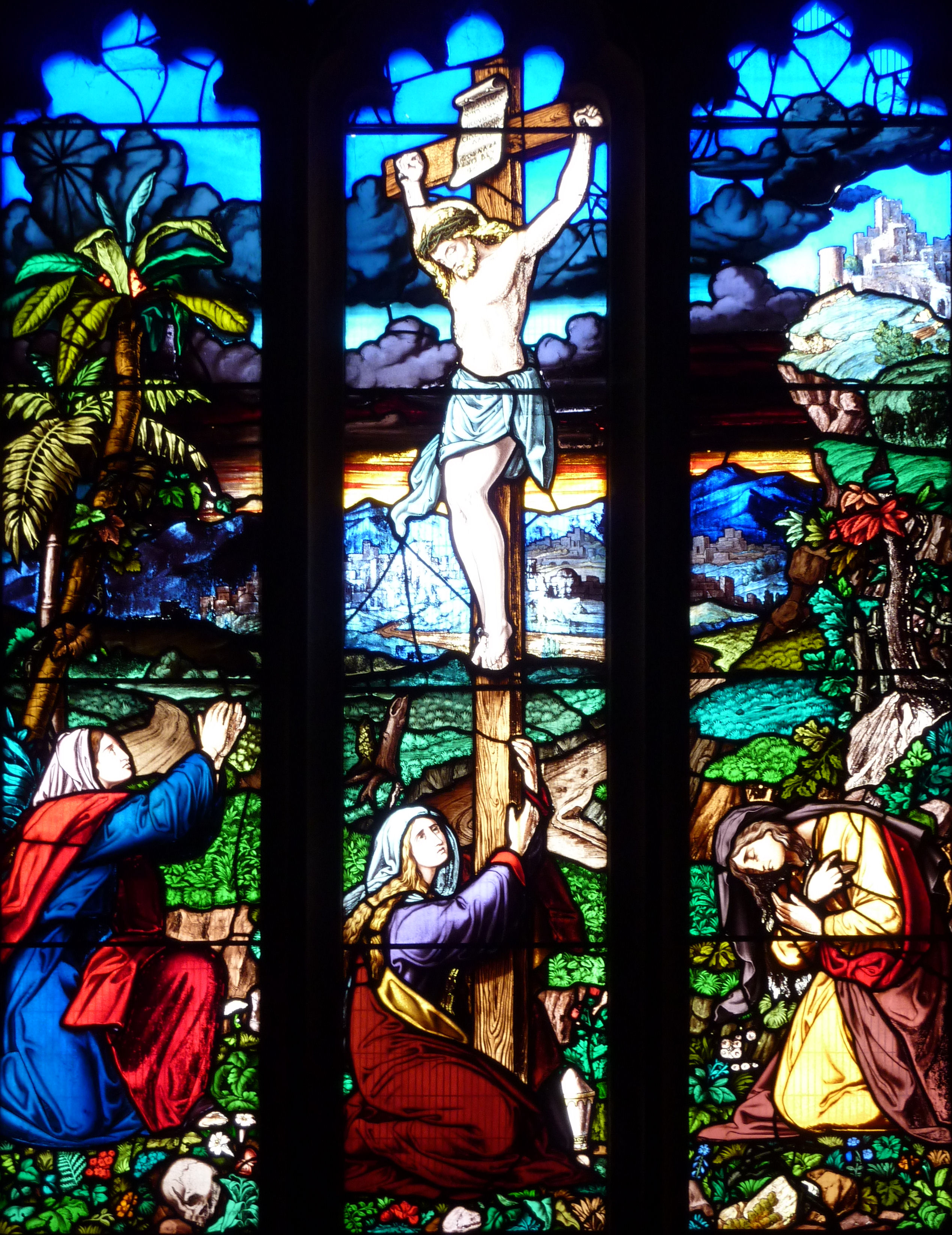
Stained glass window behind altar

The Church of St Bartholomew dates from the 15th century and has been designated by English Heritage as a Grade I listed building. The former church of St James in East Cranmore has been deconsecrated and is now used as a private dwelling.
