= Wells railway station =

Wells railway station may refer to

In Norfolk, England:

- Wells railway station, Norfolk, on the narrow gauge Wells and Walsingham Light Railway
- Wells-On-Sea railway station, a disused station in Wells-next-the-Sea

In Somerset, England:

- Wells East Somerset railway station, the disused station constructed by the East Somerset Railway, later the Great Western Railway goods depot
- Wells (Priory Road) railway station, the disused station constructed by the Somerset and Dorset Joint Railway
- Wells (Tucker Street) railway station, the disused station constructed by the Bristol and Exeter Railway, later operated by the Great Western Railway

In the United States:

- Wells Regional Transportation Center, in Wells, Maine
- Wells Street Station, the terminal of the Chicago and North Western Railway
- Wells Street Terminal, the terminal of the Chicago Aurora and Elgin Railroad
