= Wookey railway station =

Former railway station in England

Wookey
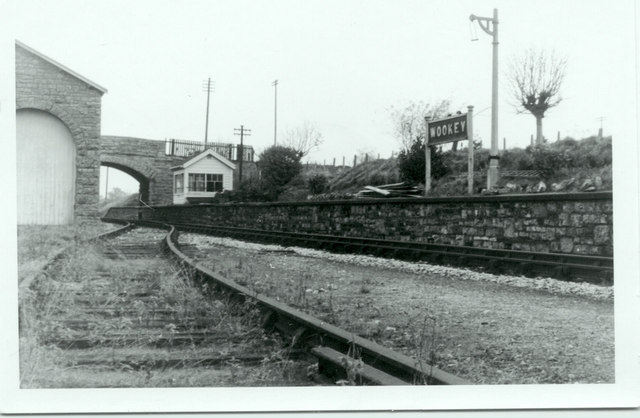
- The railway station before closure

General information
- Location: Wells, Somerset; England
- Coordinates: 51.2142°N 2.6728°W
- Grid reference: ST531463

Other information
- Status: Disused

History
- Original company: Bristol and Exeter Railway
- Pre-grouping: Great Western Railway
- Post-grouping: Great Western Railway

Key dates
- 1 August 1871: Station opened
- 9 September 1963: Station closed
Location

Wookey Station
- Site of Special Scientific Interest
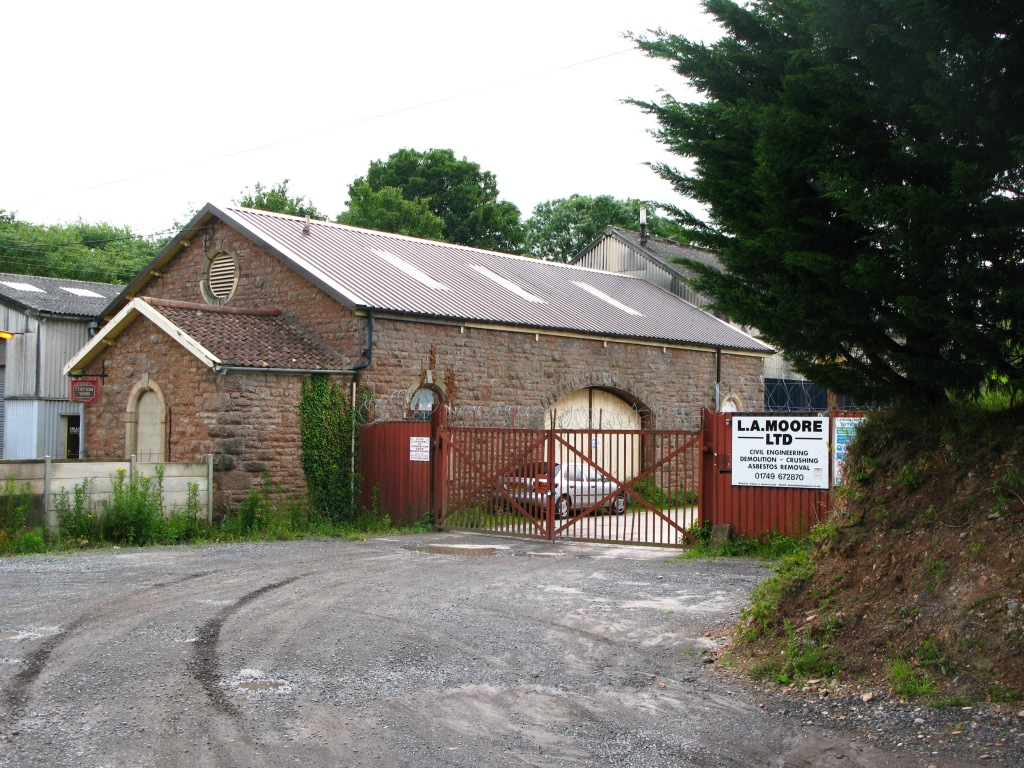
- Location of Wookey Station.
- Area of search: Somerset
- Grid reference: ST531464
- Interest: Geological
- Area: 0.04 hectares (0.00040 km^{2}; 0.00015 sq mi)
- Notification date: 1997

Wookey railway station was a station on the Bristol and Exeter Railway's Cheddar Valley line in Somerset, England. The site is a 0.04 hectare geological Site of Special Scientific Interest between Wells and Wookey Hole.

== History ==
The station opened on 1 August 1871 about a year after the extension of the broad gauge line from Cheddar to Wells had been built. The line was converted to standard gauge in the mid-1870s and then linked up to the East Somerset Railway to provide through services from Yatton to Witham in 1878. All the railways involved were absorbed into the Great Western Railway in the 1870s.

The station was host to a GWR camp coach from 1935 to 1939.

The station closed when the line closed to passengers on 9 September 1963, though goods traffic continued to the paper mills at Wookey until 1965. Wookey station had a small wooden building, unlike some of the other stations on the line which had impressive stone buildings. The site was cleared after closure.

Preceding station	Disused railways	Following station
Lodge Hill; Line and station closed	Cheddar Valley Railway; Great Western Railway	Wells (Tucker Street); Line and station closed

== Site of Special Scientific Interest ==
It is listed in the Geological Conservation Review because of the exposure of a 3-metre (9.8 ft) thick sequence of Pleistocene-aged cryoturbated gravels which exhibit scour-and-fill structures in their lower part. A small, silty channel-infilling has yielded an assemblage of palynomorph spores dating from the last (Devensian) glacial period.

== See also ==
- Bruton Railway Cutting
