= Cranmore West railway station =

Railway station in Cranmore, UK

Cranmore West
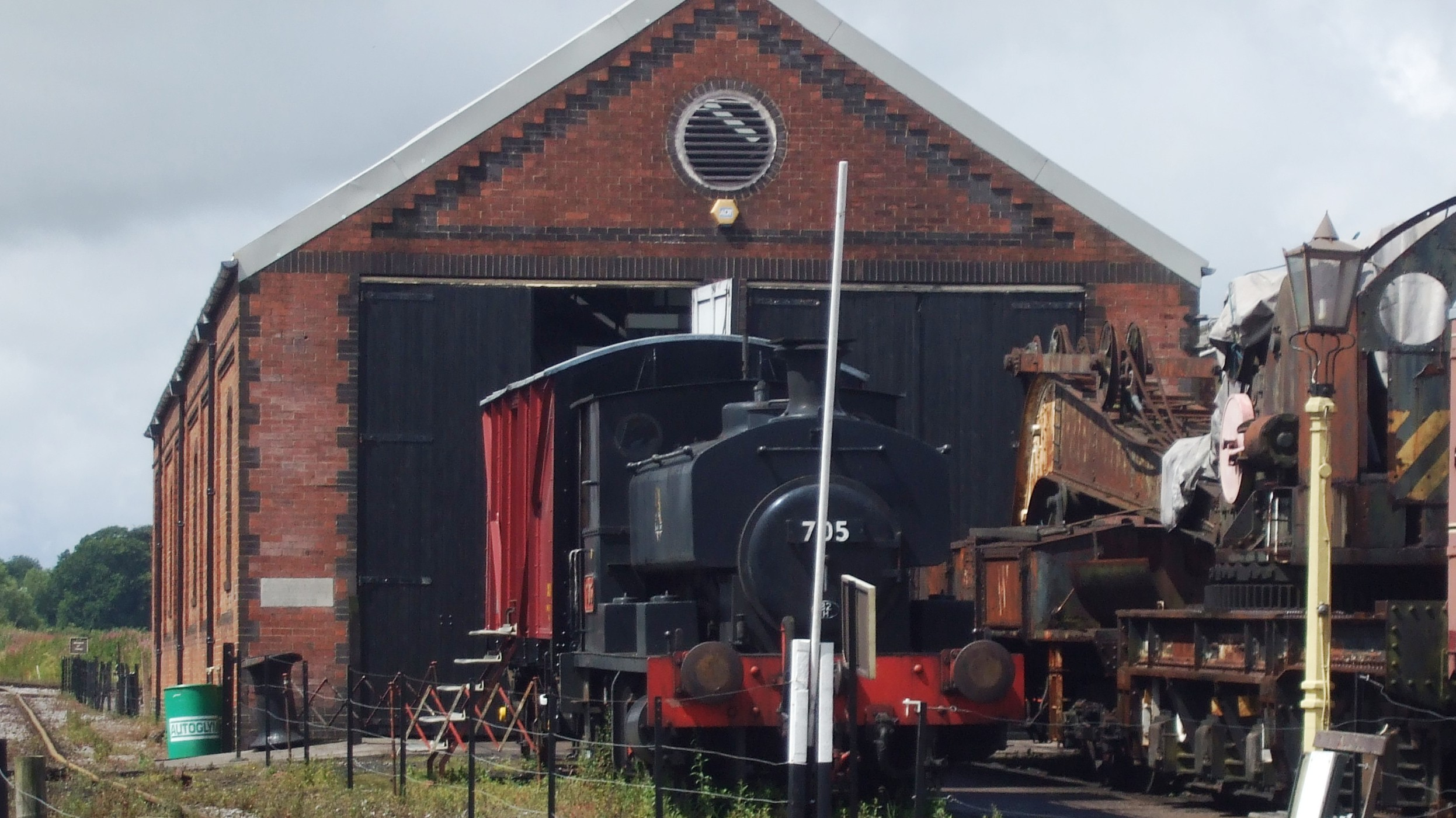
- The Engine Shed

General information
- Location: Cranmore, Somerset; England
- Coordinates: 51.184°N 2.483°W
- Grid reference: ST663428
- System: Station on heritage railway
- Operator: East Somerset Railway
- Platforms: 1
Location

Cranmore West is a disused railway station on the East Somerset Railway.

== Services ==
Services ceased calling at the beginning of the 2022 season, pending station repairs. Most regular services used to stop at Cranmore West to allow visitors to see the engine shed.

== Facilities ==
The station - of which the platforms have been removed - used to provide visitors with benches and there are toilets across the line at the locomotive sheds. The East Somerset Railway's shed and workshop are both located here as well as the Sentinel Diesel Preservation Group's (SDPG) and Cranmore Traincare and Maintenance Service's (CTMS) sheds. The main shed consists of a 2 road shed with an inspection pit on one road. It was built by David Shepherd to be able to contain both 75029 'Green Knight' and 92203 'Black Prince' on one road. A small yard surrounds the facility and there is a footpath from Cranmore West station which connects with Cranmore station. Coaling and watering facilities are also located here for steam locomotives.

== History ==
Operations on the East Somerset Railway originally started at Cranmore West because Cranmore was still being used for BR freight traffic. The platform was built using materials from the 1928 Ilton Halt formerly of the Chard branch line. The platform was reconstructed and became Cranmore West in 1978.

== See also ==
- East Somerset Railway

Preceding station	Heritage railways	Following station
Merryfield Lane towards Mendip Vale	East Somerset Railway	Cranmore Terminus
