= Polsham railway station =

Former railway station in England

Coordinates: 51.1825°N 2.6922°W

Polsham
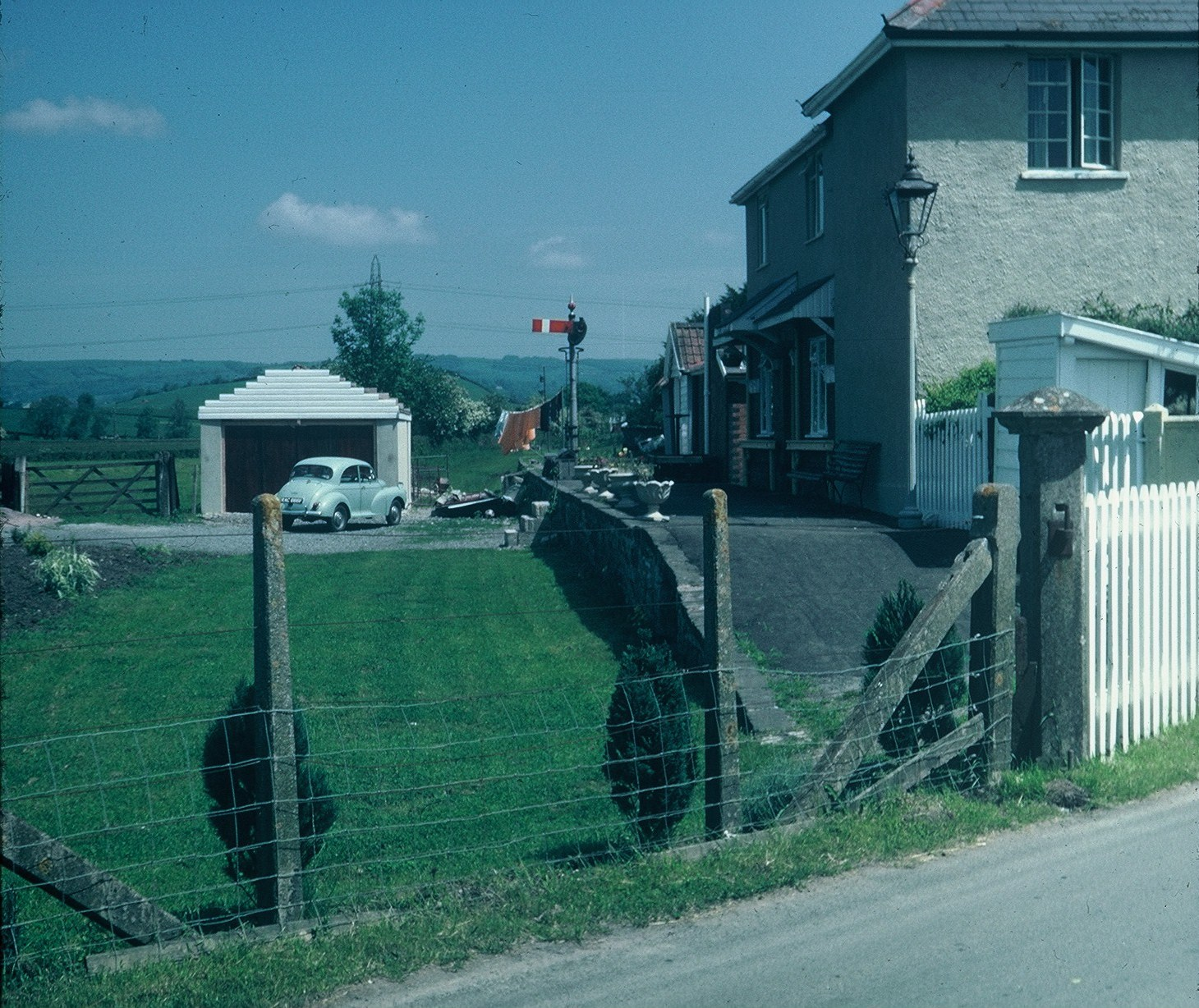
- The site of the station in 1979

General information
- Location: Polsham, Somerset; England
- Grid reference: ST517428
- Platforms: 1

Other information
- Status: Disused

History
- Pre-grouping: Somerset Central Railway
- Post-grouping: SR and LMS; Southern Region of British Railways

Key dates
- December 1861: Opened (Polsham)
- July 1938: Renamed (Polsham Halt)
- 29 October 1951: Closed
Location

Polsham was a railway station on the Somerset and Dorset Railway in the village of Polsham, Somerset in England. It closed in 1951.

Opening in December 1861 on the Somerset Central Railway, which was at that time worked by the Bristol and Exeter Railway, it was the only intermediate station on the short branch from Glastonbury to Wells (Priory Road) railway station, which had opened in 1859. The station consisted of one short platform with a station building, with a single siding for freight. In 1950 unloading of wagons was effected by opening the side door and allowing this to rest on the adjacent fence. A lorry was then driven through an orchard to receive the goods. The siding and the adjacent level crossing were controlled from a small covered ground-frame.

Polsham was downgraded to a halt in 1938, with tickets being sold by the train guard. Only a year before closure, six of the seven different types of ticket that were issued by the guard for travel from Polsham were still marked as being issued by the "Somerset & Dorset Joint Railway Committee", an illustration of the poor usage of the line. The station closed with the Wells branch in 1951.

== The site today ==
The site is now a private house but the platform survives.

Preceding station	Disused railways	Following station
Glastonbury and Street; Line and station closed	Somerset & Dorset Joint Railway; LSWR and Midland Railways	Wells (Priory Road); Line and station closed
