= St James' Church, East Cranmore =

Church in Somerset, England

St James' Church
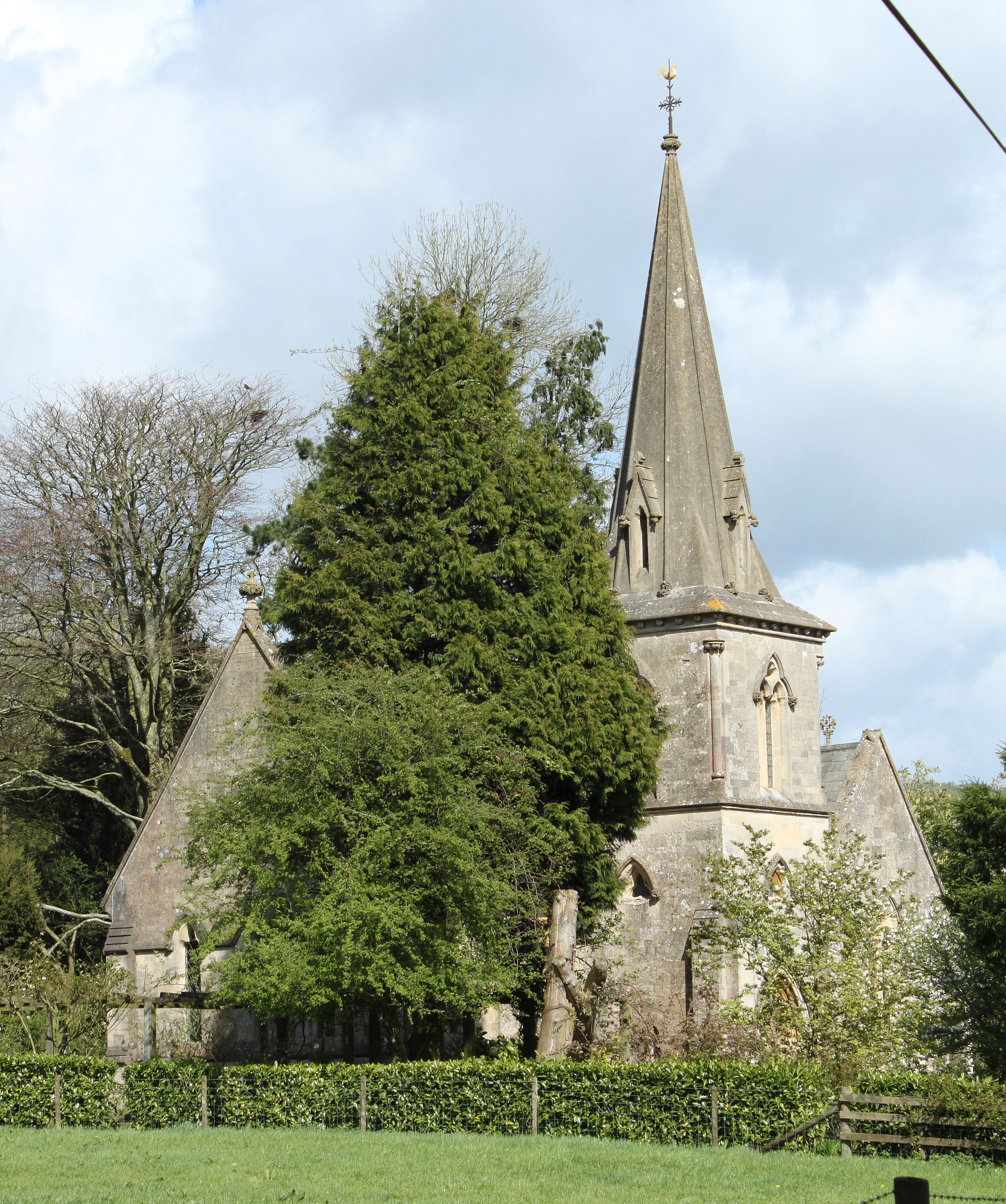

Religion
- Affiliation: Church of England
- Ecclesiastical or organizational status: Closed
- Year consecrated: 1846

Location
- Location: East Cranmore, Somerset, England
- Interactive map of St James' Church
- Coordinates: 51°11′35″N 2°27′26″W

Architecture
- Architect: Thomas Henry Wyatt
- Type: Church

St James' Church is a former Church of England church in East Cranmore, Somerset, England. Designed by Thomas Henry Wyatt, it was built in 1846 to replace an earlier church on the same site and closed in 1958. The church, now a private residence, is a Grade II listed building.

== History ==
St James was built to replace an earlier church of Saxon origin that had been rebuilt in the early 18th-century. Owing to its dilapidated condition, the church was demolished in April 1845 to make way for a new, larger one designed by Thomas Henry Wyatt of London. The new St James was consecrated by the Bishop of Bath and Wells, the Right Rev. Richard Bagot, on 18 August 1846.

The church's spire suffered bomb damage during World War II and the church had to temporarily close in 1946 following further damage from gales. Repairs allowed the church to reopen on 9 February 1947.

The church closed in 1958 and was declared redundant by the Church Commissioners in 1971. It was subsequently sold to a private owner and planning was approved for a conversion scheme in 1975. Another conversion scheme for the former church was approved in 1988.

== Architecture ==
St James is built of Doulting freestone, with slate roofs, in the Early Decorated style. It is made up of a five-bay nave, chancel, south transept, north vestry, and south tower, with porch underneath and broach spire above. The church was designed to seat 130 persons. Many of the church's original fittings were carved from oak, including the open hammer-beam roof, open sittings, communion table, reading desk and pulpit.
