= Pylle railway station =

Former railway station in England

Coordinates: 51.1477°N 2.5470°W

Pylle

General information
- Location: Pylle, Somerset; England
- Grid reference: ST618389
- Platforms: 2 (later 1 platform)

Other information
- Status: Disused

History
- Pre-grouping: Somerset Central Railway
- Post-grouping: SR and LMS; Western Region of British Railways

Key dates
- 3 February 1862: Opened (Pylle)
- 4 November 1957: Renamed (Pylle Halt)
- 7 March 1966: Closed
Location

Pylle railway station was a station on the Highbridge branch of the Somerset and Dorset Joint Railway. Opened 3 February 1862 on the original S&DJR main line, the railway was reduced to branch status when the extension from Evercreech Junction to Bath was opened. It was built with a passing loop on the single line however the loop was removed in 1929 at the same time as the signal box. It was reduced to halt status on 4 November 1957 and closed with the railway, on 7 March 1966.

== Reading ==
- R.V.J. Butt (1995). The Directory of Railway Stations. Patrick Stephens Ltd. ISBN 1-85260-508-1.

Preceding station	Disused railways	Following station
Evercreech Junction; Line and station closed	Somerset & Dorset Joint Railway; LSWR and Midland Railways	West Pennard; Line and station closed
