= Merryfield Lane railway station =

Railway station in Somerset, England

Merryfield Lane Halt
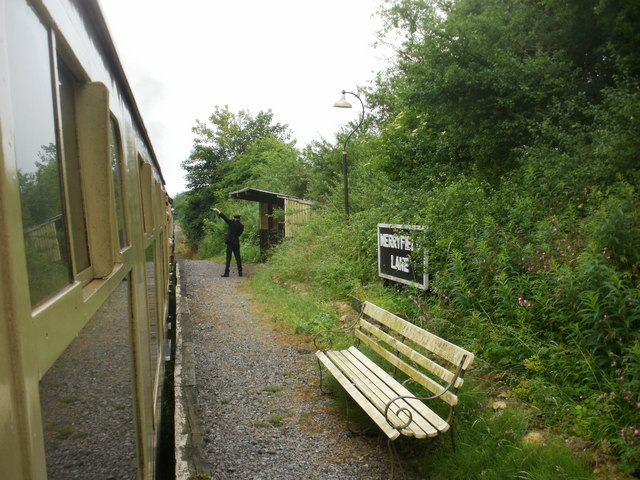

General information
- Location: Doulting, Somerset; England
- Coordinates: 51.181°N 2.498°W
- Grid reference: ST652425
- System: Station on heritage railway
- Operator: East Somerset Railway
- Platforms: 1
Location

Merryfield Lane Halt is a railway station at the summit of the East Somerset Railway. It was built in 1981 and originally served as the terminus of the railway.

== Services ==
Services are no longer advertised to stop at Merryfield Lane, and the location no longer features on the railway's website, although diesel multiple unit trains do stop there.

== Facilities ==
There is a picnic area adjacent to the platform as well as a small hut and benches.

Preceding station	Heritage railways	Following station
Mendip Vale Terminus	East Somerset Railway	Cranmore West towards Cranmore
