= West Pennard railway station =

Former railway station in England

Coordinates: 51.1538°N 2.6206°W

West Pennard

General information
- Location: West Pennard, Somerset; England
- Grid reference: ST568395
- Platforms: 2

Other information
- Status: Disused

History
- Pre-grouping: Somerset Central Railway
- Post-grouping: SR and LMS; Western Region of British Railways

Key dates
- 3 February 1862: Opened
- 7 March 1966: Closed
Location

West Pennard railway station was a station on the Highbridge branch of the Somerset and Dorset Joint Railway. Opened on 3 February 1862, it was reduced to halt status on 25 June 1962. Originally the S&DJR main line, the railway was reduced to branch status when the extension to Bath was built. A passing point on the single line, the station was adjacent to a level crossing on the A361 road from Shepton Mallet to Glastonbury. The station closed with the railway on 7 March 1966.

== The site today ==
The station building has not changed much since closure and is owned by a transport company and used as a house.

Preceding station	Disused railways	Following station
Pylle; Line and station closed	Somerset & Dorset Joint Railway; LSWR and Midland Railways	Glastonbury and Street; Line and station closed

== Reading ==
- R.V.J. Butt (1995). The Directory of Railway Stations. Patrick Stephens Ltd. ISBN 1-85260-508-1.
