= Doulting Railway Cutting =

- Site of Special Scientific Interest
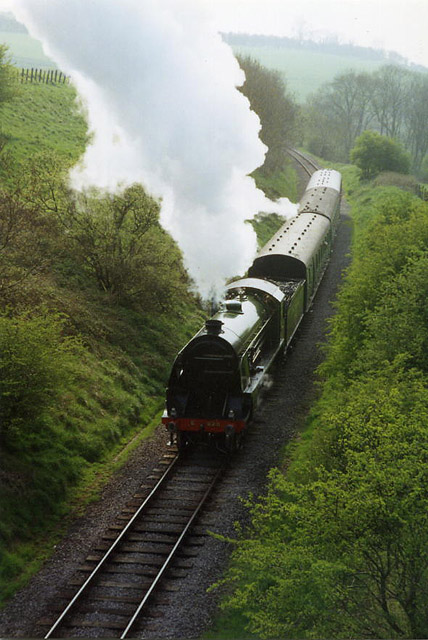

- Location within Somerset
- Location of Doulting Railway Cutting.
- Area of search: Somerset
- Grid reference: ST648424
- Coordinates: 51.17974°N 2.50496°W
- Interest: Geological
- Area: 2.8 hectares (0.028 km^{2}; 0.011 sq mi)
- Notification date: 1971

Doulting Railway Cutting (grid reference ST648424) is a 2.8 hectare geological Site of Special Scientific Interest in Somerset, notified in 1971.

The cutting was made in the 1850s for the East Somerset Railway which still runs steam trains through the cutting today.

It shows rocks of the Middle Jurassic period including both the Inferior Oolite/Great Oolite Junction and the Bajocian-Bathonian stage boundary.

== Sources ==
- English Nature citation sheet for the site (accessed 7 August 2006)
