= St Bartholomew's Church, Cranmore =

Church in Somerset, England

Church of St Bartholomew
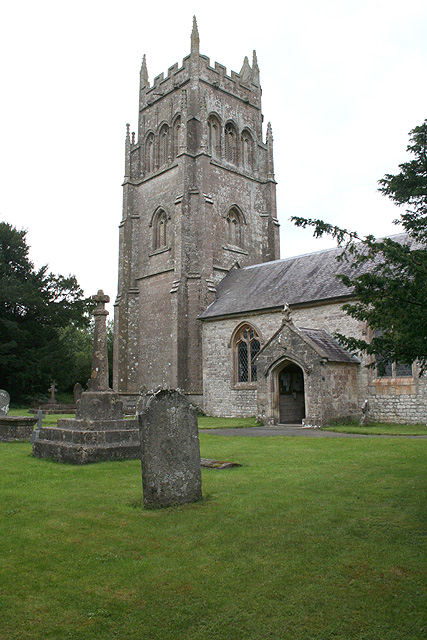

- Location within Somerset

General information
- Architectural style: perpendicular
- Location: Cranmore, Somerset, England
- Coordinates: 51.1882°N 2.4761°W
- Completed: 15th century

The Anglican Church of St Bartholomew in Cranmore, Somerset, England, dates from the 15th century and has been designated as a Grade I listed building.

The chancel was rebuilt in 1848 in a perpendicular early English style. It has a three-stage embattled tower, supported by buttresses with corner pinnacles, tracery and gargoyles. There is a stone fan vault under the tower.

The interior of the church includes wall monuments, particularly to the Strode family, and Chetham family of Southill House. There is a funeral bier dating from 1597.

The church falls within the benefice of St Peter and St Paul, Shepton Mallet which also includes St Aldhelm, Doulting, which is part of the archdeaconry of Wells.

== See also ==
- List of Grade I listed buildings in Mendip
- List of towers in Somerset
