= Cranmore railway station =

Preserved railway station in England

Cranmore
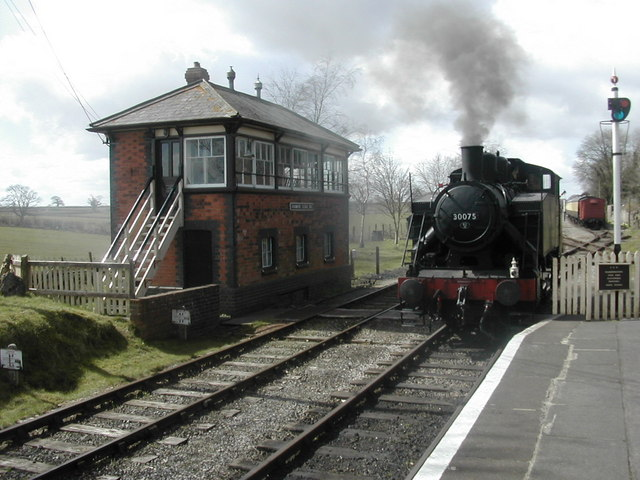
- Locomotive 30075 pulls into Cranmore station.

General information
- Location: Cranmore, Somerset; England
- Coordinates: 51.185°N 2.478°W
- Grid reference: ST666429
- System: Station on heritage railway
- Operator: East Somerset Railway
- Platforms: 1

History
- Original company: East Somerset Railway
- Pre-grouping: Great Western Railway
Location

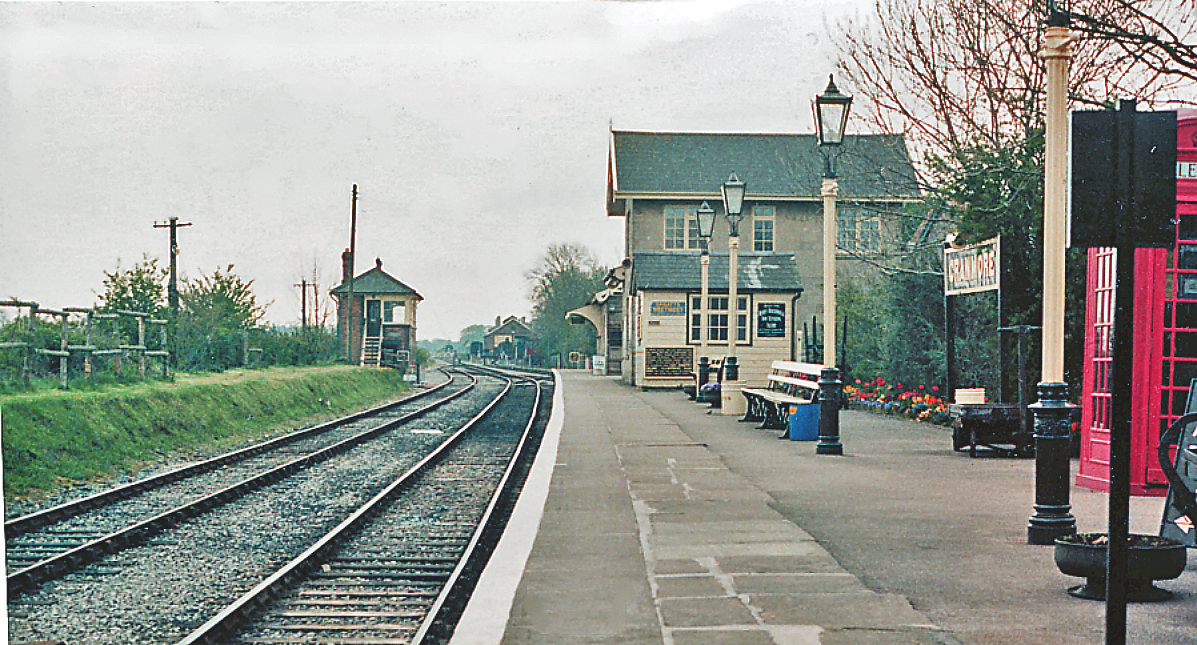
Platform view

Cranmore is the main railway station (and also the headquarters) of the preserved East Somerset Railway, in Somerset, England.

== Services ==
Various services are provided throughout the year, mainly in the spring, summer and autumn months to Mendip Vale. Occasionally, specials are run to Westbury. The station also occasionally receives railtours from further afield such as London.

The station was opened in 1858 to serve the village of Cranmore.

== Facilities ==
The station originally consisted of just the station building located at the west end of the remaining platform (now a museum). The on-platform station house and main station building were both built during preservation and provide much better services to passengers. The station has a signal box located at the west end of the former down platform. This is currently non-operational. Behind it is a miniature railway which runs to Cranmore West.

As the main station and home of the East Somerset Railway, Cranmore station also provides facilities for visitors:

- Car parking
- Children's play area
- Picnic area
- Restaurant
- Toilets
- Shop
- Art gallery
- Footpath to Cranmore West Station via the Engine Shed

Disabled access to the platforms is available.

== Platform 2 rebuild ==
During the station's heyday, Cranmore originally had two platforms, but with the closure in 1960s, the site became derelict. Platform 2 was demolished and was not rebuilt as part of the ESR's restoration at the time. However, with preserved traffic increasing (and as platform 1 sometimes became overcrowded during special events), the ESR has rebuilt the long-demolished platform 2, along with its waiting room as an educational and interpretation centre, enabling volunteers and staff of the ESR to learn new skills and to display the history associated with the preserved line. In 2018, the ESR received £46,500 through National Lottery support. Following the completion of the first phase, in 2019 the ESR received a further grant of £58,700 from the National Lottery Fund to finish the platform 2 and complete other works at the station. This was largely completed at the start of 2020, with the whole platform being constructed and surfaced. Further detail items are in hand which are to be added to the platform.

== See also ==
- East Somerset Railway

| Preceding station | Heritage railways | Following station |
|---|---|---|
| Cranmore West towards Mendip Vale | East Somerset Railway | Terminus |
Disused railways
| Shepton Mallet (High Street) | Great Western Railway; East Somerset Railway | Wanstrow |
