= Wells (Tucker Street) railway station =

Former railway station in Somerset, England

Wells Tucker Street
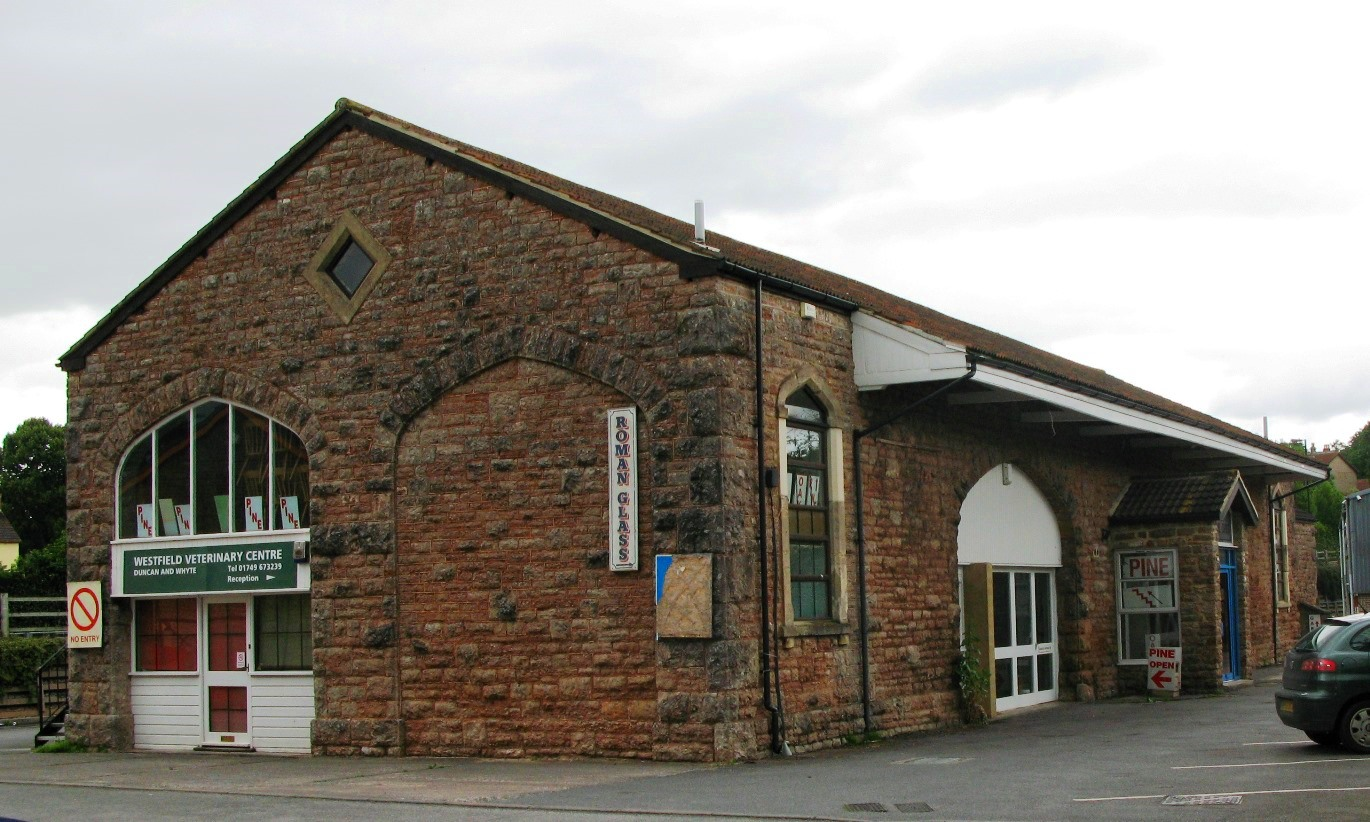
- Tucker Street goods shed (in 2007)

General information
- Location: Wells, Somerset; England
- Coordinates: 51.206752°N 2.655371°W
- Grid reference: ST543454
- Platforms: 2

Other information
- Status: Disused

History
- Pre-grouping: Cheddar Valley and Yatton Railway; GWR
- Post-grouping: GWR; Western Region of British Railways

Key dates
- 1870: Opened as "Wells"
- 1920: Renamed "Wells Tucker Street"
- 1951: Renamed "Wells"
- 1963: Closed
Location

Wells (Tucker Street) railway station was the second terminus station on the Bristol and Exeter Railway's Cheddar Valley line in Somerset after the extension from the first terminus at Cheddar was opened. It was the third station on the third railway to reach the city of Wells and proved to be the longest surviving.

== History ==
The station was opened with the extension of the broad gauge line from Cheddar on 5 April 1870. It was converted to standard gauge in the mid-1870s and then became Wells' main station when the Cheddar Valley line was linked up to the East Somerset Railway to provide through services from Yatton to Witham in 1878.

To achieve this through-running, the Great Western Railway, which had by this time taken over both the Bristol and Exeter and the East Somerset lines, had to run trains over rails owned by the separate Somerset and Dorset Joint Railway and through the S&DJR terminus station at Priory Road to the East Somerset station which was across the street. The East Somerset station at this stage closed, but GWR trains ran through Priory Road without stopping for a further 56 years, until in 1934 they started to call at the S&D station. Priory Road closed in 1951 with the closure of the S&D branch line from Glastonbury and Street, leaving Tucker Street as the only station in Wells.

In fact, as the "main" station on the most direct line from other centres of population, Tucker Street station was known simply as "Wells" for the first 50 years of its life, being renamed only on 12 July 1920. It resumed the Wells name on 29 October 1951 when Priory Road shut.

But Tucker Street station lasted only a dozen years longer. The Yatton to Witham line closed to passengers on 9 September 1963, though goods traffic mostly carrying stone passed through from Cheddar until 1969. The station was demolished soon after closure but the goods shed remains as commercial premises and a row of five houses built for the staff are still standing.

== Services ==
Preceding station	Disused railways	Following station
Wookey; Line and station closed	Cheddar Valley Railway; Great Western Railway	Wells (Priory Road); Line and station closed

== Bibliography ==
- Somerset Railway Stations by Mike Oakley, Dovecote Press, Wimborne, 2002, page 126.
- Quick, Michael (2023). Railway Passenger Stations in Great Britain: A Chronology (PDF) (5th ed.). London: Railway and Canal Historical Society.
