= Wells (Priory Road) railway station =

Former railway station in England

Coordinates: 51°12′15″N 2°39′11″W

Wells Priory Road
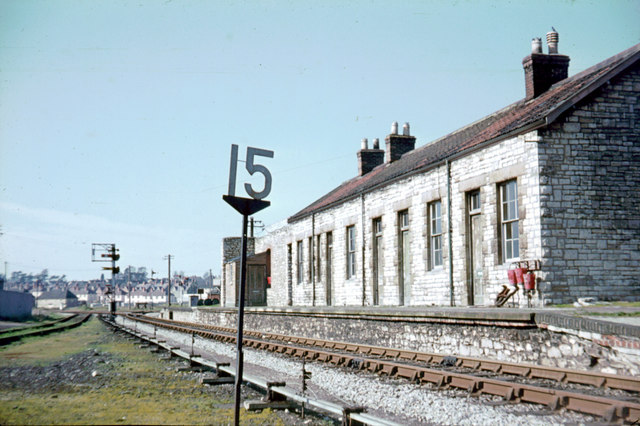
- Priory Road Station c1963

General information
- Location: Wells, Somerset; England
- Grid reference: ST545452
- Platforms: 1

Other information
- Status: Disused

History
- Original company: Somerset Central Railway
- Pre-grouping: Great Western Railway
- Post-grouping: Great Western Railway; Western Region of British Railways

Key dates
- 15 March 1859: Opened (Wells)
- October 1883: Renamed (Wells Priory Road)
- 29 October 1951: Closed
Location

Wells (Priory Road) was a railway station on the Somerset and Dorset Joint Railway at Wells in the county of Somerset in England. Opening on 15 March 1859 as Wells, on the Somerset Central Railway, at that time a broad-gauge line operated by the Bristol and Exeter Railway, prior to that company's amalgamation with the Dorset Central Railway to form the Somerset & Dorset, it was the terminus of the branch from Glastonbury.

The East Somerset Railway, an offshoot of the Great Western Railway-owned Wilts, Somerset and Weymouth Railway, extended its line to Wells in 1862 with its own station to the east of Priory Road. Then in 1870, the Bristol and Exeter Railway's Cheddar Valley Railway from Yatton reached Wells with a third terminus station at Tucker Street to the north west of Priory Road. Finally, in 1878, with all three lines by this time converted to standard gauge, the GWR linked the Cheddar Valley line to the East Somerset line by running over a stretch of the Somerset and Dorset line, including through Priory Road station. The East Somerset station closed on the commencement of through-running, but the through trains did not stop at Priory Road until 1934 and for 56 years passengers from, say, Glastonbury to Cheddar would need to change stations in Wells.

Priory Road adopted the full name in October 1883, and the Cheddar Valley line station was renamed as Tucker Street in 1920.

Priory Road station consisted of one platform with a station building and an overall roof. The adjacent goods yard and junction with the GWR were controlled from a signal box. The station closed to passengers on 29 October 1951 and the train shed roof was taken down soon after, although passenger traffic on the former GWR line through the station continued until 1963, with goods traffic until 1969. The station was demolished after closure and the site is now occupied by the city centre by-pass road.

Preceding station	Disused railways	Following station
Polsham; Line and station closed	Somerset & Dorset Joint Railway; LSWR & Midland Railways	Terminus
Wells (Tucker Street); Cheddar Valley line and station closed	Great Western Railway; East Somerset Railway	Shepton Mallet (High Street); Line and station closed
