= Bristol and Exeter Railway =

Former English railway company

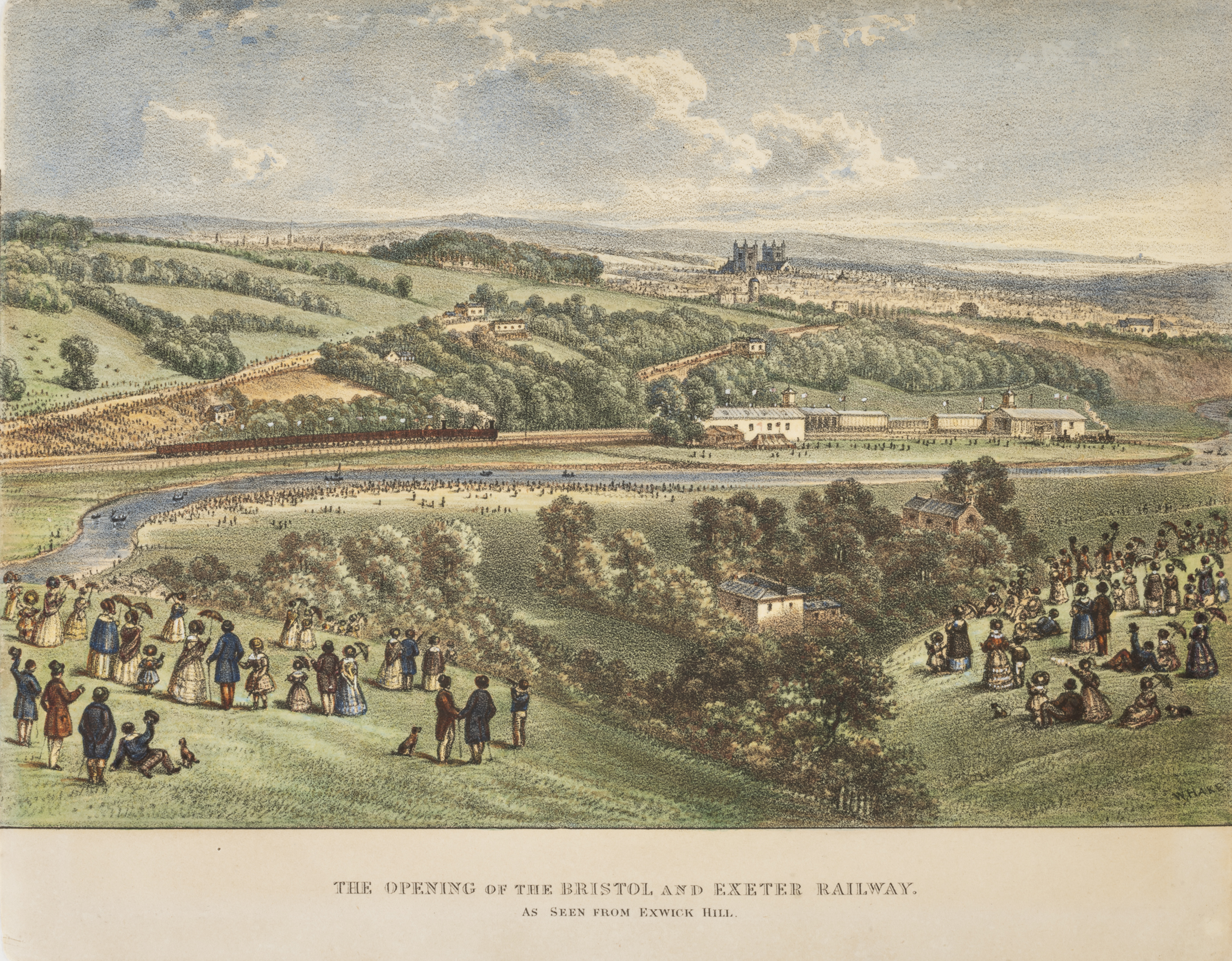
- Exeter in 1844-1850. W Hake's painting shows the opening of the Bristol and Exeter Railway as seen from Exwick Hill.

Overview
- Headquarters: Bristol
- Dates of operation: 1844–1876
- Successor: Great Western Railway

Technical
- Track gauge: 7 ft 1/4 in (2,140 mm)

The Bristol and Exeter Railway (B&ER) was an English railway company formed to connect Bristol and Exeter. It was built on the broad gauge and its engineer was Isambard Kingdom Brunel. It opened in stages between 1841 and 1844. It was allied with the Great Western Railway (GWR), which built its main line between London and Bristol, and in time formed part of a through route between London and Cornwall.

It became involved in the British Gauge War, a protracted and expensive attempt to secure territory against rival companies supported by the London and South Western Railway (LSWR) which used the narrow gauge, later referred to as standard gauge.

At first it contracted with the GWR for that company to work the line, avoiding the expense of acquiring locomotives, but after that arrangement expired in 1849, the B&ER operated its own line. It opened a number of branches within the general area it served: to Clevedon, Cheddar, Wells, Weston-super-Mare, Chard, Yeovil and Tiverton.

The B&ER was financially successful but amalgamated with the GWR in 1876.

== History ==
Summary timeline:

- 1836 – incorporated by act of parliament
- 1841 – opened Bristol Temple Meads to Bridgwater and branch to Weston-super-Mare
- 1842 – extended from Bridgwater to Taunton
- 1842 – extended from Taunton to a temporary terminus at Beam Bridge
- 1844 – main line completed from Beam Bridge to Exeter St Davids
- 1846 – first section of the South Devon Railway opened from Exeter St Davids to Teignmouth
- 1847 – branch opened from Yatton to Clevedon
- 1848 – branch opened from Tiverton Junction to Tiverton
- 1849 – took over its operations (trains had been worked by the GWR up to now) and opened carriage workshops at Bridgwater
- 1851 – started working trains over the Exeter and Crediton Railway; locomotive workshops built at Bristol
- 1853 – branch opened from Durston to Hendford (Yeovil)
- 1854 – headquarters building at Bristol completed; started working trains over the Somerset Central Railway from Highbridge to Glastonbury
- 1857 – Yeovil branch extended to junction with the GWR at Yeovil Pen Mill
- 1858 – Somerset Central Railway extended from Highbridge to Burnham-on-Sea
- 1859 – Somerset Central Railway extended from Glastonbury to Wells
- 1861 – Somerset Central Railway takes over its own operations
- 1862 – London and South Western Railway arrives at Exeter St Davids; B&ER branch opened from Taunton to Watchet
- 1866 – branch opens from Taunton to Chard
- 1867 – branch opens from Bristol to Portishead; mixed gauge laid from Durston to Yeovil and Highbridge
- 1869 – branch opens from Yatton to Cheddar
- 1870 – branch extended from Cheddar to Wells Tucker Street
- 1871 – branch opened from Taunton to Wiveliscombe
- 1873 – branch extended from Wiveliscombe to Barnstaple
- 1874 – Watchet branch extended to Minehead
- 1875 – mixed gauge laid from Bristol to Taunton and on the Weston-super-Mare and Wells branches
- 1876 – amalgamated into the Great Western Railway

=== Formation and construction ===
The Great Western Railway (GWR) obtained its authorising act of Parliament, the Great Western Railway Act 1835 (5 & 6 Will. 4. c. cvii) in 1835, to build its line between London and Bristol. The merchants of Bristol were anxious to secure a railway route to Exeter, an important commercial centre and a port on the English Channel, giving easier shipping connections to continental Europe. They promoted the Bristol and Exeter Railway, and when they issued a prospectus on 1 October 1835 they had little difficulty in securing subscriptions for the £1.5 million scheme.

Bristol and Exeter Railway Act 1836
- Act of Parliament
- Parliament of the United Kingdom
- Long title: An Act for making a Railway from Bristol to Exeter, with Branches to the Towns of Bridgwater in the County of Somerset and Tiverton in the County of Devon.
- Citation: 6 & 7 Will. 4. c. xxxvi
- Territorial extent: United Kingdom

Dates
- Royal assent: 19 May 1836
Other legislation
Relates to	Grand Western Canal Act 1796; Grand Western Canal Act 1811; Grand Western Canal Act 1812

Text of statute as originally enacted

Isambard Kingdom Brunel was appointed engineer (he was also engineer to the GWR) and his assistant William Gravatt surveyed the route, leading to presentation of a parliamentary bill for the 1836 session. The bill had an easy passage and was enacted as the Bristol and Exeter Railway Act 1836 (6 & 7 Will. 4. c. xxxvi) on 19 May 1836. The act did not specify the gauge of the track; branches at Bridgwater and to Tiverton were authorised. Notwithstanding the apparent family connection to the neighbouring GWR, none of the B&ER directors was also a GWR director at this time. This was more than two years before the first section of the GWR was opened in June 1838.

Bristol and Exeter Railway Act 1838
- Act of Parliament
- Parliament of the United Kingdom
- Long title: An Act for making several Branches in the County of Somerset from the Line of the Bristol and Exeter Railway, and for amending the Act relating to such Railway.
- Citation: 1 & 2 Vict. c. xxvi

Dates
- Royal assent: 11 June 1838

Text of statute as originally enacted

The early euphoria turned to great difficulty in raising finance for construction. 4,000 of the 15,000 subscribed shares were forfeited for non-payment of calls before the line was built. A contract was let for the first part of the line, from a temporary terminus at Pylle Hill, west of the New Cut (an arm of the River Avon). The position improved somewhat in 1838, and indeed the company obtained powers in the Bristol and Exeter Railway Act 1838 (1 & 2 Vict. c. xxvi) for four short branches but only the one to Weston-super-Mare was actually built. The company only adopted the broad gauge at a meeting on 5 March 1839.

In the autumn of 1839, the directors informed the half-yearly meeting of shareholders that it was now planned to make a priority of forming the line from Temple Meads (connecting with the GWR there) to Bridgwater in order to generate some income. Five locomotives were ordered from Sharp, Roberts & Co but by the end of 1839 the directors had decided to avoid the cost of buying locomotives and rolling stock by arranging with the GWR to operate the line for them. By this time three directors were also directors of the GWR, and the alliance was beginning to strengthen. The proposal to lease the line to the GWR was ratified by shareholders at a special meeting in September 1841. The lease was to commence on the opening of a double line from Bristol to Bridgwater and Weston-super-Mare, at a rent of £30,000 annually and a toll of a farthing per passenger-mile and per ton-mile of goods and coal (but no toll for mails, parcels, horses, carriages or cattle). The rent was to increase proportionally with the completion of the system, and the lease was to remain in force for five years after completion of the line to Exeter.

=== Opening the main line ===
The company intended to open to Bridgwater on 31 May 1841 but the Board of Trade inspecting officer found deficiencies in the permanent way and refused permission. The directors then planned a private train to take them and shareholders to Bridgwater for an opening ceremony on 31 May but this was put off until 1 June when the locomotive was damaged during a test run on May 30. The director's special was hauled by GWR Firefly Class Fire Ball.

The first section of the line eventually opened between Bristol and Bridgwater on 14 June 1841, a couple of weeks before the GWR completed its line from London to Bristol. It was 33 miles 30 chains (53.7 km; 33.38 mi) in length and double track, with a 1 mi 38 ch (2.4 km; 1.48 mi) single-track branch to Weston-super-Mare. There was no B&ER station at Bristol but trains were to run through from London using the GWR's station which involved them reversing between Bristol Harbour Junction and the platform, however even this was not possible for the first few weeks. The only access between the two lines was by turning the stock one vehicle at a time on turntables until the junction was completed.

The stations on opening were Bristol, Nailsea, Clevedon Road, Banwell, Weston Junction, Highbridge and Bridgwater on the main line. Weston-super-Mare was the only station on its branch, which was operated by horse traction. (Note: Except for the first train from Weston to Bristol and last train from Bristol, horse traction continued at Weston-super-Mare until 1 April 1851.)

Money was slightly easier to come by in 1841 and contracts were let for the completion of the line, which was opened onward from Bridgwater in stages:

- 1 July 1842: Bridgwater to Taunton, 11 mi 45 ch (18.6 km; 11.56 mi)
- 1 May 1843: Taunton to a temporary terminus on the Exeter Turnpike at Beam Bridge, 8 mi 40 ch (13.7 km; 8.50 mi)
- 1 May 1844: Beam Bridge to Exeter, 22 mi 23 ch (35.9 km; 22.29 mi)

A special train from London Paddington to Exeter to mark the opening of the line was driven by Daniel Gooch. Firefly Class Actaeon hauled six carriages, taking 5 hours for the journey down and 10 minutes less for the return. The goods shed at Exeter was used for the celebratory dinner. This completed the B&ER main line, and with the GWR formed a broad gauge railway from London to Exeter with a continuous line of almost 194 miles, far longer than any other line at the time. The directors were able to report that the whole construction had been carried out for the £2 million originally authorised, "a most unusual experience in those days". (Note: £1,500,000 in share capital and £500,000 in debenture loans. The low cost was because of the lease to the GWR the B&ER did not have to purchase locomotives and rolling stock, and the Tiverton branch and the independent station at Bristol had not yet been built.)

The B&ER subscribed to other broad gauge railways that were projected west of Exeter. It bought £200,000 of shares in the South Devon Railway Company (SDR) in 1844 and provided 5 of the 21 directors. A subscription was offered to the Cornwall Railway jointly with the Great Western Railway, South Devon Railway and the Bristol and Gloucester Railway who together were known as the 'Associated Companies', and the B&ER eventually bought £112,000 of shares when they were made available in 1852. In 1861 the Associated Companies (now just the B&ER, GWR and SDR) leased the Cornwall Railway and in 1867 they took over the West Cornwall Railway. The first section of the SDR opened from the B&ER station at Exeter to Teignmouth on 30 May 1846 and was completed to Plymouth Millbay in 1849. The Cornwall Railway opened from Plymouth to Truro in 1859 where it made a connection with the West Cornwall Railway to Penzance, albeit with a break of gauge until 1866.

Bristol and Exeter Railway Act 1845
- Act of Parliament
- Parliament of the United Kingdom
- Long title: An Act to amend the Acts relating to the Bristol and Exeter Railway, and to authorize the Formation of a Junction Railway and several Branch Railways connected with the same.
- Citation: 8 & 9 Vict. c. clv

Dates
- Royal assent: 31 July 1845

In the early part of 1844, with the main line nearly complete, the B&ER promoted a branch from near Taunton to Yeovil and Weymouth on the south coast. The B&ER obtained authorisation in the Bristol and Exeter Railway Act 1845 (8 & 9 Vict. c. clv) for three branches to Yeovil (not all the way to Weymouth), Clevedon, and Tiverton. (Note: The Tiverton branch proved especially contentious due to the determined opposition of the Grand Western Canal, which foresaw the end of any income; when the parliamentary opposition was overcome, the canal company offered every obstruction in the construction of the railway crossing. The B&ER leased the Grand Western Canal for £2,000 a year from 1852, and purchased it outright for £30,000 by the Bristol and Exeter Railway Act 1863 (26 & 27 Vict. c. lx).) The same act authorised a new line at Bristol, continuing straight through the GWR's terminus, across the river and joining the existing B&ER line at Bedminster. This would have removed any need to shunt in and out of the GWR's terminal platforms and a direct junction line at Bristol connecting its line with the GWR but was never built as the GWR and Bristol and Gloucester Railway declined to contribute towards the costs. A wooden 'express platform' was built in 1845 alongside the curve that connected the two railways. Although it was alongside the London-bound track, it was also used by trains going towards Exeter. Work also started on the B&ER's independent station in 1845 which was at right angles to the GWR station. It was a simple wooden structure, very different to the GWR's grand terminus, and completed in just six months. It was sometimes referred to as 'The Cow Shed', possibly because of its proximity to the city's cattle market. Unlike the GWR station, it had a refreshment room for passengers.

The Clevedon branch line opened to traffic on 28 July 1847. It was (3 mi 45 ch (5.7 km; 3.56 mi) long and ran Clevedon Road which was now renamed Yatton. The Tiverton branch, which had been authorised at the same time opened on 12 June 1848. It ran from Tiverton Road station which was renamed Tiverton Junction. The branch passed under the Grand Western Canal where Brunel constructed Halberton aqueduct to carry the canal over the railway.

=== LSWR encroaches on B&ER territory ===
The rival London and South Western Railway (LSWR) had its main line from London to Southampton, and was planning to extend through Exeter and into Cornwall. The GWR wished to prevent this by promoting its own lines in the region. At this period Parliament considered that only one line was appropriate to serve any particular area, and naturally each company wished their own allies' lines to be authorised. The LSWR was a 'narrow gauge' railway (later referred to as 'standard gauge') and the GWR and B&ER were 'broad gauge' lines; the intense rivalry to secure territory was often referred to as a 'Gauge War'.

A Wilts, Somerset and Weymouth Railway (WS&WR) was promoted by the GWR in 1845. The GWR now saw it as a way to prevent the LSWR from expanding to Exeter, and as this would harm the position of the B&ER the GWR offered to purchase the B&ER company, which it was leasing. This was put to a B&ER shareholders' meeting and rejected by a considerable majority. (Note: MacDermot (1931), says that the B&ER "shareholders, with an exaggerated notion of the value of their railway, foolishly rejected [the lease terms] by a large majority".) Believing that it had acted in good faith, the GWR now promoted a modified version of the Wilts, Somerset & Weymouth scheme known as the Exeter Great Western, from Yeovil to Exeter via Crewkerne and Axminster. The B&ER felt alienated from the GWR. Brunel saw that his position as Engineer to both companies was compromised, and resigned from the B&ER at the end of September 1846, being succeeded by Charles Hutton Gregory.

Bristol and Exeter Railway (Taunton and Castle Cary Branch) Act 1848
- Act of Parliament
- Parliament of the United Kingdom
- Long title: An Act to enable the Bristol and Exeter Railway Company to make a Branch Railway from the Parish of Lyng, near the Town of Taunton, to join the Wilts, Somerset, and Weymouth Railway near Castle Cary in the County of Somerset.
- Citation: 11 & 12 Vict. c. lxxxii

Dates
- Royal assent: 22 July 1848

Text of statute as originally enacted

The B&ER naturally opposed these schemes, joining with the LSWR in doing so, and in the 1846 parliamentary session they were rejected. The Exeter Great Western proposal was presented again in the 1847 session, and the B&ER again opposed the scheme, itself promoting a branch from Durston (east of Taunton) to Castle Cary (on the WS&WR). The Exeter Great Western scheme was again rejected, but the B&ER Castle Cary line was approved in the Bristol and Exeter Railway (Taunton and Castle Cary Branch) Act 1848 (11 & 12 Vict. c. lxxxii). However, by now the financial collapse following the "Railway Mania" (Note: The "Railway Mania" was a period in which there was a frenzy of promoting railway schemes and investing in them; many of them were bordering on the impractical and some were almost bogus; when it ended, it became impossible to raise finance for railway schemes for some considerable time.) had occurred, and the B&ER never proceeded with that scheme.

The LSWR too had experienced difficulty in making its proposed line to Exeter, and, in continuation of the struggle to exclude the narrow gauge company, the GWR and B&ER jointly promoted a 'Devon and Dorset Railway' to link Dorchester and Exeter in 1852. It would have been built from Maiden Newton on the WS&WR line (which was not yet completed) via Axminster to join the B&ER at Stoke Canon. This line was designed to block the LSWR and tap into local traffic; the journey from London to Exeter would have been ten miles than by the existing line via Bristol. This was presented in parliament in the 1853 session, and became part of a bitter fight for the so-called 'coast line': LSWR trains now reached a terminus at Dorchester and some shareholders in that company proposed its own line. Witnesses for and against the respective lines appeared before the parliamentary committee but the B&ER were absent. The proposed broad gauge line was rejected on 30 June and an LSWR route from Salisbury was built instead, reaching a station at Exeter Queen Street on 19 July 1860.

The LSWR needed to push further west and did this through independent lines that had already been constructed before it had reached Exeter. The Exeter and Crediton Railway Act 1845 (8 & 9 Vict. c. lxxxviii) authorised the Exeter and Crediton Railway (E&CR), a 5 mi 60 ch (9.3 km; 5.75 mi) line from Cowley Bridge, a short distance north of Exeter. Another railway had already been authorised in North Devon: the short 'Taw Vale Railway and Dock' at Barnstaple. Little had been done there until 1845, when the proprietors obtained authorisation in the Taw Vale Railway and Dock Act 1845 (8 & 9 Vict. c. cvii) to revive their powers and build the line; they hoped to sell their enterprise, now called the 'Taw Vale Extension Railway', to another company, the 'North Devon Railway' which was intending to seek an act of parliament for a Barnstaple to Crediton line in 1846.

Meanwhile, competing proposals were submitted to the 1846 session of parliament for railways to connect Barnstaple to the network. The B&ER wished to make a line from their (proposed) Tiverton station, but that was rejected in favour of the Taw Vale Railway Extension and Dock Company, from Barnstaple to join the Exeter and Crediton line at Crediton. This scheme was supported by the LSWR. The Exeter and Crediton line and the North Devon line had been expected to be built on the broad gauge and naturally to fall into the B&ER camp; lease terms had been provisionally agreed. However, the LSWR encouraged friendly relations with the companies. At an E&CR shareholders' meeting on 11 January 1847 the provisional lease to the B&ER was rejected, and this was quickly followed by rejection of the TVER lease; more favourable leases to the LSWR were negotiated and ratified by shareholders in January and February 1847. The B&ER had lost control of the Crediton and Barnstaple lines. J. W. Buller of the B&ER was chairman of the E&CR board, and despite the very large shareholder opinion, he attempted to keep the E&CR within the B&ER family, and personally signed a two-year contract with George Hennett to work the line on 7 April 1847. However at an extraordinary general meeting on 12 April 1847, Buller and three other B&ER directors were removed from office amid angry scenes. The E&CR had been built on the broad gauge and a lease was agreed in February 1851 that the B&ER would work the line and install the junction with their own line at Cowley Bridge at the expense of the E&CR. The E&CR opened on 12 May 1851, for the time being effectively a branch of the B&ER.

The LSWR's Queen Street station was in a more central location than the B&ER station and much at a higher elevation. Earlier thoughts were for an independent line crossing above the B&ER line to reach the Crediton line, but eventually an accommodation with the B&ER was reached. The London and South Western Railway (Exeter and North Devon) Railway Act 1860 (23 & 24 Vict. c. ciii) was obtained for a connecting line descending from Queen Street to St Davids, and the addition of narrow gauge rails to the line from there to Crediton, making that section mixed gauge. The LSWR service started on 1 February 1862.

The B&ER station at Exeter had been built in a one-sided arrangement with separate up and down sections. The increase of traffic and the arrival of LSWR trains made this very difficult to operate; in 1862 work was started on a new conventionally arranged station, and this was opened in July 1864. Taunton station received a corresponding treatment in August 1868. At Weston-super-Mare, the terminus was modernised and expanded, and the branch line doubled, in 1866. At Bristol, the project was much more difficult; work started in March 1871 but was not completed until 1 January 1878, after amalgamation of the B&ER and the GWR; the new station was joint with the Midland Railway.

=== Independence and expansion ===
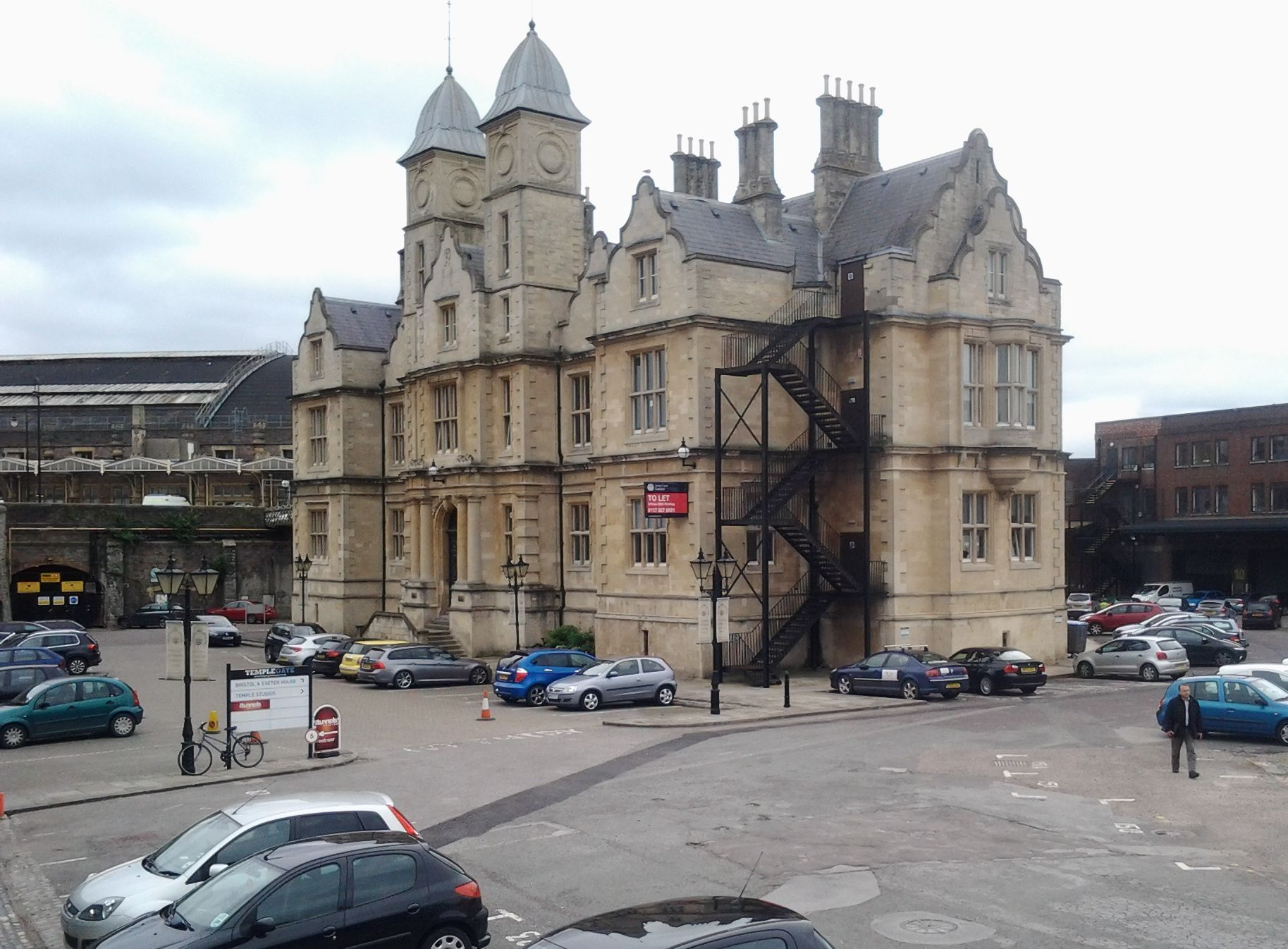
The B&E headquarters building at Temple Meads, Bristol

The lease to the GWR expired "five years after opening to Exeter" and so the B&ER took over the working of its own lines on 1 May 1849, the 75-mile-58-chain (121.9 km; 75.73 mi) main line from Bristol to Exeter and the three branch lines to Clevedon, Weston-super-Mare and Tiverton which totalled 9 mi 63 ch (15.8 km; 9.79 mi). The two companies, B&ER and GWR, were completely distinct and once again there was no common directors, but through trains saw with goods and passenger stock from both companies working onto each other's lines.

Plans for a headquarters building at Bristol in 1852. The contract was awarded to local architect Samuel Fripp and work was completed in October 1854. It was built at road level beside the B&ER station in Jacobean style with three storeys. The lower floor was raised up 10 feet (3.0 m) above ground level with steps up to the door, but the ceiling height was reduced from 18 ft (5.5 m) to 15 ft (4.6 m) so that the first floor would be only slightly above the level of the station's platform. The boardroom at the west end of the first floor had a large Oriel window.

J. B. Badham was appointed as secretary and general superintendent, and after a false start, James Cresswell Wall was appointed Traffic Superintendent, transferring to Chief Goods Agent on 1 January 1855; Henry Dykes succeeded him as Traffic Superintendent. C. H. Gregory remained Chief Engineer until the post was abolished in June 1851. In June 1850 James Pearson took over the locomotive department; at first his workshops were in Exeter, but they were removed to Bristol towards the end of 1851.

The Bristol and Exeter Railway was a considerable financial success, and between 1844 and 1874 paid an average annual dividend of 4.5%. With money now coming in, and in anticipation of independent operation, the company had built a carriage works and coke ovens (Note: Coal was imported from South Wales by ship and converted to coke at Bridgwater as locomotives could not burn coal at this time.) at Bridgwater. George Hennet had arranged to cast pipes at Bridgwater for the atmospheric system on the South Devon Railway, and the Bristol and Exeter Railway built their works next to Hennet's premises. Hennet's works continued to build wagons for the B&ER and other companies until 1878 by which time it was known as the Bridgwater Engineering Company.

The company installed the electric telegraph throughout its main line in 1852. It was the first substantial British railway to operate the block system.

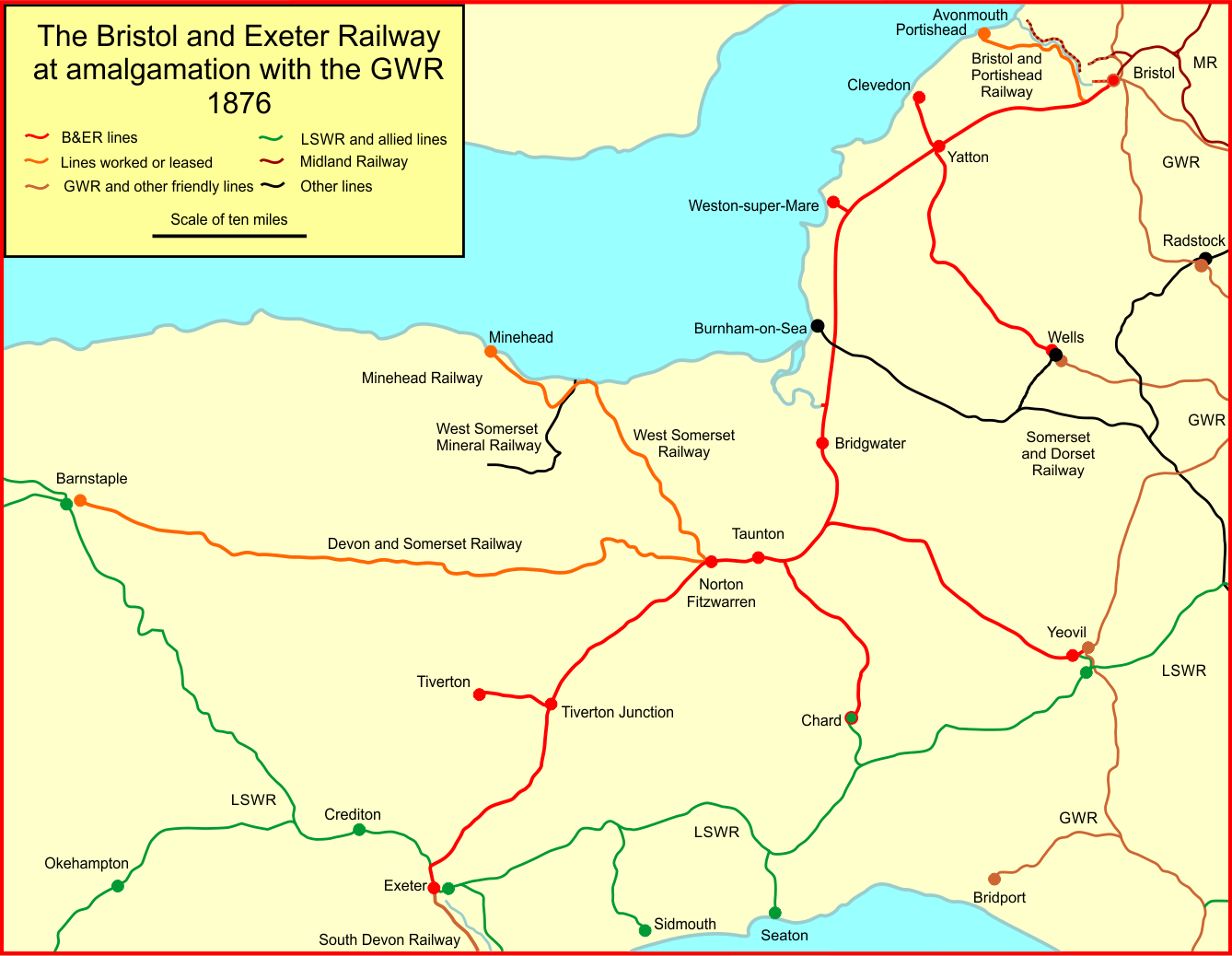
Railways owned or operated by the B&ER in 1875 shown in red. Bristol at top right and Exeter at bottom left.

Had started on the Yeovil branch from Durston in 1847, but due to the new commitment to expenditure on rolling stock, the work was not pressed to completion and opening was delayed by several years. The work was resumed in 1852 and pressed ahead; the whole line to a Yeovil station at Hendford was opened to passengers on 1 October 1853, and to goods on 26 October 1853. With the approach of the Wilts, Somerset and Weymouth line of the GWR, the B&ER branch was extended from Hendford across Yeovil to the GWR station at Pen Mill; this extension opened on 2 February 1857, the same day as the GWR line from Frome to Yeovil. The distance from Durston to Pen Mill was 20 mi 35 ch (32.9 km; 20.44 mi).

The West Somerset Railway was authorised in 1857 to make a 14 mi 48 ch (23.5 km; 14.60 mi) line from the B&ER west of Taunton to Watchet, where there was a small harbour. There were serious difficulties in raising the £140,000 capital but the line finally opened on 31 March 1862 for passengers; goods traffic was handled from August 1862. The line was leased to the B&ER in perpetuity. The West Somerset Railway was extended 8 mi 12 ch (13.1 km; 8.15 mi) to Minehead by the Minehead Railway, opening as a broad gauge single line on 16 July 1874. The two lines were worked as a single branch by the B&ER.

The Somerset Central Railway (SCR) was authorised on 17 June 1852. It was friendly to the B&ER which had subscribed a considerable amount of its capital. It was to build from Highbridge Wharf, crossing the B&ER main line there, and running to Glastonbury, mostly along the route of the Glastonbury Canal which the B&ER had bought and transferred to the SCR as payment for most of the £10,000 shares it purchased in the new company. It was a broad gauge single line 12 mi 38 ch (20.1 km; 12.48 mi) long; when it opened on 28 August 1854 it was leased to the B&ER for a seven-year term. The SCR was extended to Burnham-on-Sea at the west end on 3 May 1858, and to Wells at the east end on 15 March 1859. This made 19 mi 24 ch (31.1 km; 19.30 mi) in total. The lease ran out in 1861 but by then powers had been obtained to extend to Bruton on the GWR's Wilts, Somerset and Weymouth Railway. The Dorset Central Railway, a narrow gauge line that shared directors with the SCR, also obtained powers to join it near Bruton. (Note: The Somerset Central Railway and the Dorset Central Railway merged in August 1862 to form the Somerset and Dorset Railway. The junction with the GWR at Bruton was never completed.) The Somerset Central began operating the line when the B&ER's lease ran out but its new rolling stock was not delivered in time. The B&ER hired some broad gauge stock to them until their narrow gauge stock was available on 3 February 1862. The B&ER also retained powers to run a goods train along the main line and a passenger train to Wells, which it continued to do until 1868.

The Chard and Taunton Railway obtained authorisation in 1861, but was unable to raise the capital needed; the B&ER took over the powers and opened the single line branch to passengers on 11 September 1866, and to goods in March 1867. It was 12 mi 61 ch (20.5 km; 12.76 mi) long from the junction at Creech. The Chard station was joint with the LSWR, who had a branch from their main line at Chard Junction.

The Portishead branch was built by the Bristol and Portishead Pier and Railway Company, and opened on 18 April 1867. The B&ER worked it but it was maintained by the building company. It was a broad gauge single line 9 mi 49 ch (15.5 km; 9.61 mi) long.

The Somerset and Dorset Railway proposed a line from Yatton to Wells in opposing a B&ER scheme for a Wells branch; by negotiation the B&ER took over the Yatton to Wells scheme, and the broad gauge Cheddar Valley Line was opened on 3 August 1869 as far as Cheddar, and extended to a new station at Wells Tucker Street on 5 April 1870 giving a total length of 17 mi 42 ch (28.2 km; 17.53 mi). The new line made a physical connection with the Somerset and Dorset Railway there, but safety concerns led to a prohibition on through passenger working to the GWR line to the south.

The Devon and Somerset Railway obtained authorisation to build from Watchet Junction (later Norton Fitzwarren) to Barnstaple in 1864. The company found great difficulty in raising the necessary finance, but opened to Wiveliscombe on 8 June 1871, and throughout on 1 November 1873. The 42 mi 50 ch (68.6 km; 42.63 mi) line was broad gauge and single, with heavy gradients. It was worked by the B&ER for half the gross receipts.

There were also three short branches to connect the B&ER with docks. The first was a short horse tramway laid by Bridgwater Corporation in 1845 to connect the railway station and the town's East Quay. It was taken over by the B&ER in 1859, modified for locomotive working in 1867 and extended to the dock on the west side of the river River Parrett in 1871. A little further downstream on the Parrett is Dunball Wharf which linked to Dunball railway station by a private hore tramway in 1844. The B&ER extended the wharf and made a new branch to it in 1869. The B&ER and GWR opened the short Bristol Harbour Railway from Temple Meads to the Floating Harbour in Bristol on 11 March 1872. The Corporation of Bristol also made alterations at the harbour to accommodate the railway.

=== Narrowing the gauge ===
Apart from the short LSWR running sections at Exeter and Yeovil, the B&ER had been exclusively broad gauge. Then in 1866, the Somerset and Dorset Railway (S&DR) proposed building a Bridgwater branch from their line. To head this encroachment off, the B&ER undertook to lay narrow gauge rails on their own line from Highbridge, where the S&DR joined it, to Bridgwater quay, and from there to Yeovil via Durston (where trains reversed). Narrow gauge passenger and goods rolling stock was acquired, and with the track works the scheme cost £125,000. A daily B&ER narrow gauge goods train ran from November 1867, and after resolution of authorisation difficulties with the London and South Western Railway (LSWR), some narrow gauge passenger trains ran from Yeovil Pen Mill to Durston, with some extensions to Highbridge. However, the volume of traffic was very disappointing, and five of the eight locomotives purchased for the workings were converted to broad gauge by 1871.

If the broad gauge had originally been an asset, by the 1870s was it was clear that the narrow gauge of 4 ft 8 1/2 in (1,435 mm) had become the standard gauge, and beyond the Great Western Railway the vast majority of lines adopted it. As trade increased this led to difficulties at the point of junction between lines, a break of gauge where goods had to be physically transhipped between wagons for onward transit. In July 1874, the Somerset and Dorset Railway completed its Bath extension, and narrow gauge wagons could reach Exeter and beyond from the Midlands over that route and the LSWR.

Bristol and Exeter Railway Act 1875
- Act of Parliament
- Parliament of the United Kingdom
- Long title: An Act to enable the Bristol and Exeter Railway Company to make a new line to Weston-super-Mare; to transfer to that Company the powers of the Exe Valley Railway Company, and to confer further powers upon the Company with respect to their Undertaking and the Undertakings of the Exe Valley and Culm Valley Railway Companies; and for other purposes.
- Citation: 38 & 39 Vict. c. cxxvii

Dates
- Royal assent: 19 July 1875

Text of statute as originally enacted

Responding to the situation, the B&ER started to lay narrow gauge rails on its main line making it a mixed gauge. In February 1875, the shareholders were informed that the company was undertaking the installation throughout the main line; this would involve a considerable investment in rolling stock. That year, the Bristol and Exeter Railway Act 1875 (38 & 39 Vict. c. cxxvii) was obtained authorising this work and the raising of capital to pay for it; and to substitute a loop line at Weston-super-Mare for the branch line.

Mixed gauge was installed from Bristol to Taunton by 1 June 1875, enabling the heavy goods and livestock traffic to be accommodated in narrow gauge trains, and the Weston-super-Mare branch had already been dealt with. The line on to Exeter was completed in November 1875. The Cheddar Valley line from Yatton to Wells was converted to standard gauge (as opposed to 'mixed') by 18 November 1875. Plans were in hand to deal with the rest of the system.

=== Amalgamation and after ===
Great Western and Bristol and Exeter Railway Companies Amalgamation Act 1876
- Act of Parliament
- Parliament of the United Kingdom
- Long title: An Act to amalgamate the Undertakings of the Great Western and Bristol and Exeter Railway Companies; and for other Purposes.
- Citation: 39 & 40 Vict. c. lxxiv

Dates
- Royal assent: 27 June 1876

Text of statute as originally enacted

During this expensive upheaval, the directors quickly determined that amalgamation with another company with greater financial resources, was needed. The Midland Railway was considered, but meaningful negotiation started with the neighbouring Great Western Railway. The talks were quickly finalised, and a lease to the GWR from 1 January 1876 was ratified by special shareholders' meetings. The GWR was to pay 6% on ordinary share capital. Actual amalgamation took place on 1 August 1876 under the Great Western and Bristol and Exeter Railway Companies Amalgamation Act 1876 (39 & 40 Vict. c. lxxiv), the combined company being called the Great Western Railway.

Under GWR ownership, the train service pattern continued with some variations. However, towards the end of the 19th century it became increasingly clear that the route form London to Exeter via Bristol was inconvenient, and steps were taken to provide a shorter route. This was built in stages, but on 20 May 1906 the new route was opened, running via Newbury and Castle Cary, joining the old B&ER line at Cogload Junction, east of Taunton. The original route section between Bristol and Cogload Junction was diminished in importance as most through trains were diverted to the new route, which was 19 mi 74 ch (32.1 km; 19.93 mi) shorter.

The 1906 junction at Cogload was conventional, but increasing traffic led to delays. Under the Development (Loan Guarantees and Grants) Act 1929 (20 & 21 Geo. 5. c. 7), the GWR received government financial assistance to carry out improvement works, and the opportunity was taken to provide a grade-separated junction at Cogload; the Down Bristol line was carried over the Castle Cary lines on a truss bridge. Other improvements to stations and layout enhancements were carried out between Taunton and Exeter, including quadrupling of the line between Taunton and Norton Fitzwarren and considerable enlargement of both stations, and provision of goods bypass lines and an enlarged engine shed at Taunton. These improvements were commissioned progressively between 1931 and 1933.

== Train services ==
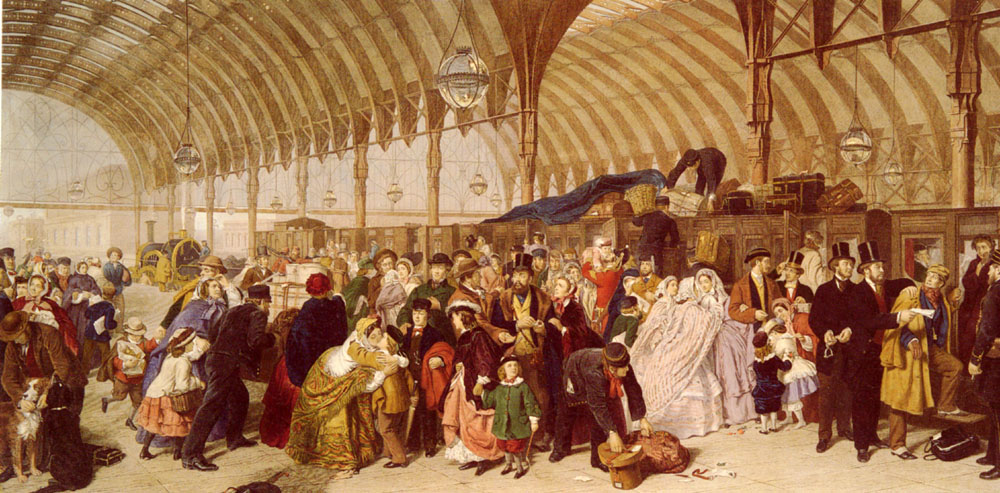
William Powell Frith's painting of The Railway Station depicts the scene at London Paddington as a West of England express is prepared. The train includes a B&ER luggage van next to the locomotive.

The express trains on the main line generally ran through from London Paddington and the GWR, and continued westward along the South Devon line to Torquay, Plymouth Millbay or Penzance. Despite the claimed superiority of the broad gauge, train speeds were not much better than on the standard gauge. Lord Dalhousie was charged by Parliament to form a committee to comment on the gauge question, and the committee's report in January 1845 stated, The actual speed of trains on the Great Western Railway, [implying broad gauge lines in general] as shown by the published time-tables and by official returns, is not so high as upon some narrow gauge railways. This spurred the GWR and B&ER immediately to accelerate the best train to Exeter, which would complete the 194 miles (312 km) in five hours. This was soon further accelerated to four and a half hours, but the B&ER added two stops—at Weston Junction and Tiverton Junction—in May 1849, slowing the down train by 15 minutes. The B&ER section was run from Bristol Express Platform to Exeter (87 miles (140 km) in an hour and 45 minutes in 1846 and two hours in 1849.

Ticket platforms, which added an additional stop, existed outside Bristol and Exeter, and from 1870 on either side of Taunton. The relatively slow speed of the best trains was not considered a problem until the LSWR put on a train on their line that was 25 minutes faster to Exeter, and from 1 March 1862 a 4 1/2-hour train was put on; at Bristol the down train backed into the B&ER terminus for the station call. These trains were "far and away the fastest in the world". However, in the succeeding years the timings were slowed once again. In 1871, the service was again accelerated to 94 minutes Bristol to Exeter. Thus the Bristol and Exeter Railway shared with the Great Western the distinction of running the fastest trains in the world. Ordinary trains took three or four hours.

Cheap excursions in the summer were popular: for 1s 6d excursionists could go from Bristol to Weston and back, and for 1s from Bristol to Cheddar or from Taunton to Watchet. Excursion platforms were set up at Bedminster, Weston and Clevedon, apparently to segregate the excursionists from ordinary passengers.

The 1850 Bradshaw shows six down and seven up (Note: Down trains were from the London and Bristol direction, and up trains were towards London.) passenger trains; all called at all stations except two trains each way, which were probably through trains from and to London. Although the best journey time Bristol to Exeter (78 miles (126 km) was two hours, most trains required up to 3 1/2 hours; it may be that these trains were mixed and time was spent at stations shunting goods wagons.

The shorter branch lines generally operated with a single locomotive although some had through trians from Bristol. The Somerset Central Railway saw six trains on weekdays and two on Sundays when it opened in 1854. The extension to Burnham-on-Sea was operated separately with a short train from the junction at Highbridge.

There were some small changes when the GWR took over in 1876. The new mixed gauge on the main line allowed local trains to be operated by narrow gauge stock. A new express passenger train was put on between London and Plymouth in 1877 named the Zulu, suuplementing the existing Flying Dutchman. Further new broad gauge expresses to and from London were the Jubilee from July 1887 and The Cornishman from June 1890. The gauge conversion west of Exeter in 1892 enabled through carriages from Manchester, Liverpool and Leeds to reach South Devona nd Cornwall. The biggest change came in 1906 when the Castle Cary cut-off opened a shorter route between Taunton and London which avoided the 'Great Way Round' through Bristol.

== B&ER remains today ==
The Bristol–Exeter line remains in use, along with the Weston-super-Mare loop which replaced the original branch line in 1884.

The Exeter and Crediton line, lost to the B&ER early on, also remains open as part of a rural branch line; passenger services are operated under the brand name Tarka Line.

The line formed by the West Somerset Railway and the Minehead Railway closed, but reopened as a heritage railway, also using the name the West Somerset Railway.

== Description of the main line ==
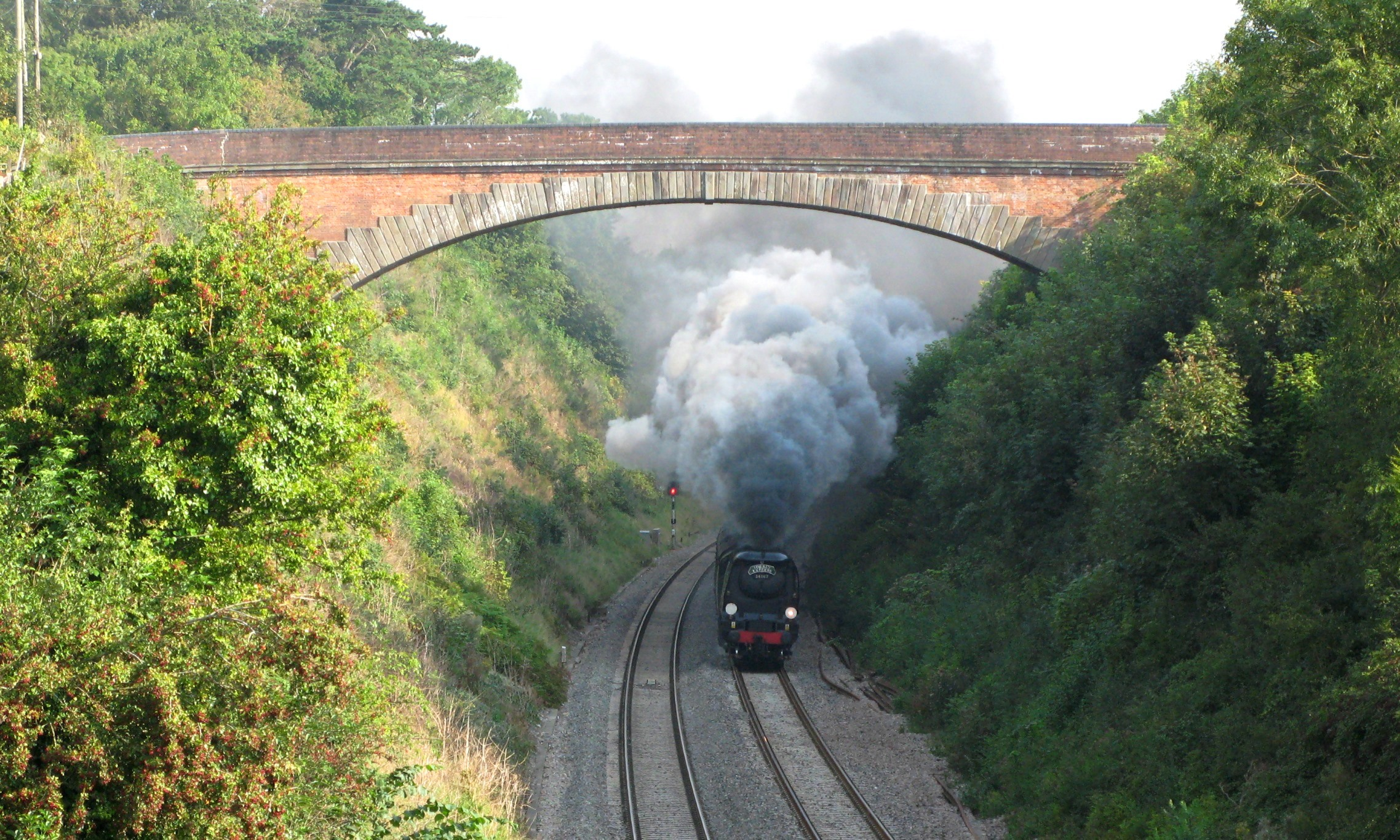
Devil's Bridge, Uphill

William Gravatt was resident engineer for the construction between Bristol and White Ball (near Wellington, Somerset; usually spelt Whiteball in railway publications). William Froude supervised the section from there to Exeter.

After leaving Bristol, the main line was laid on easy curves and gradients as far as Taunton; there is a slight summit at Flax Bourton cutting the line is generally level, in part traversing the Somerset Levels, running north-west of the Mendip Hills and south-east of the Quantock Hills. From Taunton the gradients are more difficult, with some sharper curvature. The line crosses the flank of the Blackdown Hills. There is a summit at Whiteball, approached by a ten-mile (16 km) climb from Taunton, stiffening to typically 1 in 80 in the final three miles (4.8 km). In the up direction, the climb is practically continuous from Exeter to Whiteball, on moderate gradients as far as Cullompton, then stiffening to 1 in 155 with a final 2 miles (3.2 km) at 1 in 115.

South of Weston-super-Mare the line crosses the western end of the Mendip Hills, at Uphill, through a deep cutting spanned by a 115 feet (35 m) masonry arch bridge, known locally as Devil's Bridge, which is built into the rock sides. It crosses Bleadon Hill cutting and was "the best and tallest example of this kind of structure". It is a Listed Building grade II. The line then runs south across the Somerset Levels.

At Bridgwater, a retractable or Telescopic Bridge was built in 1871 to the design of Sir Francis Fox. It carried a short industrial branch line over the River Parrett to the docks, but the bridge had to be movable, to allow boats to proceed upriver. An 80-foot (24 m) section of railway track to the east of the bridge could be moved sideways, so that the main 127-foot (39 m) girders could be retracted, creating a navigable channel which was 78 feet (24 m) wide. It was manually operated for the first eight months, and then powered by a steam engine, reverting to manual operation in 1913, when the steam engine failed. The bridge was last opened in 1953, and the traverser section was demolished in 1974, but public outcry at the action resulted in the bridge being listed as a Scheduled Ancient Monument, and the rest of the bridge was kept. It was later used as a road crossing, until the construction of the Chandos road bridge alongside it, and is now only used by pedestrians. Parts of the steam engine were moved to Westonzoyland Pumping Station Museum in 1977. The bridge is now a Grade II* listed building.

The main line crossed the River Parrett just south of Bridgwater by the Somerset Bridge, with a 100 feet (30 m) span but a rise of 12 feet (3.7 m), half that of the Maidenhead bridge. Work started in 1838 and was completed in 1841. Brunel left the centring in place as the foundations were still settling, but in 1843 complaints that navigation was being interfered with had to be responded to. He said that "although the Arch itself is still perfect, the movement of the foundations has continued ... and the centres have, in consequence, been kept in place. [As instructed] by the Directors, measures are being adopted to enable us to remove these centres immediately, at the sacrifice of the present arch."

Brunel demolished the brick arch and replaced it with a timber arch, which was in turn replaced in 1904 by a steel girder bridge.

At Taunton the River Tone was straightened to avoid the need for two bridges close together. West of Taunton gradients of 1 in 80 were needed to cross the Blackdown Hills and at the summit on the Somerset-Devon border the 1,092 yards (999 m) Whiteball Tunnel was constructed.

William Froude, resident engineer for the western section of the main line, developed an empirical method of setting out track transition curves and introduced an alternative design to the helicoidal skew arch bridge at Rewe and Cowley Bridge Junction, near Exeter. (Note: Brick and masonry arches constructed on heavy skews had been built with the course joints parallel to the abutments. Froude's system was to lay the arch rings on a helix so that the line of thrust was normal to the courses; this avoided primary shear forces in the joints but required more skilled workmanship.)

== Locomotives ==
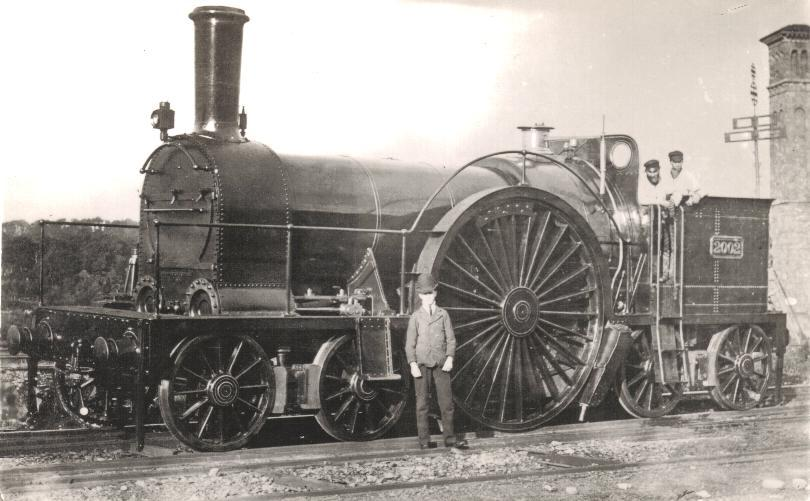
Pearson 4-2-4T at Exeter in 1876

Locomotives for the railway were initially provided by the Great Western Railway. Engine sheds were sited at major stations and on some branches. To enable the Bristol and Exeter to work its own trains from 1 May 1849, 28 locomotives were built to designs by Daniel Gooch: twenty 4-2-2s for passenger services and eight 0-6-0s for goods trains.

Charles Hutton Gregory was responsible for the locomotives until May 1850, when James Pearson was appointed as Locomotive Engineer. He designed several classes of tank engines, including his distinctive large 4-2-4T locomotives, the first of which were introduced in 1854. Workshops were established at Bristol in September 1854 and the company built some of its own locomotives there.

Some standard gauge locomotives were necessary from 1867 as lines were converted from broad gauge. The company also owned two 3 ft (91 cm)-gauge locomotives that worked in the railway's quarry at Burlescombe. The stock had expanded to 125 locomotives by 1875:

Locomotives transferred to GWR in 1876
Type	Broad gauge	Standard gauge	3 ft gauge
0-6-0	30	16	0
2-4-0	13	3	0
4-2-2	8	0	0
4-4-0T	26	0	0
4-2-4T	6	0	0
0-6-0T	5	2	0
2-4-2T	0	2	0
2-2-2T	4	0	0
2-4-2T	0	2	0
0-4-0T	3	3	2
Total	95	28	2

== See also ==
- Bristol–Exeter line – for the later history and current operations of the main line
- The Great Western Mail Robbery (1849)
