= Mendip Vale railway station =

Railway station in Doulting, Somerset, England

Mendip Vale
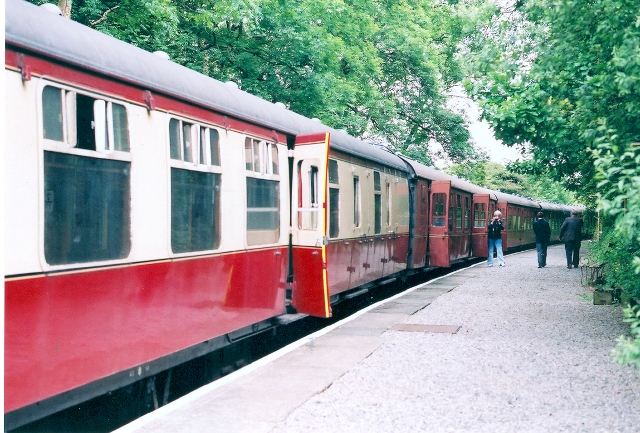

General information
- Location: Doulting, Somerset; England
- Coordinates: 51.180°N 2.520°W
- Grid reference: ST637424
- System: Station on heritage railway
- Operator: East Somerset Railway
- Platforms: 1
Location

Mendip Vale is the western terminus of the East Somerset Railway.

== Services ==
All trains terminate at Mendip Vale, with a 5-10 minute wait while the engine runs round to change ends.

== Facilities ==
Visitors are encouraged to leave the train and watch the engine run round. A footpath has been constructed between the platform and Maesdown Road, to allow public access to the station.

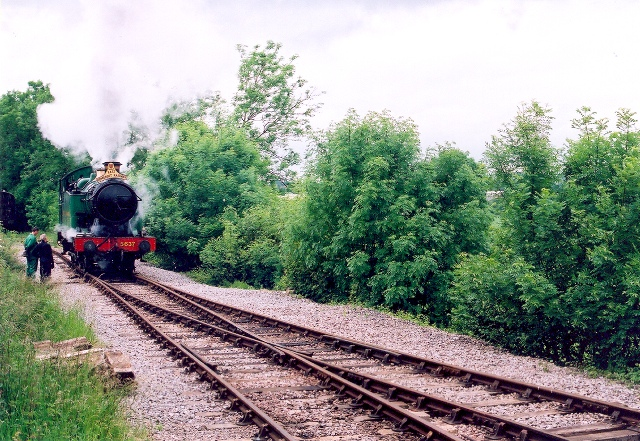
Mendip Vale the nearest station to the city of Wells which is cut off from the rest of the UK by the Beeching Axe.

Preceding station	Heritage railways	Following station
Terminus	East Somerset Railway	Merryfield Lane towards Cranmore
