= East Somerset Railway =

Former railway company and heritage railway

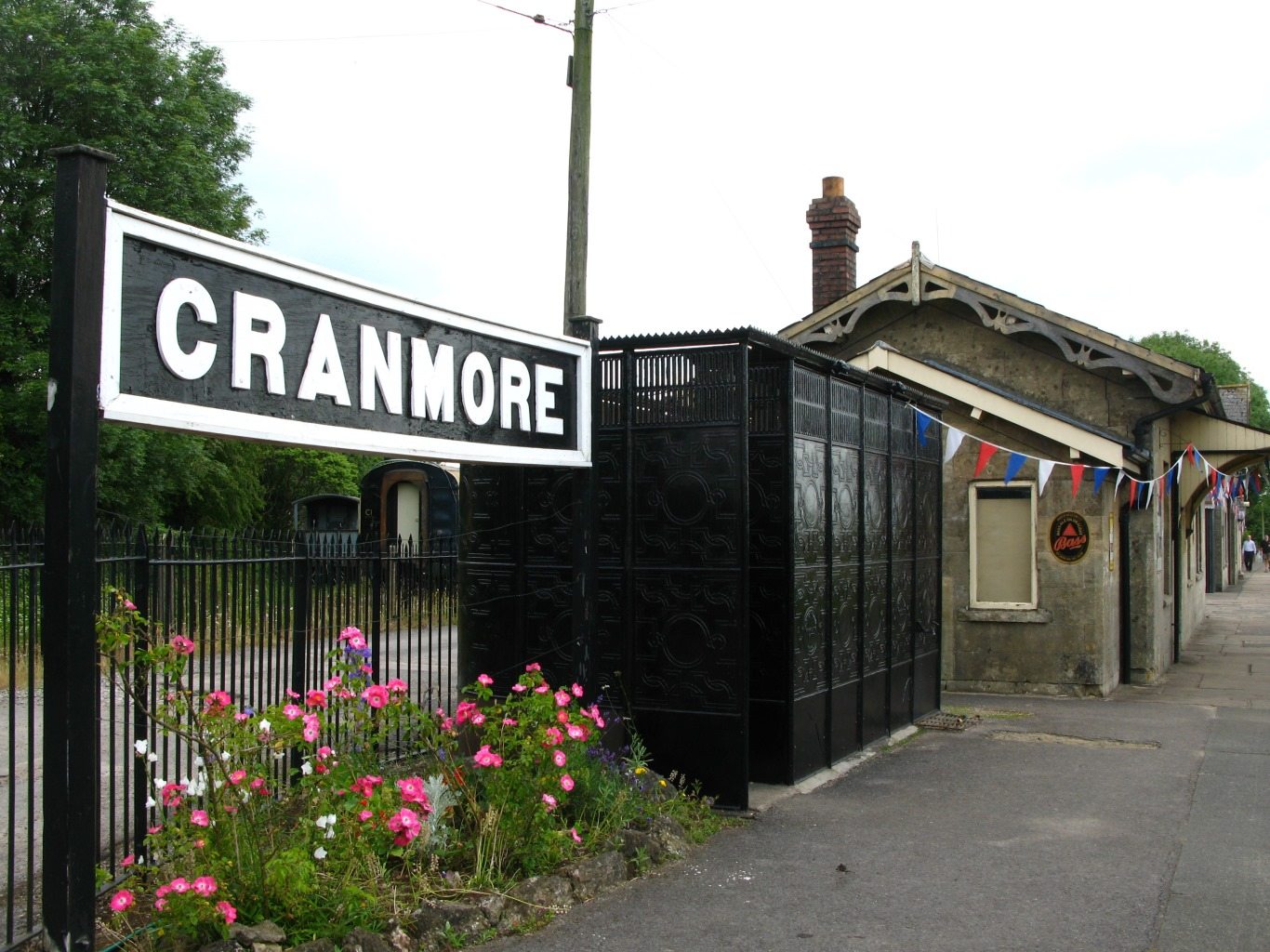
- Cranmore railway station is the line's headquarters
- Locale: Somerset

Commercial operations
- Original gauge: 7 ft 1/4 in (2,140 mm) Brunel gauge

Preserved operations
- Length: 1 mi 63 ch (2.9 km)
- Preserved gauge: 4 ft 8 1/2 in (1,435 mm) standard gauge

Commercial history
- Opened: 9 November 1858
- 1 March 1862: Extension opened
- 1874: Converted to 4 ft 8 1/2 in (1,435 mm) standard gauge
- Closed to passengers: 1963
- Closed: 1985

Preservation history
- 1972: Restoration (of the ESR) begins
- 1974: ESR granted light railway order
- 1975: ESR re-opened
- 1981: ESR extended to Merryfield halt
- 1985: ESR extended into Mendip Vale
- Headquarters: Cranmore

East Somerset Railway shown within Somerset
(grid reference ST665435)

The East Somerset Railway is a 1 mi 63 ch (2.9 km) heritage railway in Somerset, running between Cranmore and Mendip Vale. The railway was once part of the former Cheddar Valley line that ran from Witham to Yatton, meeting the Somerset and Dorset Joint Railway at Wells but was considered for closure even before the publication of 'The Reshaping of British Railways' by Dr Richard Beeching in March 1963.

== History ==
East Somerset Railway Act 1856
- Act of Parliament
- Parliament of the United Kingdom
- Long title: An Act for making a Railway from the Wilts, Somerset, and Weymouth Railway, near Frome, to Shepton Mallett in the County of Somerset.
- Citation: 19 & 20 Vict. c. xvi

Dates
- Royal assent: 5 June 1856

Text of statute as originally enacted

East Somerset Railway (Extension to Wells) Act 1857
- Act of Parliament
- Parliament of the United Kingdom
- Long title: An Act to authorize the East Somerset Railway Company to extend their Railway from Shepton Mallett to Wells.
- Citation: 20 & 21 Vict. c. cv

Dates
- Royal assent: 27 July 1857

Text of statute as originally enacted

East Somerset Railway Act 1860
- Act of Parliament
- Parliament of the United Kingdom
- Long title: An Act for authorizing the East Somerset Railway Company to abandon the making of their authorized Railway from Shepton Mallett to Wells, and to make instead thereof another Railway from Shepton Mallett to Wells; and for other Purposes.
- Citation: 23 & 24 Vict. c. lxxiii

Dates
- Royal assent: 14 June 1860

Text of statute as originally enacted

The East Somerset Railway Company was incorporated under the East Somerset Railway Act 1856 (19 & 20 Vict. c. xvi) on 5 June 1856 and was built as a 7 ft 1/4 in (2,140 mm) broad gauge line. The line was originally between Witham railway station and Shepton Mallet and this line opened on 9 November 1858. It was planned by Mr. Brunel and built by engineer Mr. Ward and contractor Mr. Brotherwood. The station buildings at Shepton and Witham Friary, as well as the bridges along the route, were constructed of Inferior Oolite from nearby Doulting Stone Quarry. Shepton was now 129 miles (208 km) from London by rail, a journey of just over four hours.

Four years later the line was extended to Wells. This part of the line was opened on 1 March 1862 and made it 13 mi 65 ch (22.2 km) long. The East Somerset Railway was bought by the Great Western Railway on 2 December 1874, shortly after it was converted to 4 ft 8 1/2 in (1,435 mm) standard gauge.

In 1878, the Great Western Railway (GWR) joined the East Somerset line with the Cheddar Valley line to Wells, which had been built by the Bristol and Exeter Railway, by obtaining running rights over a section of the Somerset and Dorset Joint Railway (S&DJR) and running its trains through the S&DJR Wells station at Priory Road, though GWR trains did not stop at Priory Road until 1934. At this stage, the main traffic became the through trains from Yatton to Witham and the East Somerset Railway station in Wells closed, with Wells (Tucker Street) becoming the station for the city on the line. The Yatton to Witham service remained in use with the GWR and later British Railways until passenger service finally ceased on 7 September 1963, however trains carrying bitumen continued until 1985.

== Preservation ==
In 1971/72, the artist David Shepherd came across, viewed and later purchased Cranmore station and a section of the track to house and run his two locomotives; the British Rail (BR) 2-10-0 Class 9F No. 92203 "Black Prince" and BR Standard 4 4-6-0 No. 75029 'The Green Knight'. In 1973, the line opened offering Brake Van rides before extending first to Merryfield Lane in 1980 (operating from Cranmore West), then to Mendip Vale and finally into Cranmore station itself in 1985.

The East Somerset Railway (ESR) only operates the line between Cranmore, Cranmore West, Merryfield Lane Halt and Mendip Vale. Between the last two sections, the railway runs through the Doulting Railway Cutting Site of Special Scientific Interest. The section between Cranmore and the mainline is used for heavy quarry traffic to the nearby Merehead Quarry.

In 1991, a new station building was constructed at Cranmore which now includes a cafe, booking office, gift shop and toilets. The platform then extends to the old station which is now a museum. On the platform is an old K4 red telephone box which incorporates a stamp machine and post box. It was made around 1927 and is one of only 50 made to that design. Opposite the platform is a signal box dating from 1904 and is the standard GWR pattern of the period. Close to Cranmore station are the engine sheds and workshop (known together as Cranmore Shed) which were built in 1973, (during the preserved line's restoration at the time).

Cranmore Traincare and Maintenance and Services (CTMS) was set up in 1995 at the Cranmore base of the ESR. They carry out professional repairs to carriages and bodywork overhauls on diesel locomotives. CTMS is based opposite the ESR loco workshop in a separate preservation era shed.

The East Somerset Railway Order 2005 (SI 2005/3143) allowed a further 660 yards (600 metres) of track to be used.

On 25 March 2007, the East Somerset Railway announced that it had received a £7,500 grant from Shepton 21 Group, a local organisation, set up to regenerate the area around Shepton Mallet. The money was to be spent on conducting a feasibility study into extending the line towards Shepton Mallet, with a possible new terminus at Cannards Grave, on the outskirts of Shepton Mallet.

== Locomotives ==
=== Operational steam locomotives ===
Number & name	Type	Wheels	Built	To ESR	Notes	Image
46447	LMS Ivatt Class 2	2-6-0	1950	2012	One of 128 similar locomotives, 46447 was built by British Railways at Crewe in 1950 to a London Midland and Scottish Railway (LMS) design. Its first allocation was to Crewe North shed. After withdrawal in 1966, it was sold for scrap to the Woodham Brothers but was sold by them for preservation in 1972. Some restoration was done at the Buckinghamshire Railway Centre and the Isle of Wight Steam Railway but this was completed at Cranmore and it worked its first train on 26 October 2014.	46447 in front of Cranmore MPD
4110	GWR 5101	2-6-2T	1936	2020	4110 was built in 1936 at Swindon Works. It was rescued from Woodham Brothers scrapyard in Barry in 1979 by the Great Western Preservation Group and moved to Southall Railway Centre. It later moved to Tyseley Locomotive Works then the West Somerset Railway for restoration but this was not completed. The locomotive was purchased by the Dartmouth Steam Railway in 2019 and arrived at Cranmore on 10 January 2020. Once restoration is completed it will run at the East Somerset Railway for three years.	
Lady Nan	Andrew Barclay Sons & Co.	0-4-0ST	1920	1975	This locomotive was built by Andrew Barclay in 1920 and given their works number 1719. It worked for several owners and was known at different times as 'Hurlford Fireclay Works No. 2' and 'Glenfield No. 2'. It was sold for scrap in 1972 but was instead preserved, reaching the East Somerset Railway on 5 November 1975. It was named Lady Nan after one of its owners in 1985. It was loaned to the National Railway Museum for a while but returned to Cranmore in 2000. It is painted in a blue livery.	

Former resident locomotives include 56xx 5637, 9F 92203 "Black Prince", Standard 4MT 4-6-0 75029 The Green Knight, Standard 4MT 2-6-0 76017, GWR Castle 5029 Nunney Castle, SR Westcountry 34027 'Taw Valley', SR West Country 34105 Swanage, SR S15 828, GWR Manor 7822 Foxcote Manor, GWR 14xx 1450, LBSCR E1 110, LMS 3F 47493, NER J72 69023 'Joem' and GNR J52 68846.

=== Steam locomotives under overhaul ===
Number & name	Class	Wheel arrangement	Built	To ESR	Notes	Image
31 Meteor	RSH	0-6-0T	1950	?		
4247	GWR 5205	2-8-0T	1916	2021		

=== Diesel traction ===
The ESR is host to a Class 108 DMU as well as a fleet of Sentinel shunting locomotives, these are listed below:

Number & name	Type	Built	To ESR	Notes	Image
L231 (51909 & 56271)	Class 108	1960	2013	A two-car diesel multiple unit, it was withdrawn in 1993 and put into storage before moving to Midsomer Norton in 2011 and then moving to Cranmore two years later and has been restored in British Rail blue livery. Car 51909 is a Driving Motor Brake Second; 56271 is a Driving Trailer Composite Lavatory. It is owned by The Mendip Traction & Rolling Stock Group.	
DH16	0-4-0DH; CD Sentinel	1964	2015	Built for the Manchester Ship Canal in 1964 (works number 10175), later working at the Bowaters Paper Mill in Ellesmere Port. It was donated to the East Lancashire Railway in 1981. It was sold in 1999 and moved to Merehead for restoration in Manchester Ship Canal livery before finding a home on the West Somerset Railway where it was based from 2001 until 2015. Owned by the Sentinel Diesel Preservation Group (SDPG).	
39	0-6-0DH; SR Sentinel	1965	1999	Built in 1965, works number 10218 operated for the Port of Bristol Authority (PBA) as their number 39. It was preserved on the Dean Forest Railway in 1984 and arrived at Cranmore in 1999. It is privately owned and painted in PBA Oxford blue livery.	
42 Eric	0-6-0DH; SR Sentinel	1965	2007	Built in 1965, works number 10221 operated for the Port of Bristol Authority as their number 42. It was redundant in 1983 and later worked at the Rover car factory at Longbridge in Birmingham, and for Blue Circle Cement in Westbury, Wiltshire where it was given the name Eric and later donated to the SDPG to be restored for preservation.	
199	0-4-0DH; CD Sentinel	1964	2007	Built for Esso Petroleum in 1964 (works number 10199), this shunter worked in Glasgow until it was moved to Cattedown Wharf in Plymouth in 1995. It was gifted to the SDPG in 2007 and named Cattewater once it was restored but the name has since been removed.	
Joan	0-4-0DH; SR Sentinel	1963	2005	Built by Rolls-Royce (works number 10165) as a demonstration locomotive in 1963, it was sold to the Oxfordshire Ironstone Company in 1964 and given the name Jane from the steam locomotive it replaced. It later worked for Stewarts & LLoyds and the British Steel Corporation. It was withdrawn in 1989 and initially preserved on the Dean Forest Railway. It arrived at Cranmore in 2005 for restoration which was completed in 2017 and once again carries the Oxfordshire Ironstone Company's maroon livery. Owned by the SDPG.	

== Features ==
The distance from Cranmore to Mendip Vale is 1 mile 63 chains (2.9 km).

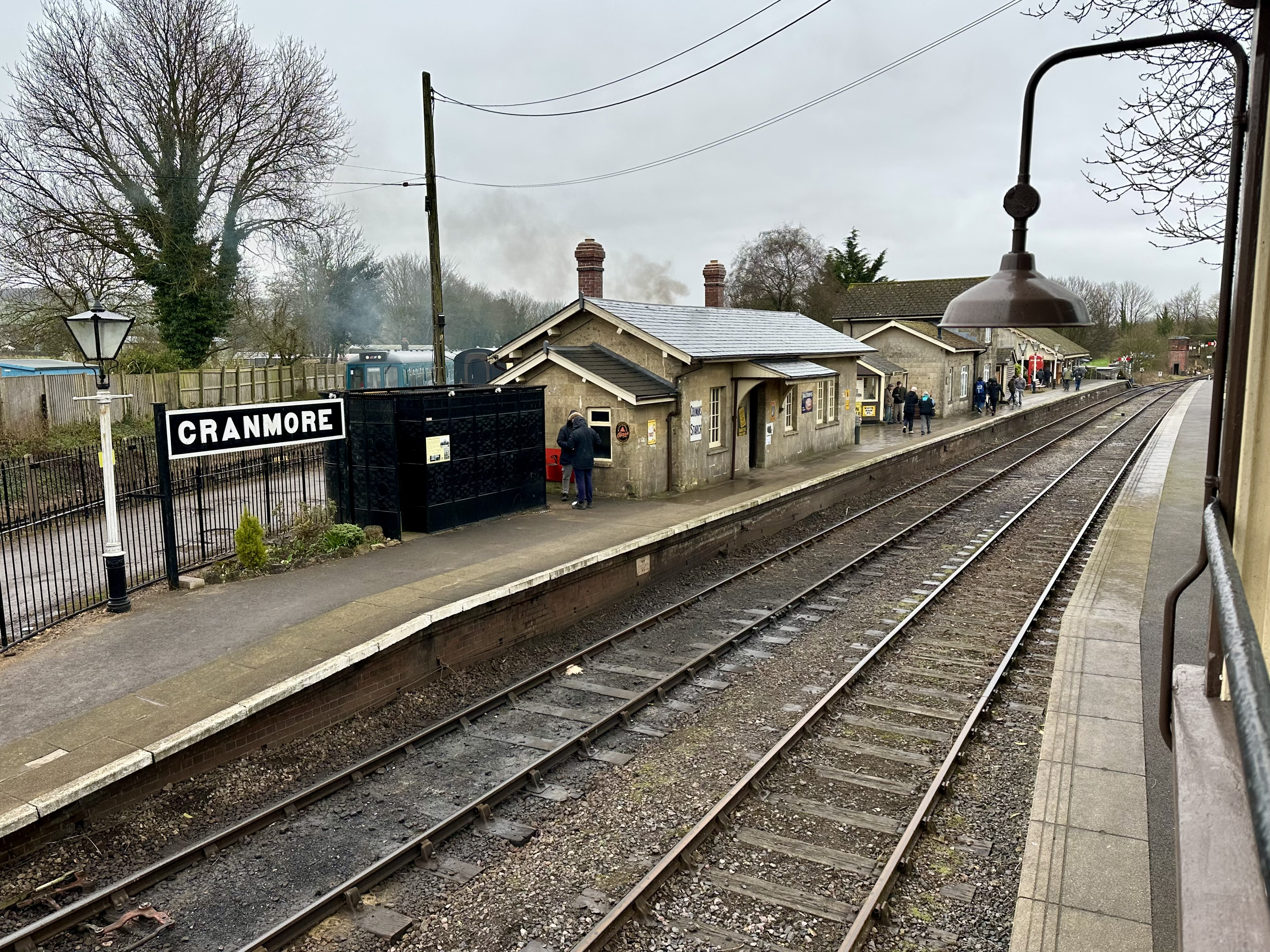
Cranmore station in 2024

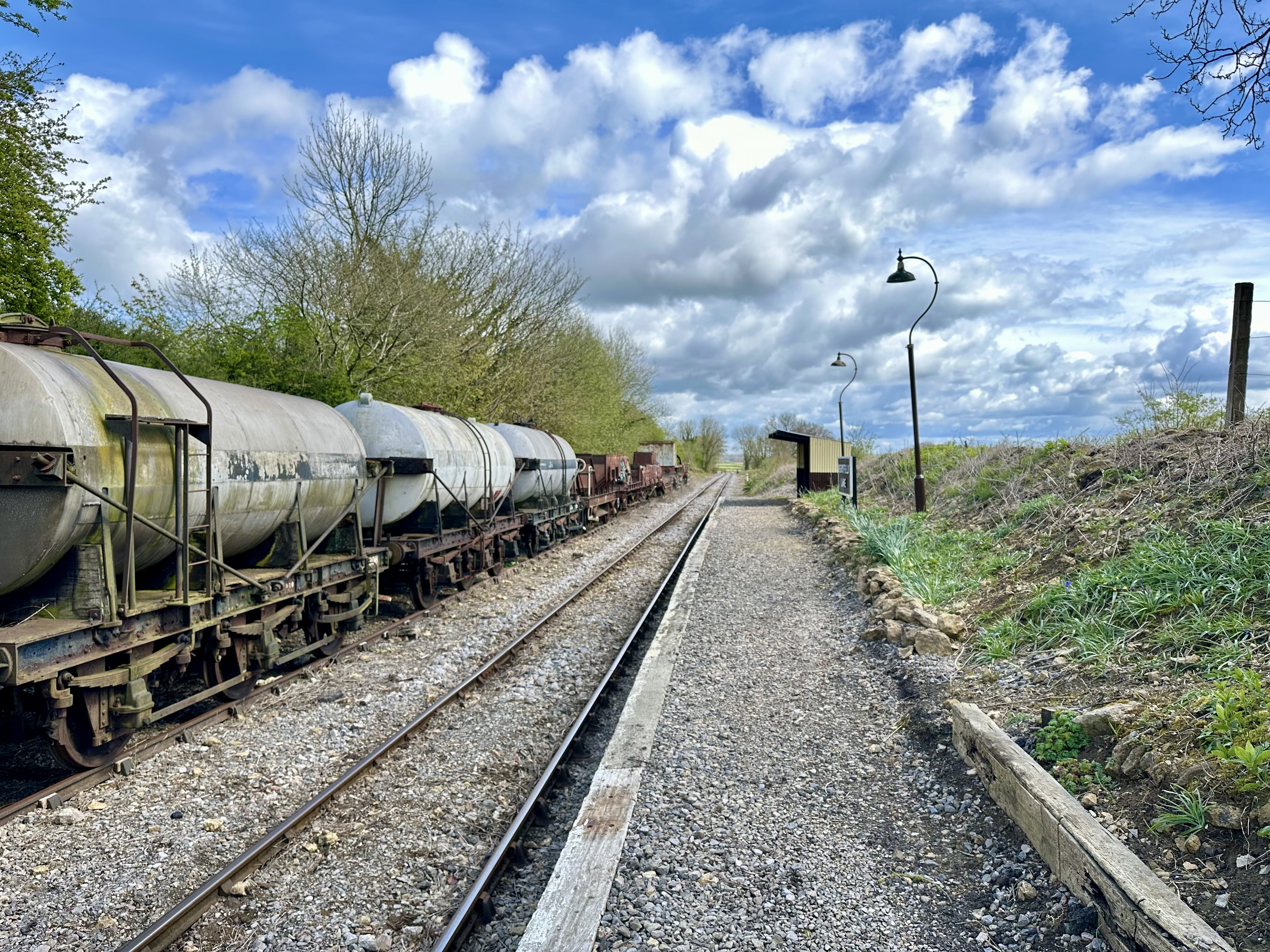
Merryfield Lane station in 2024

Point	Coordinates (links to map & photo sources)	Notes
Cranmore railway station	51.185°N 2.478°W	Eastern start of railway line
Cranmore West railway station	51.184°N 2.483°W	
Merryfield Lane railway station	51.181°N 2.498°W	
Mendip Vale railway station	51.180°N 2.520°W	Western terminus
