= Glastonbury and Street railway station =

Former railway station

Coordinates: 51.1479°N 2.7295°W

Glastonbury and Street
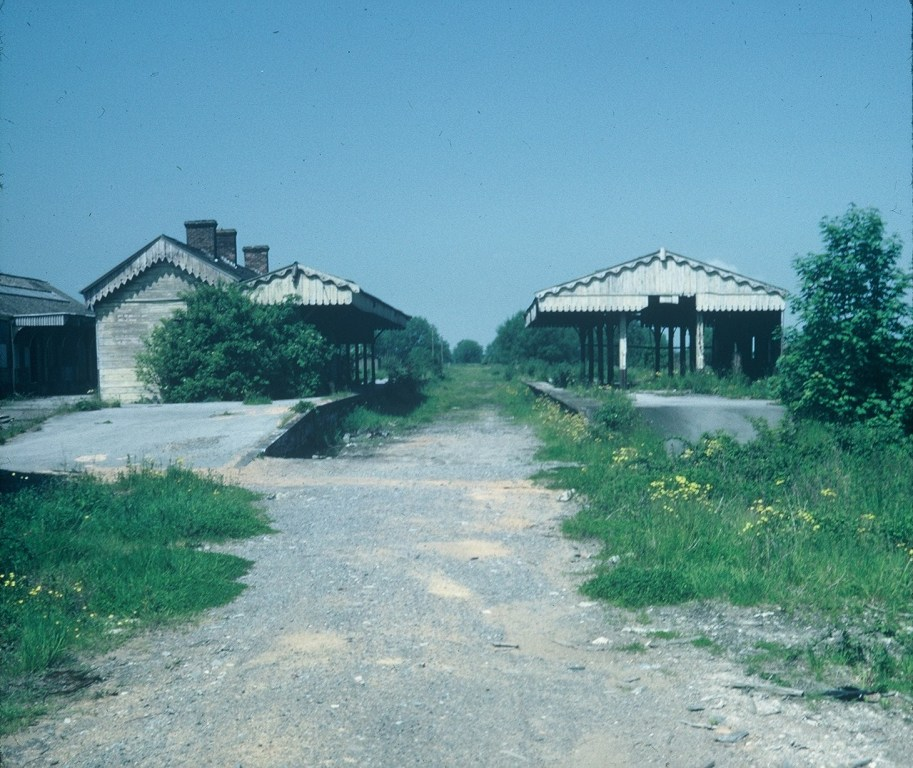
- Glastonbury and Street station photographed in June 1979. It had been closed to passengers since 1966.

General information
- Location: Glastonbury, Somerset; England
- Grid reference: ST491389
- Platforms: 3

Other information
- Status: Disused

History
- Pre-grouping: Somerset Central Railway
- Post-grouping: SR and LMS; Western Region of British Railways

Key dates
- 28 August 1854: Opened (Glastonbury)
- July 1886: Renamed (Glastonbury and Street)
- 7 March 1966: Closed
Location

Glastonbury and Street railway station was the biggest station on the original Somerset and Dorset Joint Railway main line from Highbridge to Evercreech Junction until closed in 1966 under the Beeching axe. It was the junction for the short branch line to Wells which closed in 1951.

Opened in 1854 as Glastonbury, and renamed in 1886 to show that it also served the adjacent village of Street, it had three platforms, two for Evercreech to Highbridge services and one for the branch service to Wells. The station had a large goods yard controlled from a signal box.

== Services ==
Preceding station	Disused railways	Following station
West Pennard; Line and station closed	Somerset & Dorset Joint Railway; LSWR & Midland Railways; Highbridge Branch and Bridgwater Branch	Ashcott; Line and station closed
Polsham; Line and station closed	Somerset & Dorset Joint Railway; LSWR & Midland Railways; Wells Branch	Ashcott; Line and station closed

== The site today ==
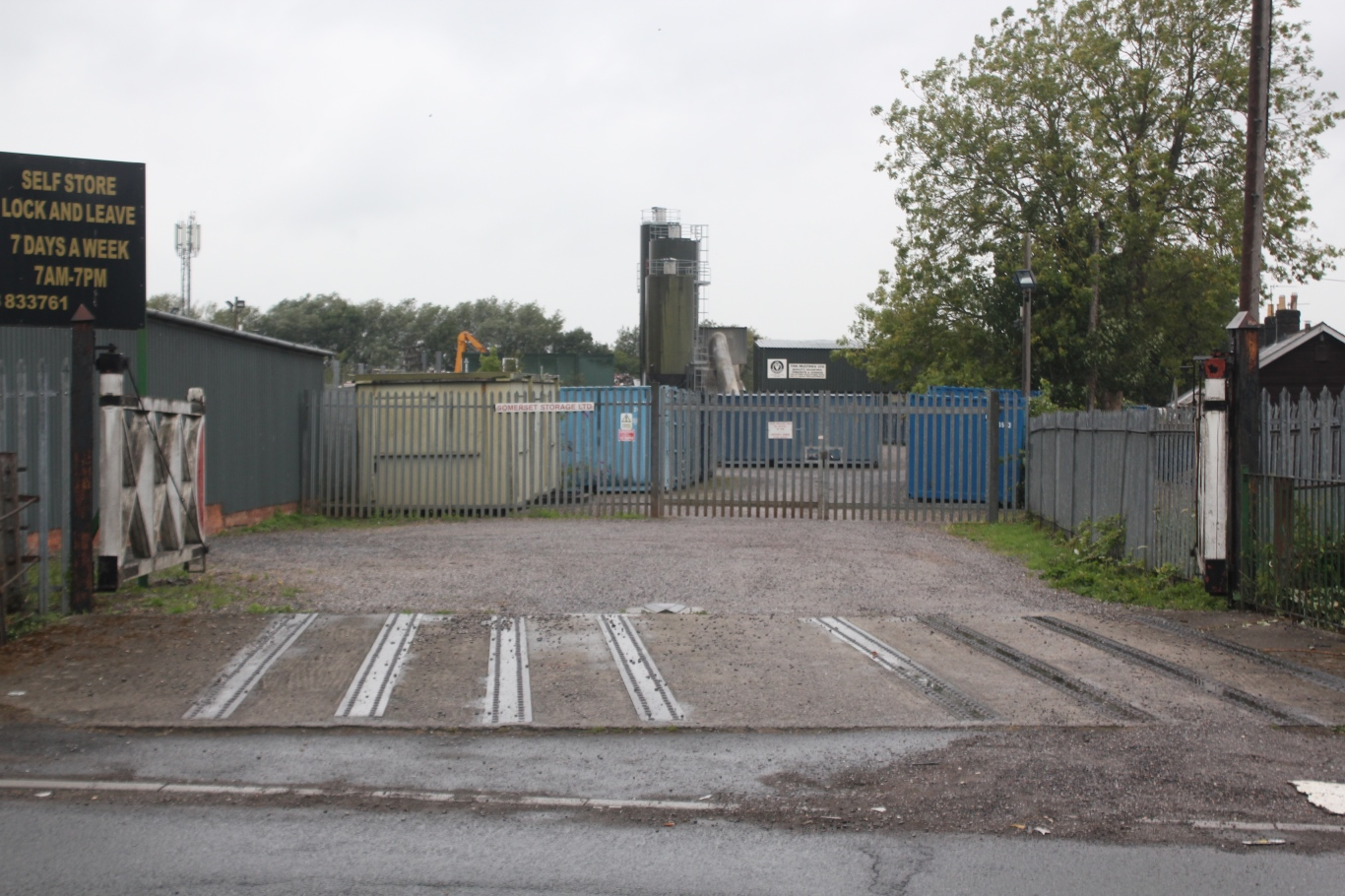
As seen in 2018

The site is now used by a timber merchant and for storage. Replica level crossing gates have been placed at the entrance. The former railway station canopy is now used as a shelter in the market area car park in Glastonbury.
