= Bristol and Exeter Railway locomotives =

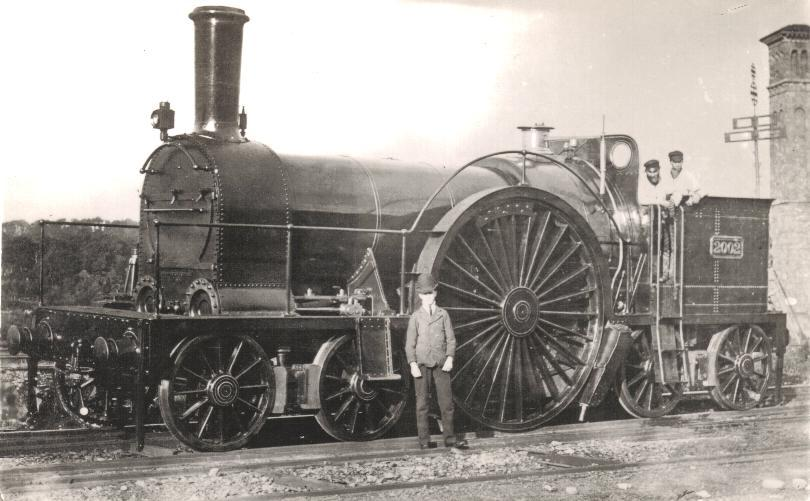
8ft 10in Pearson 4-2-4T no. 2002 (previously no. 40) at Exeter in 1876

The Bristol and Exeter Railway locomotives worked trains on the Bristol and Exeter Railway from 1 May 1849 until the railway was amalgamated with the Great Western Railway on 1 January 1876.

== Background ==
The Great Western Railway had leased the Bristol and Exeter Railway from its opening and provided the locomotives up until 1849.

To enable the Bristol and Exeter to work its own trains from 1 May 1849, 28 locomotives were built to designs by Daniel Gooch: twenty 4-2-2s for passenger services and eight 0-6-0s for goods trains.

Charles Hutton Gregory was responsible for the locomotives until May 1850, when James Pearson was appointed as Locomotive Engineer. He designed several classes of tank engines, including his distinctive large 4-2-4T locomotives, the first of which were introduced in 1854. Workshops were established at Bristol in September 1854 and the company built some of its own locomotives there.

Some standard gauge locomotives were necessary from 1867 as lines were converted from broad gauge. The company also owned two 3 ft (91 cm)-gauge locomotives that worked in the railway's quarry at Burlescombe. The stock had expanded to 125 locomotives by 1875:

Locomotives transferred to GWR in 1876
Type	Broad gauge	Standard gauge	3 ft gauge
0-6-0	30	16	0
2-4-0	13	3	0
4-2-2	8	0	0
4-4-0T	26	0	0
4-2-4T	6	0	0
0-6-0T	5	2	0
2-4-2T	0	2	0
2-2-2T	4	0	0
2-4-2T	0	2	0
0-4-0T	3	3	2
Total	95	28	2

The Bristol and Exeter Railway provided the broad gauge locomotive power on most of the railways with which it had junctions:

- Bristol and Portishead Port and Pier Railway
- Somerset Central Railway
- West Somerset Railway and Minehead Railway
- Devon and Somerset Railway
- Exeter and Crediton Railway

== Engineering ==
The railway established workshops at Bristol Temple Meads railway station in September 1854, the site later being known as Bath Road. Engine sheds were provided at major stations and on some branches including at Taunton railway station and Exeter St Davids railway station.

The engineer was Charles Hutton Gregory until May 1850, when James Pearson was appointed as Locomotive Engineer. He designed several classes of tank engines, including large 4-2-4T locomotives.

== Locomotive types ==
=== Broad gauge ===
- 1849 4-2-2 locomotives – 20 passenger locomotives
- 1849 0-6-0 locomotives – 12 goods locomotives
- 1849 Fairfield – a steam railmotor
- 1851 2-2-2T locomotives – 7 small tank locomotives
- 1854 4-2-4T locomotives – 8 locomotives with 9 feet wheels
- 1855 4-4-0ST locomotives – 26 saddle tank locomotives
- 1856 0-6-0 locomotives – 6 goods locomotives
- 1859 4-2-4T replacements – 2 locomotives with 7 feet 6-inch wheels
- 1866 0-6-0ST locomotives – 2 small tank locomotives
- 1868 4-2-4T renewals – 4 locomotives with 8 feet 10-inch wheels
- 1870 2-4-0 locomotives – 10 passenger locomotives
- 1872 0-4-0T locomotives – 2 small well tank locomotives
- 1872 0-6-0 locomotives – 14 'Swindon' Class goods locomotives purchased from the Great Western Railway
- 1874 2-4-0 locomotives – 3 convertible passenger locomotives
- 1874 no. 110 – a small tank engine, originally built for the South Wales Mineral Railway
- 1874 0-6-0T no. 111

=== Standard gauge ===
The Bristol and Exeter Railway operated 28 standard gauge locomotives, all of which became GWR property on 1 January 1876.

- 0-6-0 – 6 built 1867–68: B&E nos. 77–82; GWR nos. 1360–5 Five of these spent a short while between 1870/71 and 1875 working as broad gauge locomotives.
- 2-4-2T – 2 built 1868: B&E nos. 83–84; GWR nos. 1353–4
- 2-4-0 – 3 built 1874–75: B&E nos. 3, 1, 16; GWR nos. 1355–7
- 0-6-0T – 2 built 1874–75: B&E nos. 114–115; GWR nos. 1376–7
- 0-4-0T – 3 built 1875: B&E nos. 93–95; GWR nos. 1378–80
- 0-6-0 – 10 built 1875: B&E nos. 116–125; GWR nos. 1366–75
- 2-4-0T – 2 built 1876: B&E nos. 30, 33; GWR nos. 1358–9

=== Narrow gauge ===
The Bristol and Exeter Railway built two 0-4-0WT locomotives in 1874/75 at Bristol – numbers 112 and 113 – for working the 3 feet gauge lines in its ballast quarry at Westleigh, Devon to the main line at Burlescombe. They were renumbered 1381/2 when acquired by the GWR, and following the conversion of the line to standard gauge in 1898, were sold in 1899.

== Locomotives in numerical order ==
- 1
  1849 Broad gauge 4-2-2
  1875 Standard gauge 2-4-0
- 2
  1849 Broad gauge 4-2-2
  1872 Broad gauge 2-4-0
- 3
  1849 Broad gauge 4-2-2
  1874 Standard gauge 2-4-0
- 4
  1849 Broad gauge 4-2-2
  1871 Broad gauge 2-4-0
- 5
  1849 Broad gauge 4-2-2
  1871 Broad gauge 2-4-0
- 6
  1849 Broad gauge 4-2-2
  1870 Broad gauge 2-4-0
- 7
  1849 Broad gauge 4-2-2
- 8
  1849 Broad gauge 4-2-2
  1872 Broad gauge 2-4-0
- 9
  1849 Broad gauge 4-2-2
- 10
  1849 Broad gauge 4-2-2
- 11
  1849 Broad gauge 4-2-2
  1874 Convertible 2-4-0
- 12
  1849 Broad gauge 4-2-2
  1862 Broad gauge 7 feet 6-inch 4-2-4T
- 13
  1849 Broad gauge 4-2-2
- 14
  1849 Broad gauge 4-2-2
  1870 Broad gauge 2-4-0
- 15
  1849 Broad gauge 4-2-2
- 16
  1849 Broad gauge 4-2-2
  1875 Standard gauge 2-4-0
- 17
  1849 Broad gauge 4-2-2
- 18
  1849 Broad gauge 4-2-2
- 19
  1849 Broad gauge 4-2-2
- 20
  1849 Broad gauge 4-2-2
  1874 Convertible 2-4-0
- 21
  1849 Broad gauge 0-6-0
- 22
  1849 Broad gauge 0-6-0
- 23
  1849 Broad gauge 0-6-0
- 24
  1849 Broad gauge 0-6-0
- 25
  1849 Broad gauge 0-6-0
- 26
  1849 Broad gauge 0-6-0
- 27
  1849 Broad gauge 0-6-0
- 28
  1849 Broad gauge 0-6-0
- 29
  1849 Fairfield
  1859 Broad gauge 7 feet 6-inch 4-2-4T
- 30
  1851 Broad gauge 2-2-2T
  1876 Standard gauge 2-4-0T
- 31
  1851 Broad gauge 2-2-2T
- 32
  1851 Broad gauge 2-2-2T
- 33
  1851 Broad gauge 2-2-2T
  1876 Standard gauge 2-4-0T
- 34
  1851 Broad gauge 2-2-2T
  1875 Convertible 2-4-0
- 35
  1853 Broad gauge 0-6-0
- 36
  1853 Broad gauge 0-6-0
- 37
  1853 Broad gauge 0-6-0
- 38
  1853 Broad gauge 0-6-0
- 39
  1853 Broad gauge 9 feet 4-2-4T
  1868 Broad gauge 8 feet 10-inch 4-2-4T
- 40
  1853 Broad gauge 9 feet 4-2-4T
  1873 Broad gauge 8 feet 10-inch 4-2-4T
- 41
  1853 Broad gauge 9 feet 4-2-4T
  1868 Broad gauge 8 feet 10-inch 4-2-4T
- 42
  1854 Broad gauge 9 feet 4-2-4T
  1868 Broad gauge 8 feet 10-inch 4-2-4T
- 43
  1854 Broad gauge 9 feet 4-2-4T
  1871 Broad gauge 2-4-0
- 44
  1854 Broad gauge 9 feet 4-2-4T
  1870 Broad gauge 2-4-0
- 45
  1854 Broad gauge 9 feet 4-2-4T
  1870 Broad gauge 2-4-0
- 46
  1854 Broad gauge 9 feet 4-2-4T
  1870 Broad gauge 2-4-0
- 47
  1855 Broad gauge 4-4-0ST
- 48
  1855 Broad gauge 4-4-0ST
- 49
  1855 Broad gauge 4-4-0ST
- 50
  1855 Broad gauge 4-4-0ST
- 51
  1855 Broad gauge 4-4-0ST
- 52
  1855 Broad gauge 4-4-0ST
- 53
  1856 Broad gauge 0-6-0
- 54
  1856 Broad gauge 0-6-0
- 55
  1856 Broad gauge 0-6-0
- 56
  1856 Broad gauge 0-6-0
- 57
  1859 Broad gauge 2-2-2T
- 58
  1859 Broad gauge 2-2-2T
- 59
  1860 Broad gauge 0-6-0
- 60
  1860 Broad gauge 0-6-0
- 61
  1862 Broad gauge 4-4-0ST
- 62
  1862 Broad gauge 4-4-0ST
- 63
  1862 Broad gauge 4-4-0ST
- 64
  1862 Broad gauge 4-4-0ST
- 65
  1867 Broad gauge 4-4-0ST
- 66
  1867 Broad gauge 4-4-0ST
- 67
  1867 Broad gauge 4-4-0ST
- 68
  1867 Broad gauge 4-4-0ST
- 69
  1867 Broad gauge 4-4-0ST
- 70
  1867 Broad gauge 4-4-0ST
- 71
  1867 Broad gauge 4-4-0ST
- 72
  1867 Broad gauge 4-4-0ST
- 73
  1867 Broad gauge 4-4-0ST
- 74
  1867 Broad gauge 4-4-0ST
- 75
  1866 Broad gauge 0-6-0ST
- 76
  1866 Broad gauge 0-6-0ST
- 77
  1867 Standard gauge 0-6-0
- 78
  1867 Standard gauge 0-6-0
- 79
  1867 Standard gauge 0-6-0
- 80
  1867 Standard gauge 0-6-0
- 81
  1867 Standard gauge 0-6-0
- 82
  1867 Standard gauge 0-6-0
- 83
  1868 Standard gauge 2-4-0
- 84
  1868 Standard gauge 2-4-0
- 85
  1873 Broad gauge 4-4-0ST
- 86
  1873 Broad gauge 4-4-0ST
- 87
  1873 Broad gauge 4-4-0ST
- 88
  1873 Broad gauge 4-4-0ST
- 89
  1873 Broad gauge 4-4-0ST
- 90
  1873 Broad gauge 4-4-0ST
- 91
  1872 Broad gauge 0-4-0T
- 92
  1874 Broad gauge 0-4-0T
- 93
  Standard gauge 0-4-0ST
- 94
  Standard gauge 0-4-0ST
- 95
  Standard gauge 0-4-0ST
- 96
  1872 ex-GWR Swindon Class broad gauge 0-6-0 Shrewsbury
- 97
  1872 ex-GWR Swindon Class broad gauge 0-6-0 Hereford
- 98
  1873 ex-GWR Swindon Class broad gauge 0-6-0 Chester
- 99
  1873 ex-GWR Swindon Class broad gauge 0-6-0 Windsor
- 100
  1873 ex-GWR Swindon Class broad gauge 0-6-0 London
- 101
  1873 ex-GWR Swindon Class broad gauge 0-6-0 Bristol
- 102
  1873 ex-GWR Swindon Class broad gauge 0-6-0 Gloucester
- 103
  1873 ex-GWR Swindon Class broad gauge 0-6-0 Birmingham
- 104
  1874 ex-GWR Swindon Class broad gauge 0-6-0 Wolverhampton
- 105
  1874 ex-GWR Swindon Class broad gauge 0-6-0 Bath
- 106
  1874 ex-GWR Swindon Class broad gauge 0-6-0 Newport
- 107
  1874 ex-GWR Swindon Class broad gauge 0-6-0 Reading
- 108
  1874 ex-GWR Swindon Class broad gauge 0-6-0 Oxford
- 109
  1874 ex-GWR Swindon Class broad gauge 0-6-0 Swindon
- 110
  1874 ex-South Wales Mineral Railway broad gauge 0-4-0WT
- 111
  1874 Broad gauge 0-6-0T
- 112
  1874 3 feet gauge 0-4-0WT for Westleigh Quarry
- 113
  1874 3 feet gauge 0-4-0WT for Westleigh Quarry
- 114
  1874 Standard gauge 0-6-0T locomotive for the Culm Valley Light Railway
- 115
  1875 Standard gauge 0-6-0T locomotive for the Culm Valley Light Railway
- 116
  1875 Standard gauge 0-6-0
- 117
  1875 Standard gauge 0-6-0
- 118
  1875 Standard gauge 0-6-0
- 119
  1875 Standard gauge 0-6-0
- 120
  1875 Standard gauge 0-6-0
- 121
  1875 Standard gauge 0-6-0
- 122
  1875 Standard gauge 0-6-0
- 123
  1875 Standard gauge 0-6-0
- 124
  1875 Standard gauge 0-6-0
- 125
  1875 Standard gauge 0-6-0
