= Bristol and Exeter Railway 0-6-0 locomotives =

The Bristol and Exeter Railway 0-6-0 locomotives include three different types of broad gauge and standard gauge 0-6-0 steam locomotives designed for working freight trains. On 1 January 1876 the Bristol and Exeter Railway was amalgamated with the Great Western Railway, after which the locomotives were given new numbers.

== Broad gauge locomotives ==
=== 16 inch ===
B&ER 0-6-0
Type and origin
- Power type: Steam
- Designer: Daniel Gooch
- Builder: Stothert and Slaughter
Specifications
- Configuration
  - Whyte: 0-6-0
- Gauge: 7 ft 0 1/4 in
- Driver dia.: 5 ft 0 in
- Wheelbase: 15 ft 6 in
- Cylinder size: 16 in dia × 24 in stroke

Twelve goods locomotives, similar to the GWR Pyracmon Class, built by the Stothert and Slaughter in 1849 and 1853. The last one was withdrawn in 1885.

- 21 (1849–1884) GWR No. 2065
- 22 (1849–1883) GWR No. 2066
- 23 (1849–1885) GWR No. 2067
- 24 (1849–1884) GWR No. 2068
- 25 (1849–1884) GWR No. 2069
- 26 (1849–1887) GWR No. 2070
- 27 (1849–1883) GWR No. 2071
- 28 (1849–1876) GWR No. 2072
- 35 (1853–1876) GWR No. 2073
- 36 (1853–1877) GWR No. 2074
- 37 (1853–1884) GWR No. 2075
- 38 (1853–1880) GWR No. 2076

=== 17 inch ===
B&ER 0-6-0
Type and origin
- Power type: Steam
- Designer: James Pearson
- Builder: Stothert and Slaughter and Rothwell and Company
Specifications
- Configuration
  - Whyte: 0-6-0
- Gauge: 7 ft 0 1/4 in
- Driver dia.: 5 ft 0 in
- Wheelbase: 15 ft 6 in
- Cylinder size: 17 in dia × 24 in stroke

Four locomotives built in 1856 by Stothert and Slaughter and two more in 1860 by Rothwell and Company. The last one survived until 1890.

- 53 (1856–1885) GWR No. 2059
- 54 (1856–1888) GWR No. 2060
- 55 (1856–1884) GWR No. 2061
- 56 (1856–1890) GWR No. 2062
- 59 (1860–1887) GWR No. 2063
- 60 (1860–1884) GWR No. 2064

== Standard gauge locomotives ==
=== Worcester Engine Company ===
These 0-6-0 locomotives were built by the Worcester Engine Company in 1867. Five of these six were converted to run on the broad gauge and then reconverted later to standard gauge.

- 77
- 78
- 79
- 80
- 81
- 82

=== Sharp Stewart ===
Ten 0-6-0 locomotives built by Sharp, Stewart and Company in 1875.

- 116
- 117
- 118
- 119
- 120
- 121
- 122
- 123
- 124
- 125

== See also ==
- GWR Swindon Class – 14 locomotives bought by the Bristol and Exeter Railway in 1872
