= T. D. Judah =

Scrapped 4-2-2 steam locomotive operated by the Central Pacific Railroad

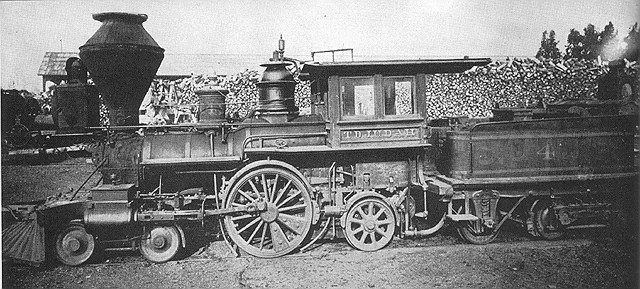
- T. D. Judah in its post-rebuild 4-2-2 configuration
Type and origin
- Power type: Steam
- Builder: Cooke Locomotive Works
- Build date: November 1863
- Rebuild date: 1872
Specifications
- Configuration
  - Whyte: 4-2-4T, later rebuilt to 4-2-2 with separate tender
- Gauge: 4 ft 8 1/2 in (1,435 mm) standard gauge
- Driver dia.: 54 in (1,372 mm)
- Adhesive weight: 18,500 lb (8,400 kg; 8.4 t)
- Loco weight: 39,000 lb (18,000 kg; 18 t)
- Boiler pressure: 125 lbf/in^{2} (0.86 MPa)
- Cylinders: Two, outside
- Cylinder size: 11 in × 15 in (279 mm × 381 mm)
Performance figures
- Tractive effort: 3,571 lbf (15.88 kN)
Career
- Operators: Central Pacific
- Numbers: 4; renum 1882 in 1906
- Official name: T. D. Judah
- First run: April 9, 1864
- Disposition: Scrapped 1912

T. D. Judah was the name of a 4-2-2 steam locomotive owned by the Central Pacific Railroad. It was named in honor of the railroad's first chief engineer, Theodore Dehone Judah, who had championed and surveyed a passable route over the Sierra Nevada for the Transcontinental Railroad.

== History and career ==
Like its sister engine, C. P. Huntington, T. D. Judah was originally built by the Cooke Locomotive Works in 1863 for a railroad that was unable to pay for it. Later, the two were seen in the Cooke shops by Collis Huntington and purchased for use on the Central Pacific Railroad (CP), becoming the road's third and fourth locomotives respectively. Two other, larger engines, Gov. Stanford (number 1, built by Norris Locomotive Works) and Pacific (number 2, built by Mason Machine Works) had been purchased earlier.

Originally built as a 4-2-4T Forney type, T. D. Judah was a locomotive and tender on one frame. In 1872 the engine was rebuilt as a 4-2-2 with separate tender and may have been given other mechanical upgrades like its sister engine. The rebuild reduced the locomotive's overall weight to 30,000 lb (14,000 kg), with 15,000 lb (6,800 kg) on the drivers.

T. D. Judah was sold to the Wellington Colliery Company on Vancouver Island, British Columbia, Canada, where it found service as Wellington Colliery Railway's Queen Anne. It was subsequently scrapped in 1912.

== In popular culture ==
In the 1991 film The Little Engine that Could, Tillie and Jebediah are based on this engine but are portrayed as 4-2-2 tank engines.
