= Bristol and Exeter Railway 2-4-0 locomotives =

The Bristol and Exeter Railway 2-4-0 locomotives were two classes of 2-4-0 broad gauge steam locomotives.

On 1 January 1876 the Bristol and Exeter Railway was amalgamated with the Great Western Railway, after which the locomotives were given new numbers. They were used as pilot engines at large stations and on other light duties shared with the GWR Hawthorn Class.

== List of locomotives ==
=== Broad gauge ===
B&ER 2-4-0
Type and origin
- Power type: Steam
- Designer: James Pearson
- Builder: Bristol and Exeter Railway
Specifications
- Configuration
  - Whyte: 2-4-0
- Gauge: 7 feet 0 1/4 inch (2.140 m)
- Leading dia.: 4 feet 0 inches (1.22 m)
- Driver dia.: 6 feet 7 1/2 inches (2.019 m)
- Wheelbase: 15 feet 8 inches (4.78 m)
- Cylinder size: 17 by 24 inches (430 mm × 610 mm) stroke

The first ten locomotives were introduced in 1870 to replace 1849 built 4-2-2s. The last of the locomotives were withdrawn at the end of the broad gauge on 20 May 1892.

- 2 (1872 – 1888) GWR No. 2015
- 4 (1871 – 1892) GWR No. 2016
- 5 (1871 – 1892) GWR No. 2017
- 6 (1870 – 1890) GWR No. 2018
- 8 (1872 – 1889) GWR No. 2019
- 14 (1870 – 1892) GWR No. 2020
- 43 (1871 – 1892) GWR No. 2021
- 44 (1870 – 1888) GWR No. 2022
- 45 (1870 – 1888) GWR No. 2023
- 46 (1870 – 1889) GWR No. 2024

=== Convertible ===
B&ER 2-4-0
Type and origin
- Power type: Steam
- Designer: James Pearson
- Builder: Bristol and Exeter Railway
Specifications
- Configuration
  - Whyte: 2-4-0
- Gauge: 7 feet 0 1/4 inch (2.140 m)
- Leading dia.: 4 feet 0 inches (1.22 m)
- Driver dia.: 6 feet 4 inches (1.93 m)
- Wheelbase: 15 feet 8 inches (4.78 m)

Three more locomotives were built in 1874. These were designed to be converted to standard gauge but this was never carried out, the locomotives all being withdrawn by 1886.

- 11 (1874 – 1886) GWR No. 2025
- 20 (1874 – 1886) GWR No. 2026
- 34 (1875 – 1884) GWR No. 2027

=== Standard gauge ===
B&ER 2-4-0
Type and origin
- Power type: Steam
- Designer: James Pearson
- Builder: Bristol and Exeter Railway
Specifications
- Configuration
  - Whyte: 2-4-0
- Gauge: 4 feet 8 1/2 inches (1.435 m)
- Leading dia.: 4 feet 0 inches (1.22 m)
- Driver dia.: 6 feet 4 inches (1.93 m)
- Wheelbase: 15 feet 4 inches (4.67 m)

Three locomotives were built in 1874 at the same time as the convertibles, and similar in several ways. These were always standard gauge.

- 3 (1874 – 1883) GWR No. 1355
- 1 (1875 – 1881) GWR No. 1356
- 16 (1875 – 1884) GWR No. 1357
