= Bristol and Exeter Railway 0-6-0T locomotives =

The Bristol and Exeter Railway 0-6-0T locomotives were two different types of 0-6-0T locomotives built for the Bristol and Exeter Railway. On 1 January 1876, the Bristol and Exeter Railway was amalgamated with the Great Western Railway, after which the locomotives were given new numbers.

== List of locomotives ==
=== Broad gauge ===
B&ER 0-6-0ST
Type and origin
- Power type: Steam
- Designer: James Pearson
- Builder: Bristol and Exeter Railway
Specifications
- Configuration
  - Whyte: 0-6-0ST
- Gauge: 7 feet 0 1/4 inch (2.140 m)
- Driver dia.: 3 feet 6 inches (1.07 m)
- Wheelbase: 13 feet 6 inches (4.11 m)
- Cylinder size: 17 by 24 inches (430 mm × 610 mm)

Two small 0-6-0ST broad gauge locomotives. The first had a 950 gallon tank, the second had a larger 1,200 gallon one.

- 75 (1866 – 1888) GWR No. 2092
- 76 (1867 – 1890) GWR No. 2093

=== Standard gauge ===
B&ER 0-6-0ST
Type and origin
- Power type: Steam
Specifications
- Configuration
  - Whyte: 0-6-0T
- Gauge: 4 feet 8 1/2 inches (1.435 m)
- Driver dia.: 3 feet 6 inches (1.07 m)

Two standard gauge 0-6-0T locomotives were built for the Culm Valley Light Railway which was then under construction. They were operated on the line until 1881, when they were superseded by 1298 and 1300, two 2-4-0T locomotives which had started life as South Devon Railway locomotives.

- 114 (1874 – 1934) GWR No. 1376
- 115 (1875 – 1927) GWR No. 1377
