= Bristol and Exeter Railway Fairfield steam carriage =

Fairfield
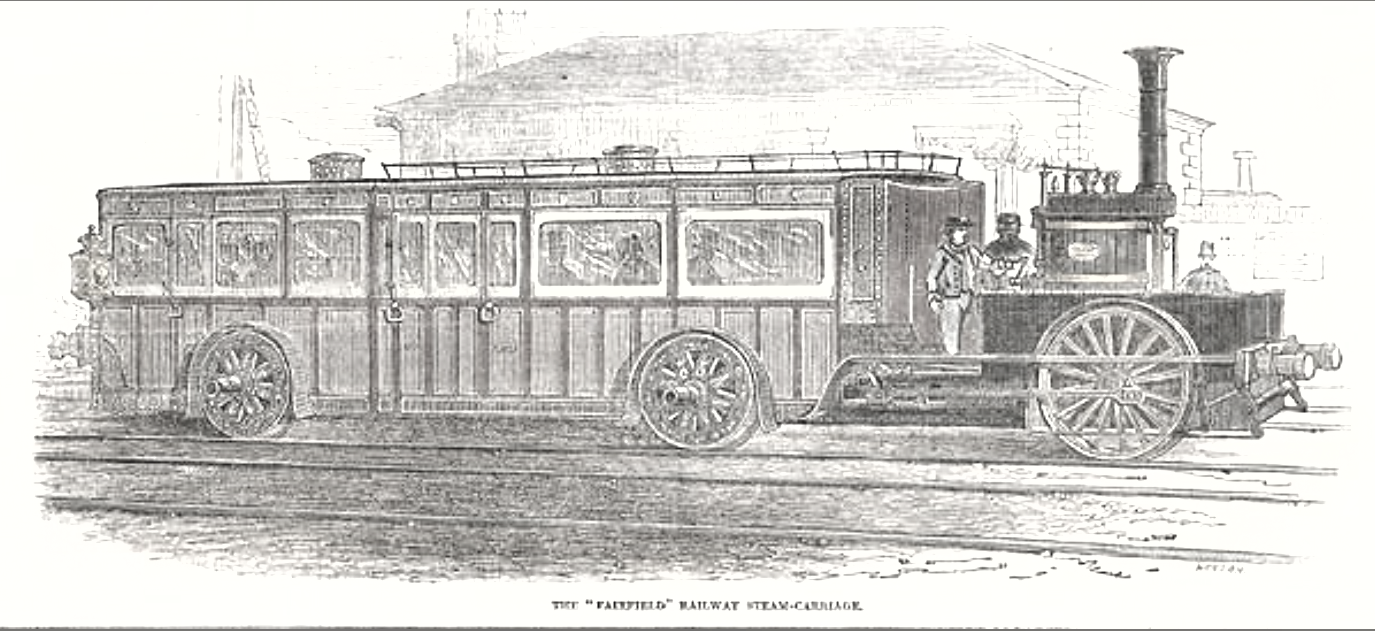
Type and origin
- Power type: Steam
- Designer: William Bridges Adams
- Builder: Adams and Company
Specifications
- Configuration
  - Whyte: 0-2-4
- Gauge: 7 ft 1/4 in (2,140 mm)
- Driver dia.: 4 ft 6 in (1,372 mm)
- Trailing dia.: 3 ft 6 in (1,067 mm)
- Wheelbase: 28 ft 0 in (8.53 m)
- Cylinder size: 8 in × 12 in (203 mm × 305 mm) dia × stroke
Career
- Operators: Bristol and Exeter Railway
- Class: Steam carriage

The Bristol and Exeter Railway Fairfield was an experimental broad gauge self-propelled steam carriage. In later use the carriage portion was removed and it was used as a small shunting locomotive.

== Steam carriage ==
The steam carriage was built to the design of William Bridges Adams at Fairfield Works in Bow, London. It was tested on the West London Railway late in 1848, although it was early in 1850 before modifications had been made that allowed Adams to demonstrate that it was working to the agreed standards. The design was not perpetuated by the Bristol and Exeter Railway, instead they purchased small 2-2-2T locomotives for working their branch lines..

It worked on the Clevedon and Tiverton branches, although it may have worked on the Weston branch as well.

The power unit had a single pair of driving wheels driven through a jackshaft by small 8-by-12-inch (203 mm × 305 mm) cylinders. Originally equipped with a vertical boiler 6 feet (1,800 mm) in height, 3 feet (910 mm) in diameter, this was replaced by a horizontal boiler length 7 feet 7 inches (2,310 mm), diameter 2 feet 6 inches (760 mm). The boiler was not covered by a cab or other bodywork; the two pairs of carrying wheels were beneath the carriage portion. It had seats for 16 first class and 32 second class passengers. It was once timed as running at 52 miles per hour (84 km/h).

It was numbered 29 in the Bristol and Exeter Railway locomotive list but generally referred to as "the Fairfield locomotive".

Adams built other steam railmotors at around the same time, but the concept was not expanded on. It was revived near the end of the century and the Great Western Railway built a fleet of around 100 bogie rail motors, which developed into an autotrain system where a locomotive driver could control the train from a cab in the carriage similar to modern multiple unit trains.

== Shunting locomotive ==
The carriage portion was removed in 1851 and the power unit rebuilt, presumably with a new pair of carrying wheels making it an 0-2-2. Its use for the next few years is unclear, although it might have been moved to Taunton to pump water.

It was sold to Messrs Hutchinson and Ritson in 1856, the engineering contractors who were working on the Somerset Central Railway. Before delivery, the Bristol and Exeter Railway had to rebuild it as an 0-4-0. The price agreed was £600, paid in prepared timber.
