= Bristol and Exeter Railway 0-4-0T locomotives =

The Bristol and Exeter Railway 0-4-0T locomotives were five small 0-4-0T locomotives built for shunting by the Bristol and Exeter Railway. On 1 January 1876 the Bristol and Exeter Railway was amalgamated with the Great Western Railway, after which the locomotives were given new numbers.

== Broad gauge ==
B&ER 0-4-0T
Type and origin
- Power type: Steam
- Designer: James Pearson
- Builder: Bristol and Exeter Railway
Specifications
- Configuration
  - Whyte: 0-4-0T
- Gauge: 7 ft 1/4 in (2,140 mm)
- Driver dia.: 3 ft 6 in (1,070 mm)
- Wheelbase: 8 ft 10 in (2.69 m)
- Cylinder size: 14 in × 18 in (360 mm × 460 mm)

Two small 0-4-0T locomotives built for shunting by the Bristol and Exeter Railway.

- 91 (1872 – 1880) GWR No. 2094
- 92 (1874 – 1881) GWR No. 2095

These were the smallest locomotives built for the Bristol and Exeter Railway and were unique among broad gauge locomotives in having outside cylinders.

== Standard gauge ==
B&ER 0-4-0T
Type and origin
- Power type: Steam
- Designer: James Pearson
- Builder: Bristol and Exeter Railway
Specifications
- Configuration
  - Whyte: 0-4-0T
- Gauge: 4 ft 8 1/2 in (1,435 mm)
- Driver dia.: 4 ft 0 in (1,220 mm)
- Wheelbase: 9 ft 0 in (2.74 m)
- Cylinder size: 14 in × 18 in (360 mm × 460 mm)

Three small 0-4-0T locomotives built for shunting by the Bristol and Exeter Railway.

- 93 (1875 – 1880) GWR No. 1378
- 94 (1875 – 1880) GWR No. 1379
- 95 (1875 – 1880) GWR No. 1380
