= Bristol and Exeter Railway 4-2-4T locomotives =

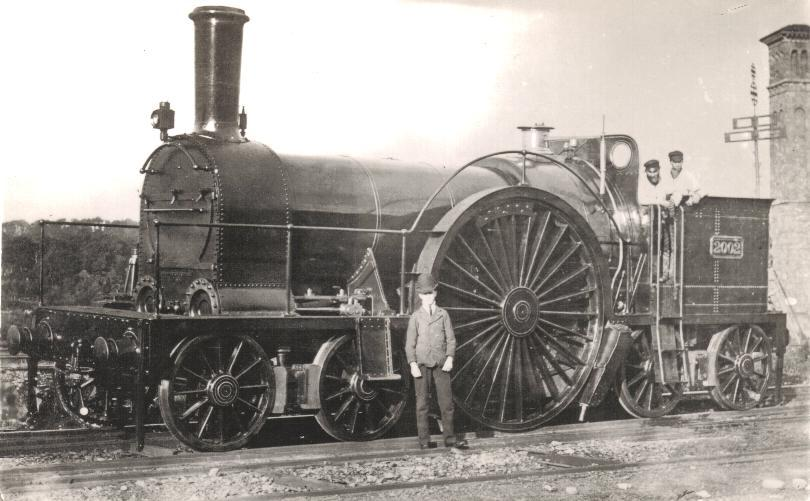
8ft 10in Pearson 4-2-4T GWR no. 2002 (originally B&ER no. 40) at Exeter in 1876

The 14 Bristol and Exeter Railway 4-2-4T locomotives were broad gauge 4-2-4T steam locomotives built to three different designs. The first entered service in 1853. The Bristol and Exeter Railway was amalgamated into the Great Western Railway on 1 January 1876, and the last of the 4-2-4Ts was withdrawn in 1885.

The distinctive designs by James Pearson, the railway company's engineer, featured single large flangeless driving wheels and two supporting bogies. The water was carried in both well and back tanks, leaving the boilers exposed in the same way as tender locomotives.

The three types are distinguished by the size of driving wheel; the early 9-foot-diameter (2.74 m) wheels being replaced by smaller ones on later designs.

== List of locomotives ==
=== 9 feet ===
B&ER 9ft 4-2-4T
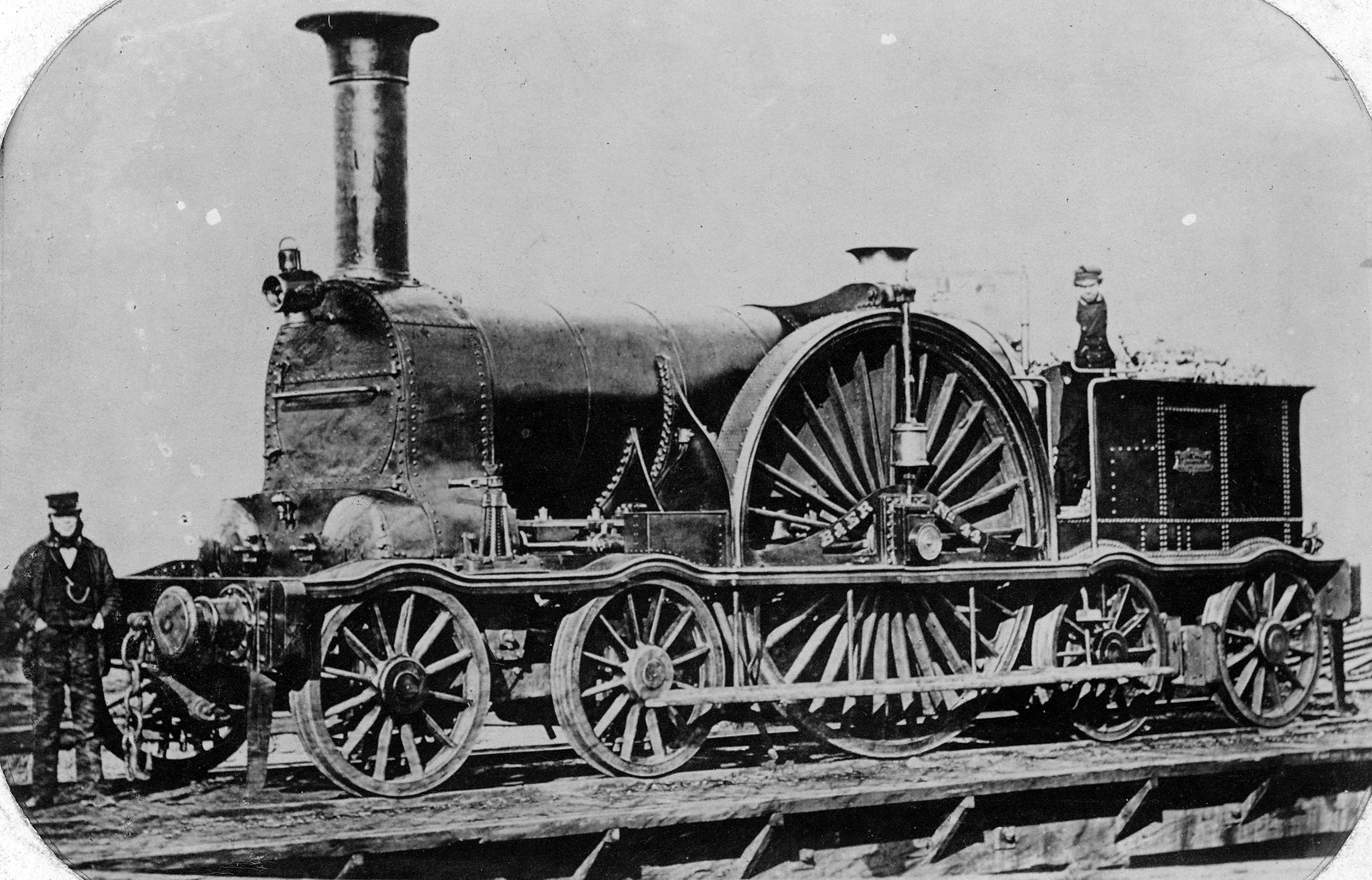
- B&ER locomotive no. 44
Type and origin
- Power type: Steam
- Designer: James Pearson
- Builder: Rothwell and Company
Specifications
- Configuration
  - Whyte: 4-2-4T
- Gauge: 7 ft (2,134 mm)
- Leading dia.: 4 ft 0 in (1.219 m)
- Driver dia.: 9 ft 0 in (2.743 m)
- Trailing dia.: 4 ft 0 in (1.219 m)
- Wheelbase: 24 ft 9 in (7.54 m)
- Cylinder size: 16.5 in × 24 in (419 mm × 610 mm)

- 39 (1853–1868)
- 40 (1853–1873)
- 41 (1853–1873)
- 42 (1854–1868)
- 43 (1854–1871)
- 44 (1854–1870)
- 45 (1854–1870)
- 46 (1854–1870)

The first of Pearson's 4-2-4Ts were eight locomotives built by Rothwell and Company in 1853 and 1854 and were all withdrawn by 1873.

The large wheels gave these locomotives a high top speed, with 81.8 mph (131.6 km/h) being reported on one train descending Wellington Bank in Somerset.

=== 7 feet 6-inch ===
B&ER 7ft 6in 4-2-4T
Type and origin
- Power type: Steam
- Designer: James Pearson
- Builder: Bristol and Exeter Railway
Specifications
- Configuration
  - Whyte: 4-2-4T
- Gauge: 7 ft (2,134 mm)
- Leading dia.: 4 ft 0 in (1.219 m)
- Driver dia.: 7 ft 6 in (2.286 m)
- Trailing dia.: 4 ft 0 in (1.219 m)
- Wheelbase: 25 ft 1 in (7.65 m) or 25 ft 2 1/2 in (7.68 m)
- Cylinder size: 16.5 in × 24 in (419 mm × 610 mm) or 17 in × 24 in (432 mm × 610 mm)

- 12 (1862–1885) GWR No. 2005
- 29 (1859–1880) GWR No. 2006

These two locomotives were built as replacements for more conventional 2-2-2 express passenger locomotives with 7-foot-6-inch (2.29 m) driving wheels and were given wheels of this same size, rather than the 9-foot-diameter (2.7 m) wheels of their 4-2-4T predecessors.

No. 29 was the first locomotive built at the Bristol and Exeter Railway's new Bristol workshops in 1859. It had slightly larger 17-inch-diameter (430 mm) cylinders and a 25-foot-2 1/2-inch (7.684 m) wheelbase. When withdrawn in 1885 it was the end of Pearson's 4-2-4Ts.

No. 12 followed in 1862 and returned to 16 1/2-inch (420 mm) cylinders and had a slightly shorter 25-foot-1-inch (7.65 m) wheelbase.

=== 8 feet 10-inch ===
B&ER 8ft 10in 4-2-4T
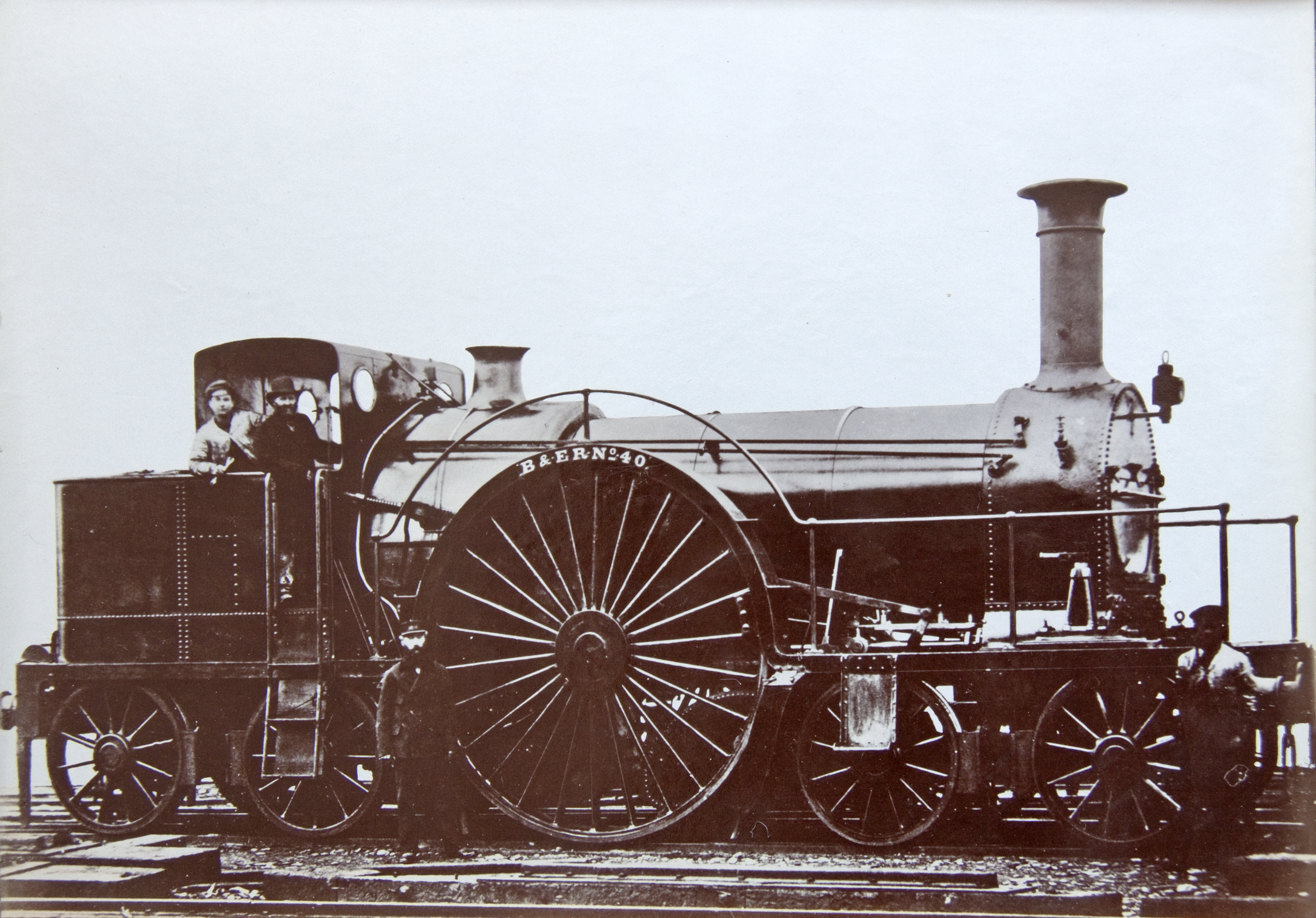
- B&ER locomotive no. 40
Type and origin
- Power type: Steam
- Designer: James Pearson
- Builder: Bristol and Exeter Railway
Specifications
- Configuration
  - Whyte: 4-2-4T
- Gauge: 7 ft (2,134 mm)
- Leading dia.: 4 ft 0 in (1.219 m)
- Driver dia.: 8 ft 10 in (2.692 m)
- Trailing dia.: 4 ft 0 in (1.219 m)
- Wheelbase: 25 ft 6 in (7.77 m)
- Cylinder size: 18 in × 24 in (457 mm × 610 mm)

- 39 (1868–1876) GWR No. 2001
- 40 (1873–1877) GWR No. 2002
- 41 (1868–1877) GWR No. 2003
- 42 (1868–1877) GWR No. 2004

Four of the 9-foot locomotives were replaced by these "renewals", built in the Bristol and Exeter Railway workshops at Bristol. A pair of their new 8-foot-10-inch-diameter (2.69 m) driving wheels can be seen at Swindon Steam Railway Museum.

No. 39, recently renumbered as GWR 2001, derailed at Long Ashton near Bristol on 27 July 1876 and was withdrawn from service. While the poor condition of the track was a contributing factor, it was decided to rebuild the remaining three express 4-2-4Ts to more conventional 4-2-2 tender locomotives.
