= C. P. Huntington =

Preserved 4-2-4T steam locomotive on display at the California State Railroad Museum

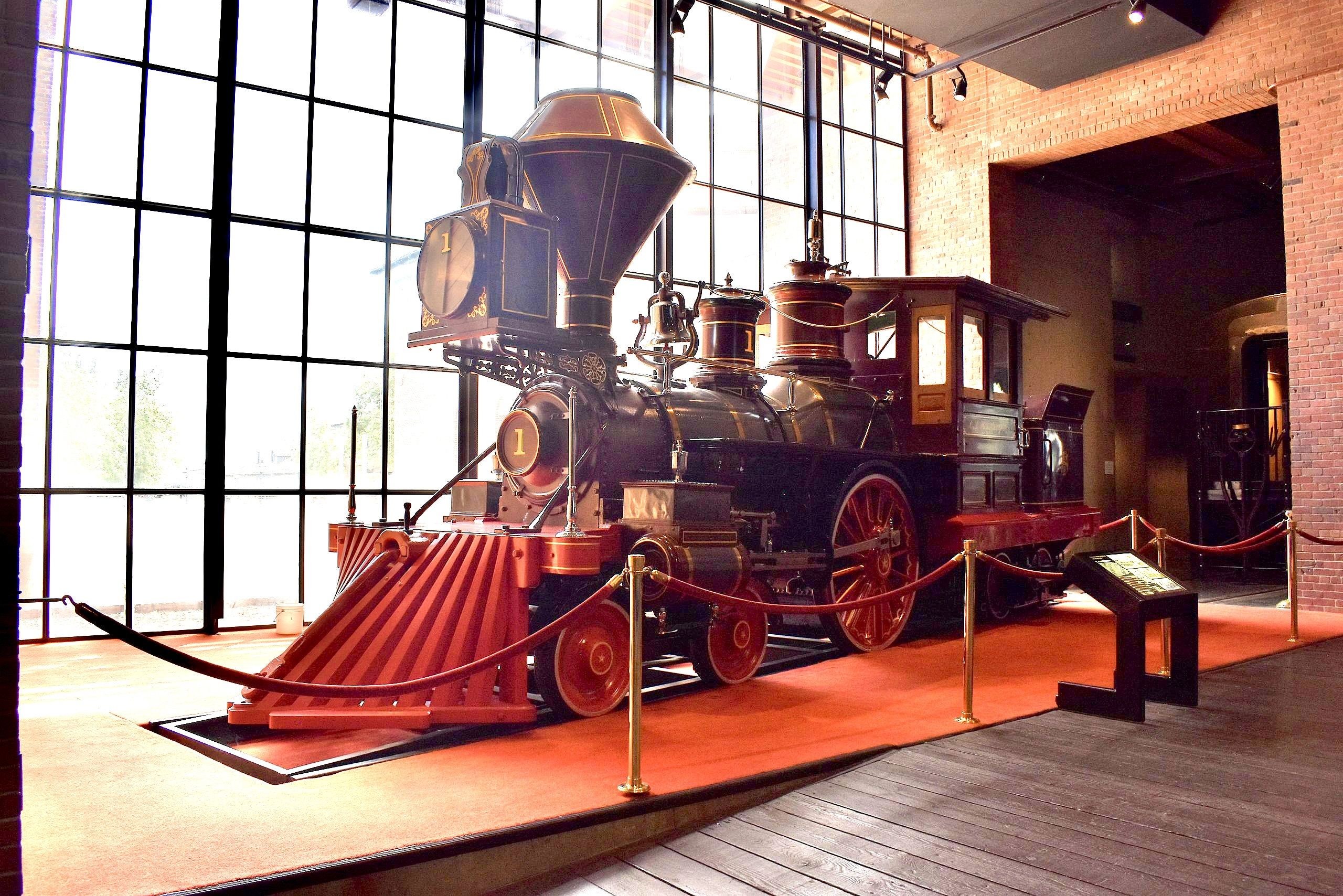
- The C.P. Huntington at the California State Railroad Museum
Type and origin
- Power type: Steam
- Builder: Cooke Locomotive Works
- Serial number: 277
- Build date: October 1863
- Rebuild date: 1888
Specifications
- Configuration
  - Whyte: 4-2-4RT
  - UIC: 2′A2′ n2t
- Gauge: 4 ft 8 1/2 in (1,435 mm) standard gauge
- Driver dia.: 54 in (1,372 mm)
- Adhesive weight: 18,500 lb (8,400 kilograms; 8.4 metric tons)
- Loco weight: 39,000 lb (18,000 kilograms; 18 metric tons)
- Fuel type: Coal
- Boiler pressure: 125 lbf/in^{2} (862 kPa)
- Cylinders: Two, outside
- Cylinder size: 11 in × 15 in (279 mm × 381 mm)
- Valve gear: Stephenson
- Valve type: Slide valve
- Loco brake: Steam
- Train brakes: Steam
- Couplers: Link-and-pin
Performance figures
- Tractive effort: 3,571 lbf (15.88 kN)
Career
- Operators: Central Pacific; Southern Pacific
- Numbers: CP 3; SP 1; SP 1001
- Official name: C. P. Huntington
- First run: April 15, 1864
- Retired: 1914
- Current owner: California State Railroad Museum
- Disposition: Preserved on static display

C. P. Huntington is a 4-2-4RT type steam locomotive on static display at the California State Railroad Museum in Sacramento, California, USA. It is the first locomotive purchased by the Southern Pacific Railroad, carrying that railroad's number 1, and it is named after one of the Big Four who founded it.

== History and career ==
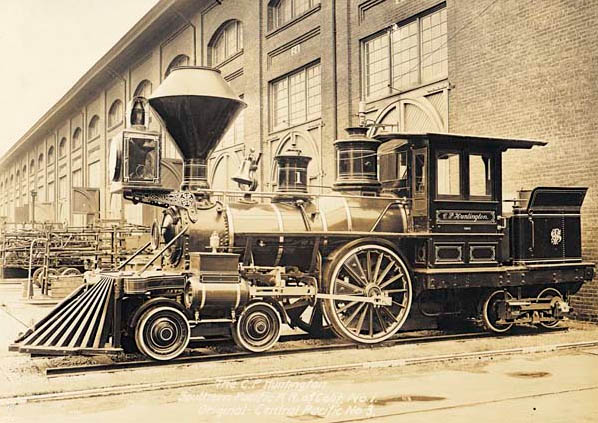
C. P. Huntington after its 1888 rebuild in Sacramento

C. P. Huntington was originally purchased by Central Pacific Railroad (CP) in 1863 as that railroad's number 3, along with its sister engine T. D. Judah (CP no. 4). It was CP's third locomotive after Gov. Stanford (number 1, built by Norris Locomotive Works) and Pacific (number 2, built by Mason Machine Works). The locomotive is named in honor of Collis P. Huntington, the third president of the Southern Pacific Company (parent company of Southern Pacific Railroad). CP used the locomotive beginning on April 15, 1864, during construction of the western portion of the First transcontinental railroad in North America.

Southern Pacific (SP) purchased C. P. Huntington from CP on February 5, 1871, gave it their number 1, and used it in light service in northern California. It was rebuilt twice, first in 1873 with new valves and again in 1888 with a new boiler built by CP's Sacramento shops. In 1888 the locomotive was also put on public display for the first time in Sacramento.

In SP's 1891 renumbering plan, C. P. Huntington was assigned road number 1001. The locomotive was placed in storage for some time until it was rebuilt for use as a lineside weed burner in 1901. Its use as a weed burner proved unsatisfactory and the locomotive was again removed from active service. In 1910, C. P. Huntington was again rebuilt and it was then kept at SP's machine shops where it remained for a few years. The locomotive was nearly scrapped in 1914; it was spared this fate by SP management so that it could be displayed at the Panama–Pacific International Exposition in 1915 after a cosmetic restoration.

On May 3, 1939, C. P. Huntington participated in the grand opening ceremonies for the Los Angeles Union Station. Operating under her own steam, the Huntington was paraded past large, cheering crowds to the newly completed passenger terminal, along with several other engines, including the famous 4-4-0, Virginia & Truckee 22, the Inyo (still painted in Union Pacific livery, from the filming of Cecil B. DeMille's 1939 movie of the same name, which premiered two days later), and Southern Pacific 4120, a massive AC-5 class 4-8-8-2 cab forward. The moment was captured on film by Disney animator and lifelong train enthusiast, Ward Kimball, and may be some of the only known footage of the engine under steam.

Southern Pacific donated the engine to the State of California in 1964. The locomotive was placed on display at the old state fairgrounds on Stockton Boulevard, in Sacramento, where it remained until a 1970 refurbishing at Southern Pacific's Sacramento Shops, when it was placed in the Central Pacific Railroad Passenger Station in Old Sacramento in 1979. In 1981 it was moved into the newly opened California State Railroad Museum, where it now remains on static display.

== Working replicas ==
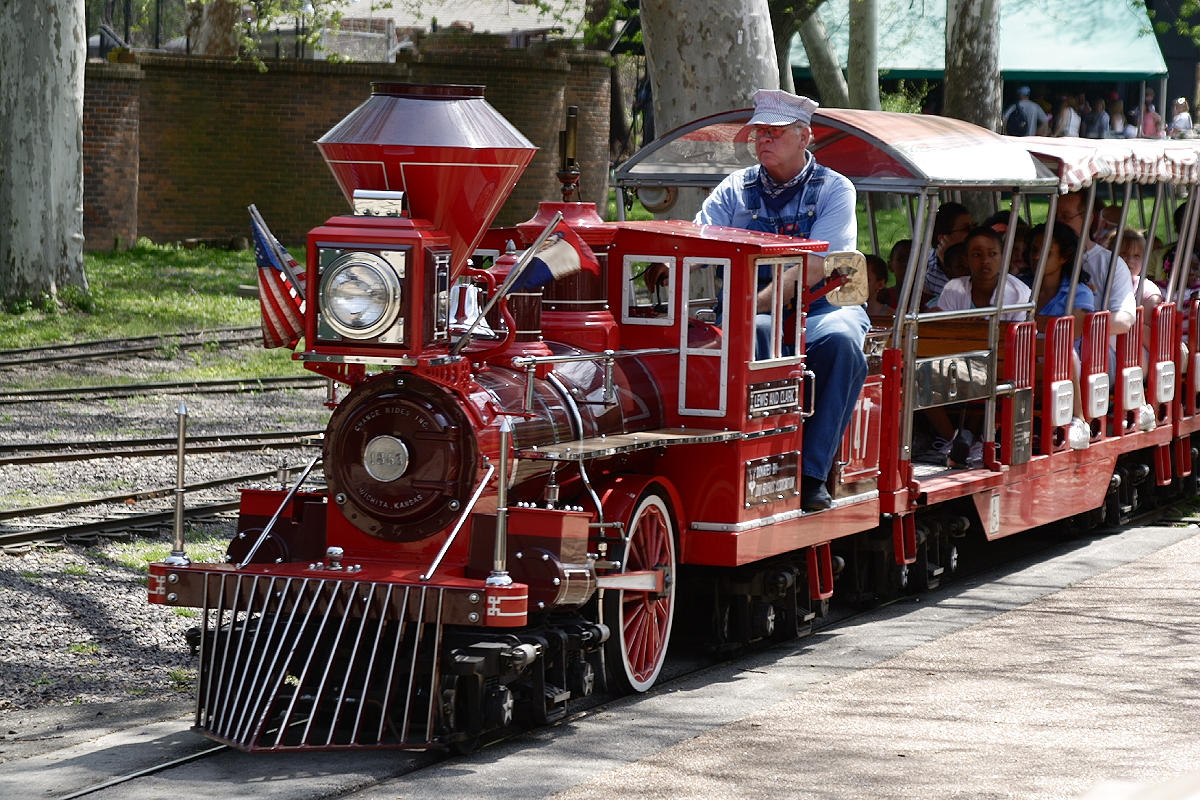
A Chance Rides C. P. Huntington train operating at the Saint Louis Zoo

Chance Rides began to fabricate their 2 ft (610 mm) narrow gauge C. P. Huntington locomotive in 1961. These locomotives can be powered by gas, diesel, propane or electric motors; as of 2025, only the electric model is being offered. Its drive wheels are not powered, but roll on the rails while fake side rods reciprocate in and out of fake cylinders. Power is instead provided by the front and rear trucks. Some owners have chosen to remove the false drive wheels for ease of maintenance.

With over 400 examples built as of 2024, the C. P. Huntington has become the most popular park train since the Allan Herschell Company merged into Chance Industries in 1970 and production of the S-24 Iron Horse train ceased. Many parks have replaced their steam locomotives with C. P. Huntington locomotives since they are easier to maintain and operate. Locomotives and coaches can be customized in a variety of ways.

Additional working replicas of the C. P. Huntington are manufactured by Western Train Co. (formerly Katiland Trains), which also converts older C. P. Huntington locomotives to hydrostatic diesel power.

== In popular culture ==
The unique design of the C. P. Huntington inspired the appearance of The Little Engine That Could in most storybook renderings.
