= Bristol and Exeter Railway 4-4-0ST locomotives =

B&ER 4-4-0ST
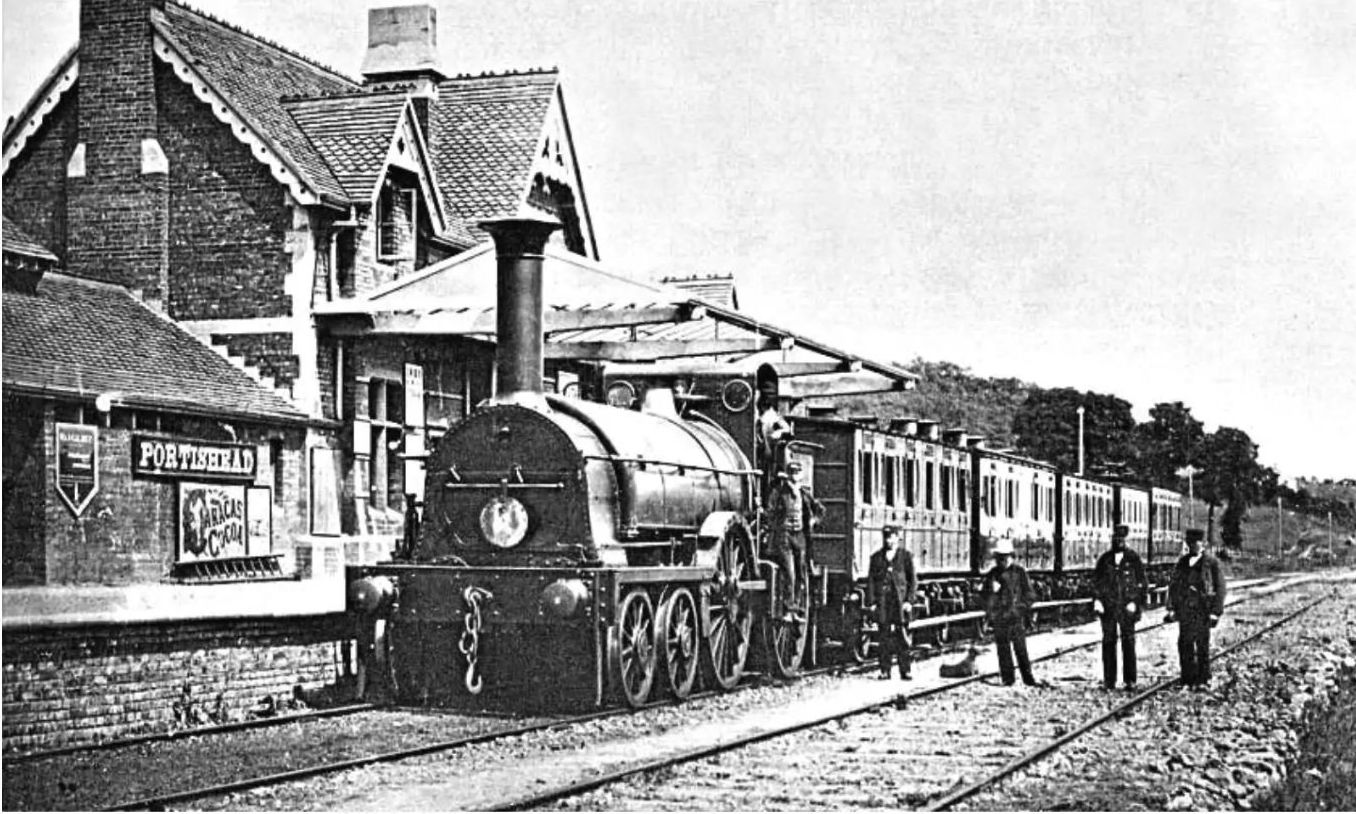
Type and origin
- Power type: Steam
- Builder: various
Specifications
- Configuration
  - Whyte: 4-4-0ST
- Gauge: 7 ft 1/4 in (2,140 mm)
- Leading dia.: 3 ft 6 in (1.07 m)
- Driver dia.: 5 ft 6 in (1.68 m)
- Wheelbase: 18 ft 4 in (5.59 m)
- Cylinder size: 17 in × 24 in (430 mm × 610 mm) (bore × stroke)

The 26 Bristol and Exeter Railway 4-4-0ST locomotives were broad gauge 4-4-0ST steam locomotives. They first entered service in 1855 and the last was withdrawn in 1892. The Bristol and Exeter Railway was amalgamated into the Great Western Railway on 1 January 1876.

The locomotives were built in four batches, each by a different builder, with variations between them, noticeably in the size of the saddle tank.

== List of locomotives ==
=== 1859 Rothwell locomotives ===
Five locomotives built by Rothwell and Company with 1,100-imperial-gallon (5,000 L; 1,300 US gal) gallon saddle tanks and 18-foot-4-inch (5.59 m) wheelbase.

- 47 (1855–1879) GWR No. 2028
- 48 (1855–1879) GWR No. 2029
- 49 (1855–1884) GWR No. 2030
- 50 (1855–1884) GWR No. 2031
- 51 (1855–1882) GWR No. 2032
- 52 (1855–1880) GWR No. 2033

=== 1862 Beyer, Peacock locomotives ===
Four locomotives built by Beyer Peacock with 1,280-imperial-gallon (5,800 L; 1,540 US gal) saddle tanks and 19-foot-5 1/2-inch (5.931 m) wheelbase.

- 61 (1862–1884) GWR No. 2034
- 62 (1862–1886) GWR No. 2035
- 63 (1862–1880) GWR No. 2036
- 64 (1862–1886) GWR No. 2037

=== 1867 Vulcan Foundry locomotives ===
Ten locomotives built by the Vulcan Foundry with 1,280-imperial-gallon (5,800 L; 1,540 US gal) saddle tanks and 19-foot-5 1/2-inch (5.931 m) wheelbase, the same as the Beyer, Peacock locomotives built five years earlier.

- 65 (1867–1880) GWR No. 2038
- 66 (1867–1892) GWR No. 2039
- 67 (1867–1888) GWR No. 2040
- 68 (1867–1880) GWR No. 2041
- 69 (1867–1892) GWR No. 2042
- 70 (1867–1888) GWR No. 2043
- 71 (1867–1882) GWR No. 2044
- 72 (1867–1892) GWR No. 2045
- 73 (1867–1889) GWR No, 2046
- 74 (1867–1892) GWR No. 2047

=== 1872 Avonside locomotives ===
Six locomotives built by the Avonside Engine Company with 1,440-imperial-gallon (6,500 L; 1,730 US gal) saddle tanks and 18-foot-4-inch (5.59 m) wheelbase.

- 85 (1872–1892) GWR No. 2048
- 86 (1872–1892) GWR No. 2049
- 87 (1873–1892) GWR No. 2050
- 88 (1873–1890) GWR No. 2051
- 89 (1873–1892) GWR No. 2052
- 90 (1873–1892) GWR No. 2053

No. 2051 was withdrawn following a fatal collision at Norton Fitzwarren railway station in Somerset while working a special ocean mail train from Plymouth on 11 November 1890.
