= Bristol and Exeter Railway 2-2-2T locomotives =

Bristol & Exeter Railway 2-2-2WT
Type and origin
- Power type: Steam
- Designer: James Pearson
- Builder: R. B. Longridge & Co. (2); E. B. Wilson & Co. (3); Rothwell & Co. (2)
- Build date: 1851 (5), 1859 (2)
- Total produced: 7
Specifications
- Configuration
  - Whyte: 2-2-2WT
  - UIC: 1A1 n2
- Gauge: 7 ft 1/4 in (2,140 mm)
- Leading dia.: 3 ft 6 in (1.067 m)
- Driver dia.: 5 ft 6 in (1.676 m)
- Trailing dia.: 3 ft 6 in (1.067 m)
- Wheelbase: 14 ft 6 in (4.420 m) equally divided
- Water cap.: 30–34: 480 imperial gallons (2,200 L; 580 US gal); 57–58: 550 imperial gallons (2,500 L; 660 US gal)
- Boiler
  - Diameter: 30–34: 3 ft 1 in (0.940 m); 57–58: 3 ft 7 in (1.092 m)
  - Tube plates: 30–34: 9 ft 6 in (2.896 m); 57–58: 9 ft 0 in (2.743 m)
  - Small tubes: 1 3/4 in (44 mm), 30–34: 131 off; 57–58: 179 off
- Cylinders: Two, inside
- Cylinder size: 30–34: 12 1/2 in × 18 in (318 mm × 457 mm); 57–58: 14 1/2 in × 18 in (368 mm × 457 mm)
Career
- Operators: Bristol and Exeter Railway; Great Western Railway
- Numbers: B&ER: 30–34, 57, 58; GWR: 2054–2057
- Withdrawn: 1875–1880
- Disposition: All scrapped

The seven Bristol and Exeter Railway 2-2-2WT locomotives were small 2-2-2 well tank locomotives designed by James Pearson for working branch lines such as those to Tiverton and Clevedon, as well as acting as pilot locomotives at Bristol. The first was delivered in 1851, and the last withdrawn in 1880.

On 1 January 1876, the Bristol and Exeter Railway was amalgamated with the Great Western Railway, after which the surviving locomotives were given new numbers.

- R. B. Longridge and Company
- 30 (1851 – 1876)
- 31 (1851 – 1877) GWR No. 2054
- E. B. Wilson and Company
- 32 (1851 – 1878) GWR No. 2055
- 33 (1851 – 1876)
- 34 (1851 – 1875)
- Rothwell and Company (14½ inch cylinders)
- 57 (1859 – 1877) GWR No. 2056
- 58 (1859 – 1880) GWR No. 2057
