= 4-2-2 =

Locomotive wheel arrangement

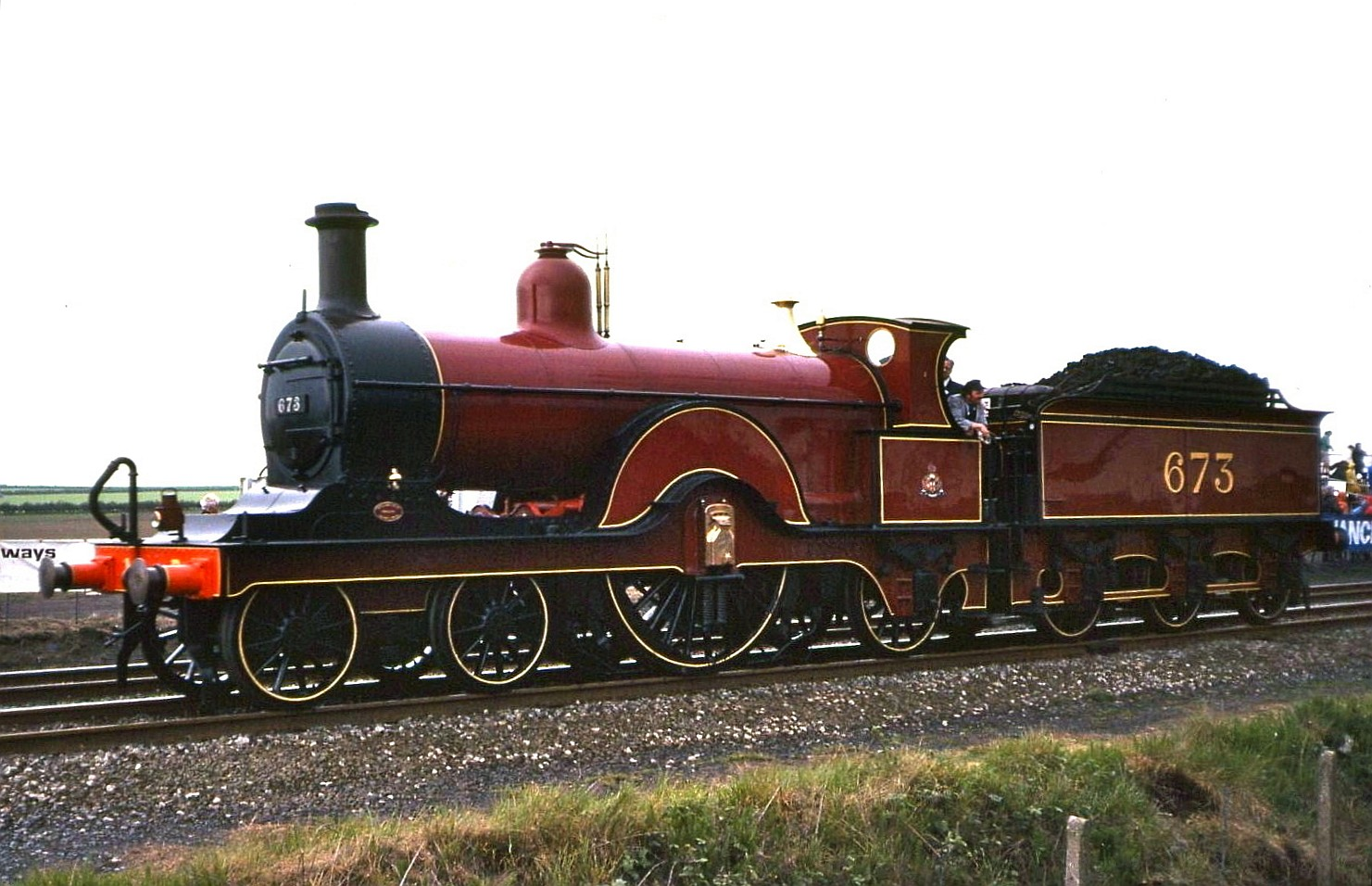
The Midland Railway 115 Class 4-2-2

Under the Whyte notation for the classification of steam locomotives, 4-2-2 represents the wheel arrangement of four leading wheels on two axles, two powered driving wheels on one axle, and two trailing wheels on one axle.

Other equivalent classifications are:

UIC classification: 2A1
French classification: 211
Turkish classification: 14
Swiss classification: 1/4

Like other steam locomotive types with single pairs of driving wheels, they were also known as singles.

== History ==
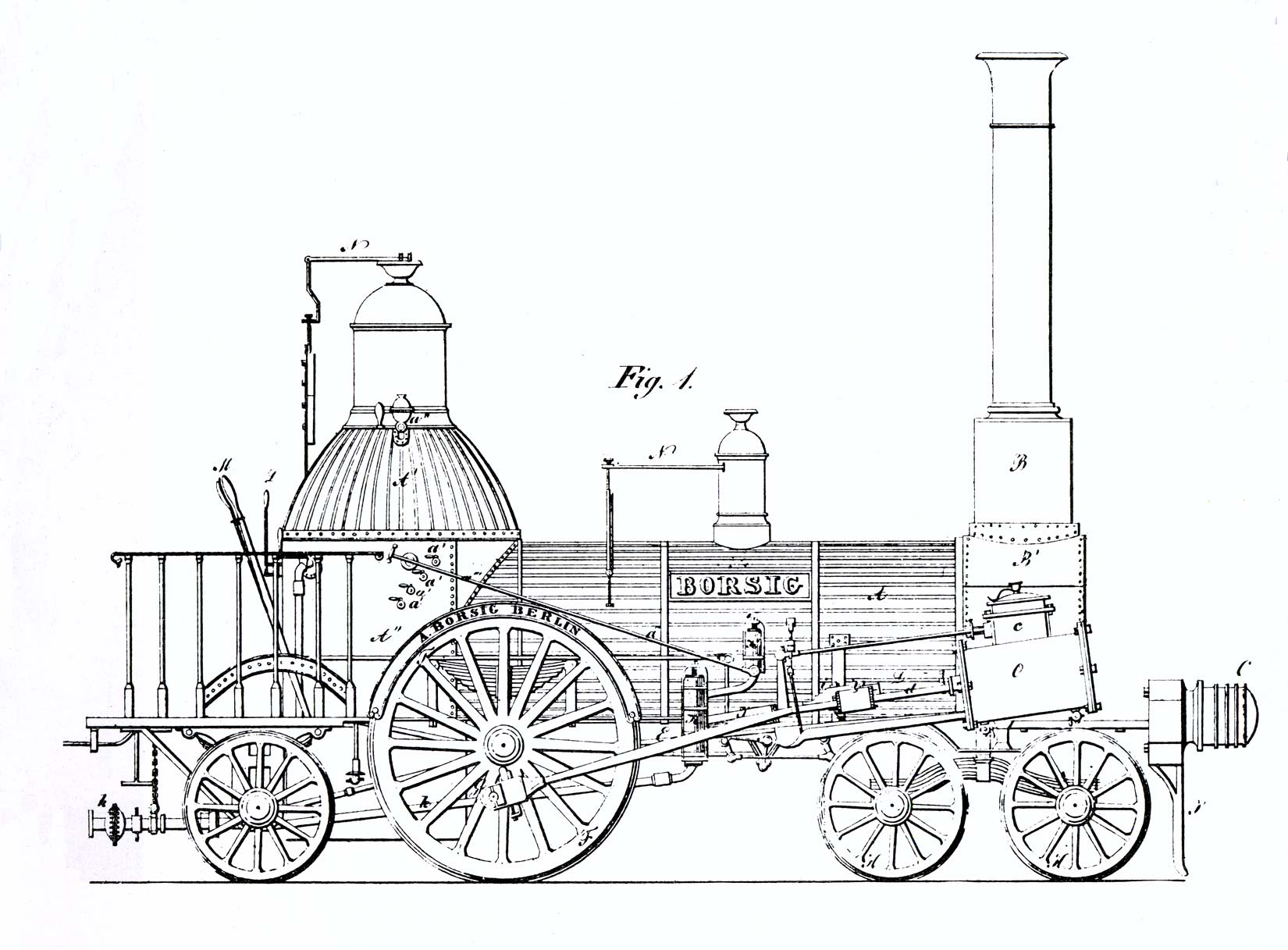
Technical drawing of the first Borsig locomotive

The 4-2-2 configuration offered designers eight wheels to spread the weight of a larger locomotive, but prior to the bogies (invented in the 1830s) becoming popular, created a long rigid wheelbase with limited adhesion. As a result, the type was relatively rare until the 1870s. The first steam locomotive made by Borsig of Berlin in 1841, the Borsig No 1, was a 4-2-2, but the company quickly reverted to the more common 2-2-2 configuration.

=== UK developments ===
The London and North Western Railway No. 3020 Cornwall was built as 4-2-2 at Crewe Works in 1847, but was extensively rebuilt, and converted to a 2-2-2 in 1858.

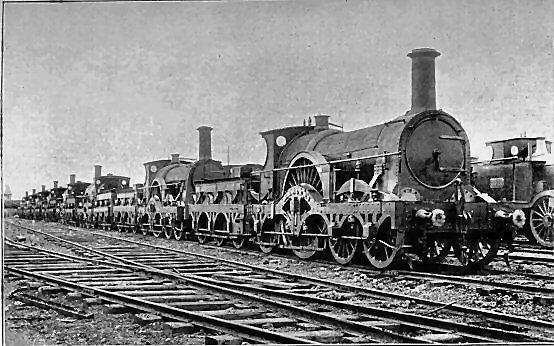
Iron Duke class engines waiting to be scrapped

The one area where the type proved to be useful was on broad gauge locomotives, where sharp bends were less of an issue. Daniel Gooch built 29 examples of his Iron Duke express locomotive class for the Great Western Railway between 1847 and 1855. They had an 8 ft (2.4 m) diameter driving wheel size. Twenty examples of a similar design were built for the Bristol and Exeter Railway after 1849, by Stothert & Slaughter in Bristol. Because both sets of leading wheels are mounted independently in the frames in these classes, they are sometimes described as (2-2)-2-2 rather than 4-2-2.

The first 4-2-2 to have a bogie was built by Archibald Sturrock of the Great Northern Railway (GNR) in 1853. This had 7 ft 6 in (2.286 m) flangeless driving wheels, and was only moderately successful, having a tendency to derail. By the 1870s, improved design of bogies giving more flexibility enabled designers to create fast standard gauge express passenger locomotives of this type. On the GNR, Patrick Stirling built 53 examples with outside cylinders at Doncaster Works between 1870 and 1895, for use on the East Coast Main Line between London King's Cross and York. They ran at an average speed of more than 60 mph (97 km/h) during the Race to the North, and were called eight-footers because of the driving wheel, that was more than 8 ft (2.4 m) in diameter. Stirling's successor Henry Ivatt built a further twelve singles between 1898 and 1901 before moving on to larger 4-4-2 designs.

The attraction of the 'single' (4-2-2 or otherwise) was that, thanks to the 'gearing' effect of the large single driving wheels, a locomotive could obtain high speeds while the operating speed of the engine's pistons and valve gear remained relatively low. This was important because of the relatively unsophisticated lubrication systems available at the time, with many of the parts of the engine's motion requiring to be 'oiled round' with the locomotive stationary before and after a run, or on longer trips by one of the crew taking to the running board to oil the required parts while on the move. Low piston speed also meant that the steam demand on the boiler would be relatively low, allowing a smaller, lighter boiler.

Before the development of the 'large boiler' designs in the 1890s, many boilers could not sustain the steam supply required of a small-wheeled locomotive operating at speed, thus requiring the large driving wheels of a single. At 70 mph (110 km/h), an 'eight-footer' single's driving wheels would be revolving at 245 revolutions per minute, opposed to the 327 revolutions of the driving wheels of a 'six-footer'. A locomotive with coupled wheels also suffered extra rolling resistance from the presence of coupling rods between the driving wheels which incurred a slight but measurable resistance arising from the small variances in the diameter of the driving wheels that were nominally of the same size. This meant that without the coupling rods, for a given locomotive speed the driving wheels would turn at very slightly different rate, but the coupling rods and the axles forced the driving wheels to turn at the same speed, with the added work being incurred as a binding force in the coupling rod bearings. Aside from this force, the coupling rod bearings themselves were a source of rolling resistance. Additionally, each driving axle of a locomotive had to be supported on large plain bearings, with required further lubrication, introducing a potential point of mechanical failure through overheating and a considerable source of friction. With only one driving axle, a 'single' had much less rolling resistance than a four-coupled engine, requiring less steam to achieve a given speed and also being more free-running when coasting downhill.

The 4-2-2 wheel arrangement had other specific advantages - the front bogie supported the weight of large cylinders and a long boiler which could exceed the load limits on a single front axle while also providing a superior stability and cornering at high speeds. Without restriction from a rear driving axle and wheels, a wide and deep firebox could be used, carried by the small single trailing axle, which provided good steam-making properties and a large ashpan making these locomotives suitable for running long distances at high speeds.

The Stirling 'eight-footers' were very successful, but were best suited to the predominantly straight and flat GNR main line in Cambridgeshire and the Vale of York. Other railways slowly replaced their original 'singles' with 4-4-0 locomotives that offered better traction at the cost of ultimate speed. However, in 1886 Francis Holt, manager at the Derby Works of the Midland Railway invented a practical form of steam sanding gear which allowed locomotive crews to quickly and effectively stop wheelspin. This led to the Midland reviving the 'single' in the form of the distinctive inside-cylinder "Spinners"; eighty-five were built to five designs by Samuel Waite Johnson between 1887 and 1900. One 115 class, No. 673, survives at the National Railway Museum in York. Concurrent with Holt's invention was the so-called Race to the North, when groups of railway companies on the East Coast and West Coast routes between London and Edinburgh competed with each for the fastest journey times. For its portion of the West Coast route, the Caledonian Railway used its unique 4-2-2, No. 123. This had been built in 1885 as a showpiece for the 1886 world's fair in Edinburgh rather than to fulfil a traffic need for the railway, and so had used the now-unfashionable 4-2-2 'Single' layout. But when pressed into service during the Race to the North, No. 123's high speed performance and reliability made other locomotive engineers reconsider the advantages of the single-driver engine, especially when joined with the new steam-sander (No. 123 had a similar sanding system working by compressed air).

These factors lead to a resurgence of interest in the 'single' for fast express passenger work in the 1880s and 1890s. William Dean of the Great Western Railway built fifty examples of the standard gauge 3031 Achilles Class from 1893 to 1899. No. 3065 Duke of Connaught contributed to the record-breaking run of the Ocean Mail express train from Plymouth to Paddington in 227 minutes on 9 May 1904, when it took over the train at Bristol from No 3440 City of Truro and completed the journey to Paddington in 99 minutes 46 seconds. By 1900, average train loads had grown beyond the capability of even a sander-fitted 'single' and their development was stopped. On the GNR, Stirling's famous 'eight-footers' required double heading with 4-4-0s before they were replaced by the 'Klondyke' 4-4-2 engines designed by Henry Ivatt, while on the Midland Railway Samuel Johnson developed a powerful compound 4-4-0 to replace his 'Spinners'.

Other notable UK examples of the 4-2-2 include the GER Class P43, which was an early oil-burning engine, developed by the pioneer of oil-boilers, James Holden. The last British 'single' to be designed was the Class 13 of the Great Central Railway, designed by Harry Pollitt in 1900 for work on the company's new main line to London. Ivatt Class A5 singles of the GNR, designed before the Great Central engines, continued to enter service during 1901, being the last of their type to take to the rails in Britain.

=== US developments ===
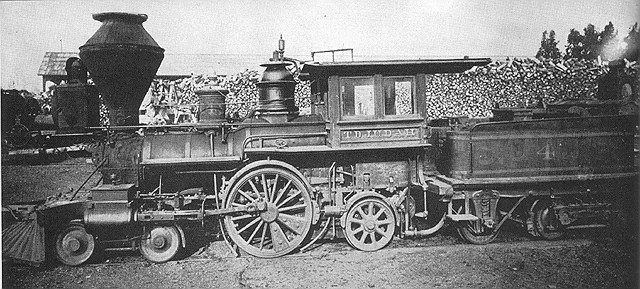
T. D. Judah, a locomotive rebuilt as a 4-2-2 by Central Pacific Railroad.

The T. D. Judah locomotive was built as a 4-2-4 by the Cooke Locomotive and Machine Works in 1863. It was purchased for use on the Central Pacific Railroad and was rebuilt as a 4-2-2 in 1872.

By 1900, typical loads on express trains had grown beyond the capabilities of 4-2-2 locomotives and the configuration was superseded by the 4-4-2.

=== Asia ===
In 1910, the British locomotive manufacturer Kerr, Stuart and Company produced four 4-2-2 locomotives, weighing 120 tons and with 7 ft driving wheels, for the Shanghai–Nanjing railway. These were the last recorded 'singles' built and almost certainly the largest.
