= Bristol and Exeter Railway 4-2-2 locomotives =

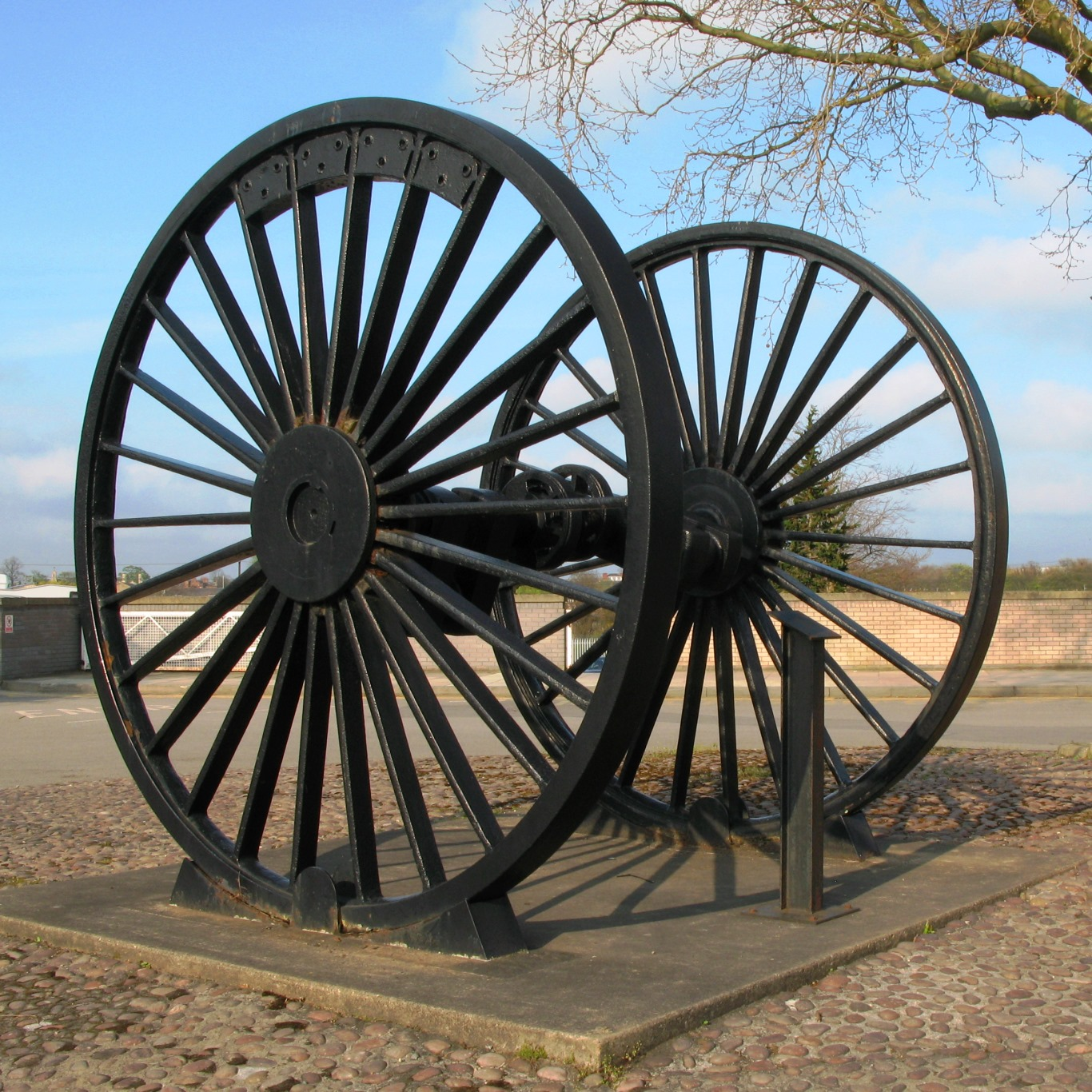
The 8 feet (2.4 m) driving wheels of locomotive 2002 are preserved at the National Railway Museum in York

The 20 Bristol and Exeter Railway 4-2-2 locomotives were broad gauge 4-2-2 express steam locomotives built for the Bristol and Exeter Railway by the Stothert and Slaughter in Bristol. The first entered service in 1849. The Bristol and Exeter Railway was amalgamated into the Great Western Railway on 1 January 1876 and eight 4-2-2s survived at this time, the last being withdrawn in 1889.

Three of the infamous 4-2-4T locomotives were rebuilt by the Great Western Railway in 1877 as 4-2-2 tender locomotives.

== List of locomotives ==
=== 1849 batch ===
B&ER 4-2-2
Type and origin
- Power type: Steam
- Designer: Daniel Gooch
- Builder: Stothert and Slaughter
Specifications
- Configuration
  - Whyte: 4-2-2
- Gauge: 7 ft 1/4 in (2,140 mm)
- Leading dia.: 4 ft 3 in (1.30 m)
- Driver dia.: 7 ft 6 in (2.29 m)
- Wheelbase: 18 ft 2 1/2 in (5.550 m)
- Cylinder size: 16 1/2 in × 24 in (420 mm × 610 mm) (bore × stroke) (later 18 in (460 mm) stroke)

The Bristol and Exeter Railway's first express passenger locomotives, similar in appearance to the GWR Iron Duke Class.

- 1 (1849 – 1875)
- 2 (1849 – 1872)
- 3 (1849 – 1874)
- 4 (1849 – 1871)
- 5 (1849 – 1871)
- 6 (1849 – 1870)
- 7 (1849 – 1885) GWR No. 2007
- 8 (1849 – 1872)
- 9 (1849 – 1889) GWR No. 2008
- 10 (1849 – 1888) GWR No. 2009
- 11 (1849 – 1874)
- 12 (1849 – 1862)
- 13 (1849 – 1878) GWR No. 2010
- 14 (1849 – 1870)
- 15 (1849 – 1888) GWR No. 2011
- 16 (1849 – 1875)
- 17 (1849 – 1885) GWR No. 2012
- 18 (1849 – 1880) GWR No. 2013
- 19 (1849 – 1888) GWR No. 2014
- 20 (1849 – 1874)

=== GWR 4-2-2 rebuilds ===
GWR 2001 class
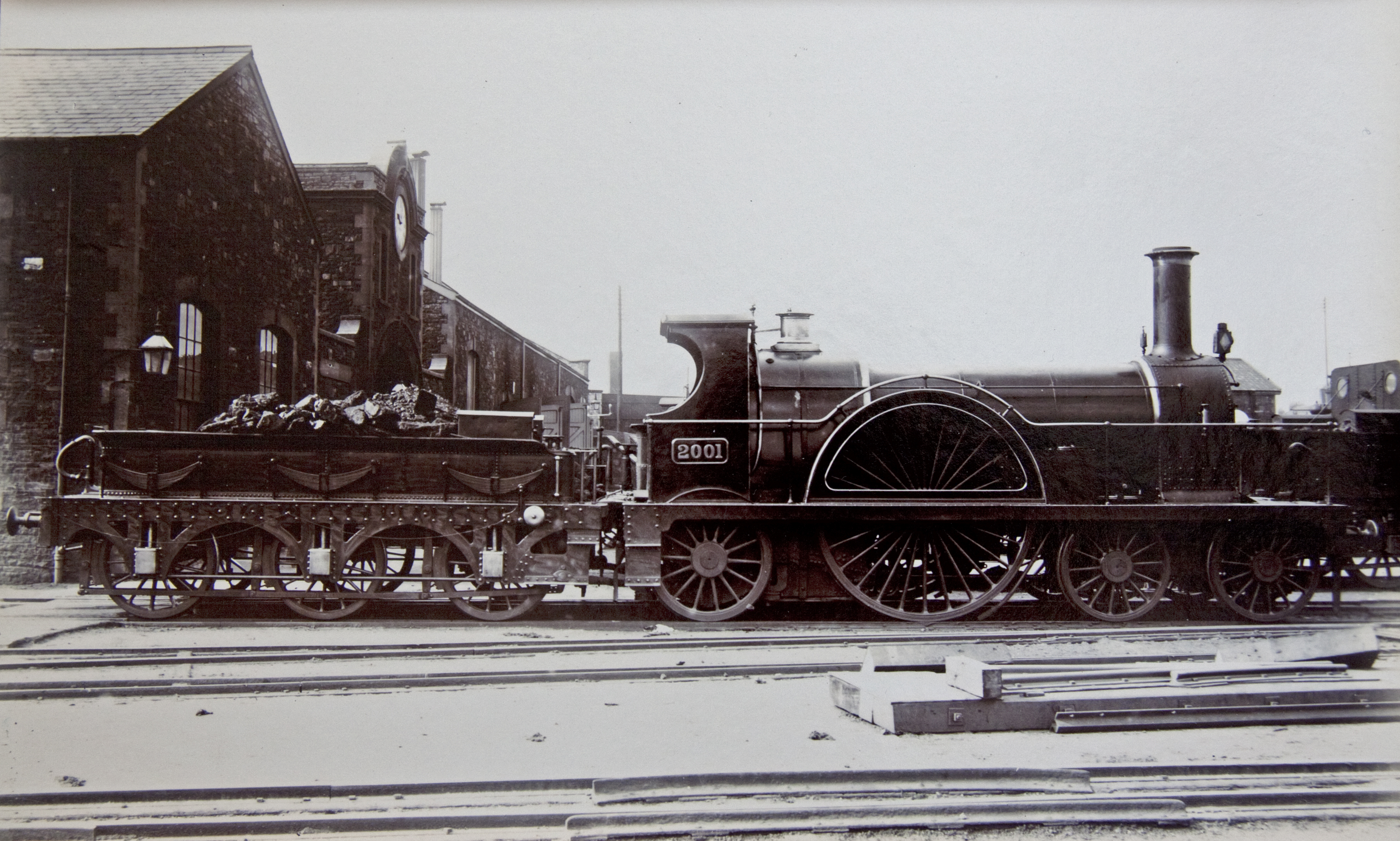
Type and origin
- Power type: Steam
- Designer: Joseph Armstrong
- Builder: Great Western Railway
Specifications
- Configuration
  - Whyte: 4-2-2
- Gauge: 7 ft 1/4 in (2,140 mm)
- Leading dia.: 4 ft 0 in (1.22 m)
- Driver dia.: 8 ft 0 in (2.44 m)
- Trailing dia.: 4 ft 6 in (1.37 m)

Following rebuilding as 4-2-2 tender locomotives at Swindon, the three remaining 8 feet 10 inch 4-2-4T locomotives had slightly smaller 8 feet diameter driving wheels and worked alongside the rigid-framed GWR Rover class and the remaining 1849-built ex-Bristol and Exeter Railway 4-2-2 locomotives on express passenger trains.

- 2001 (1877 – 1889) Previously B&ER 42/GWR 2004)
- 2002 (1877 – 1890)
- 2003 (1877 – 1884)
