= 4-2-4T =

Tank locomotive wheel arrangement

4-2-4

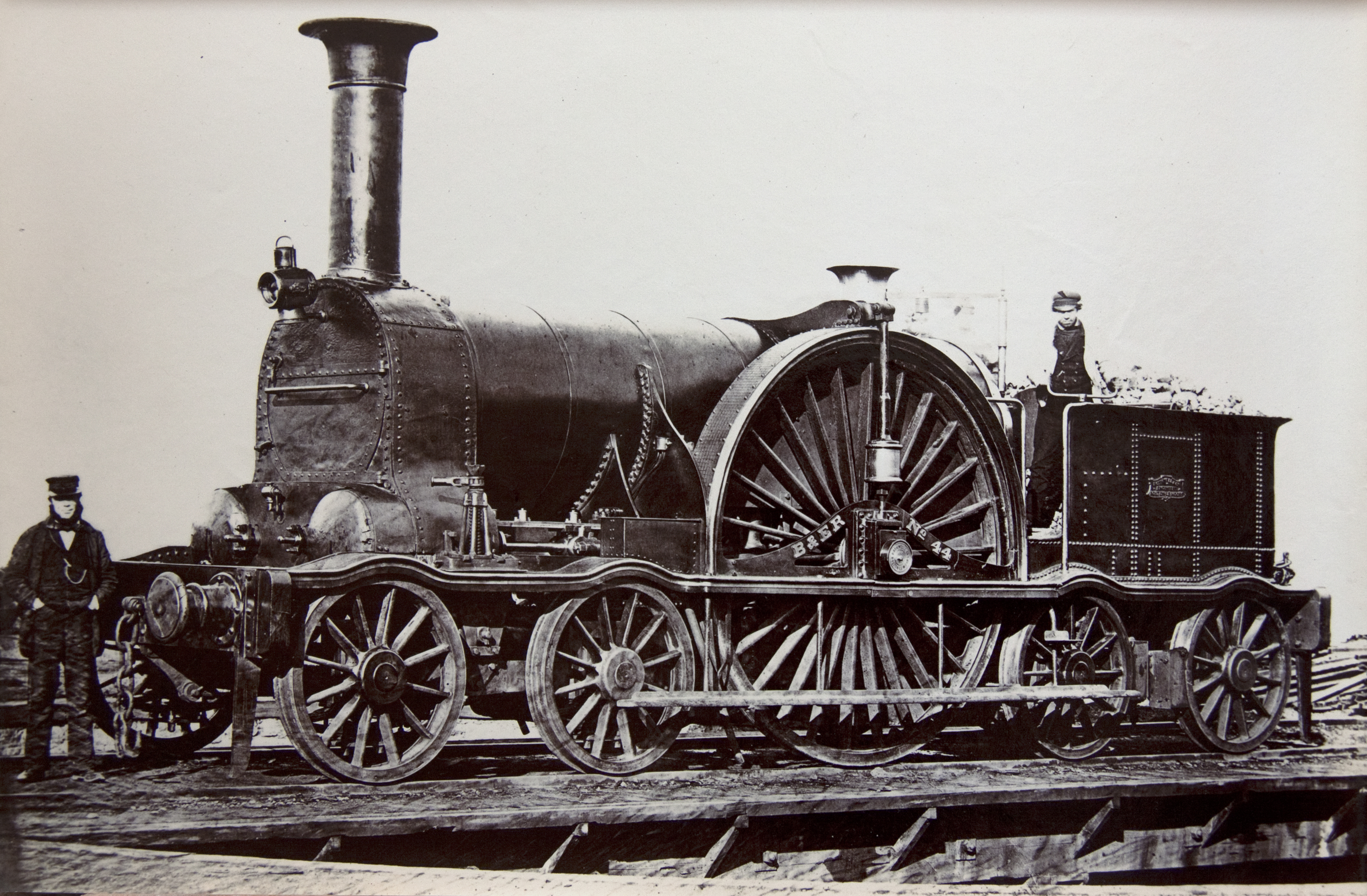
- Pearson 4-2-4T no. 44 of the Bristol and Exeter Railway, c. 1854
Equivalent classifications
- UIC class: 2A2
- French class: 212
- Turkish class: 15
- Swiss class: 1/5
- Russian class: 2-1-2
First known tank engine version
- First use: 1853
- Country: United Kingdom
- Locomotive: Pearson 4-2-4T
- Railway: Bristol and Exeter Railway
- Designer: James Pearson
- Builder: Bristol and Exeter Railway

Under the Whyte notation for the classification of steam locomotives, 4-2-4 represents the wheel arrangement of four leading wheels on two axles, two powered driving wheels on one axle, and four trailing wheels on two axles.

The configuration was only used for tank engines, which is noted by adding letter suffixes to the configuration, such as 4-2-4T for a conventional side-tank locomotive, 4-2-4ST for a saddle-tank locomotive, 4-2-4WT for a well-tank locomotive and 4-2-4RT for a rack-equipped tank locomotive.

== Overview ==
This wheel arrangement was only used on various tank locomotive configurations. Eight 4-2-4 well- and back-tank locomotives which entered service on the Bristol and Exeter Railway in 1853 appear to have been the first with this wheel arrangement. The engine was designed by James Pearson, the railway company's engineer, and featured single large flangeless driving wheels between two supporting four-wheeled bogies. The water was carried in both well- and back-tanks, leaving the boilers exposed in the same way as on most tender locomotives.

== Usage ==
=== United Kingdom ===
The first eight known 4-2-4T locomotives entered service on the broad gauge Bristol and Exeter Railway in 1853 and 1854, numbered in the range from 39 to 46. They had 9 feet (2,743 millimetres) diameter flangeless driving wheels, supported by leading and trailing two-axle bogies. The water was carried in both well- and back-tanks. Two more engines were built in 1859 and 1862, but with much smaller 7 feet 6 inches (2,286 millimetres) diameter driving wheels.

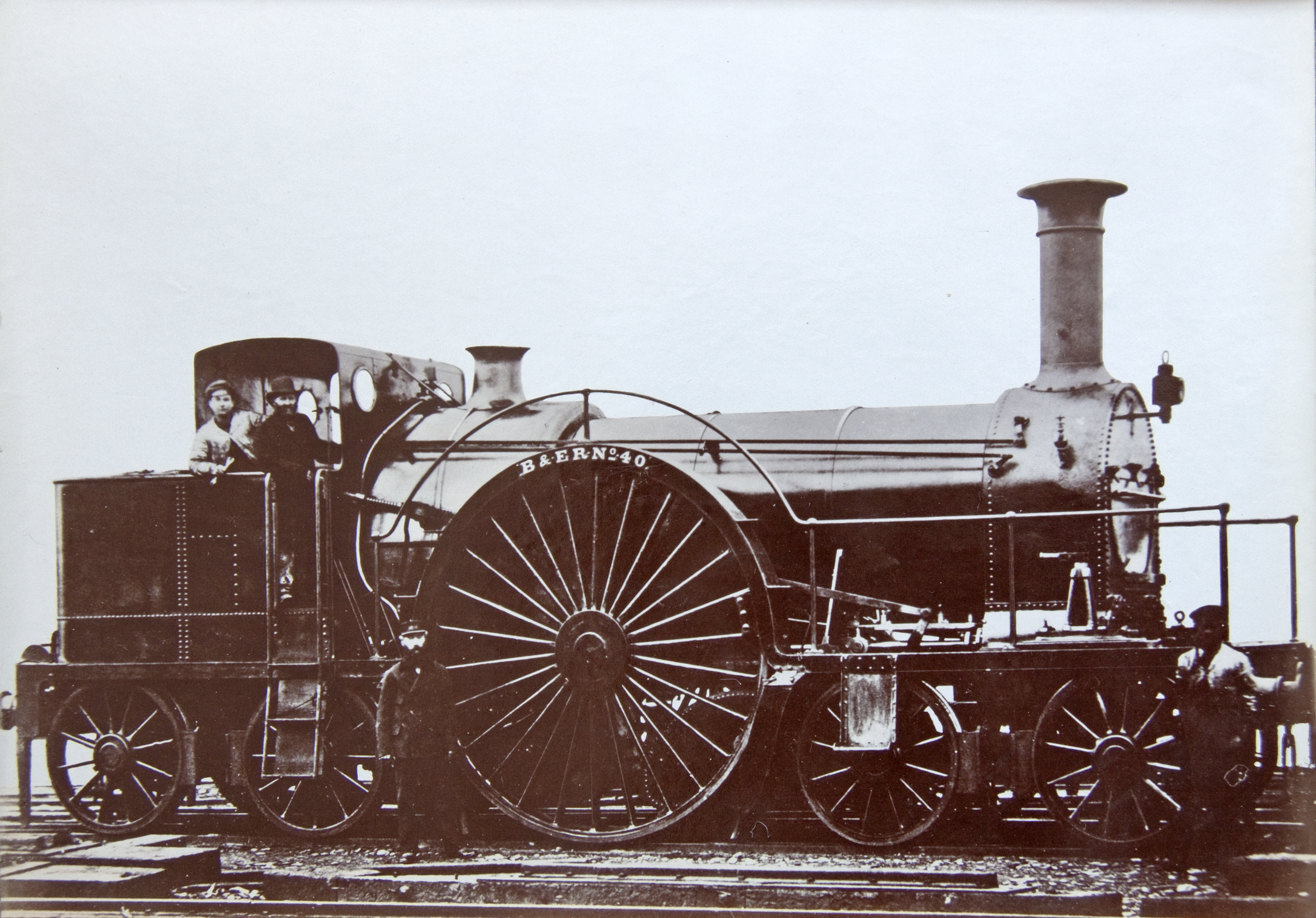
The second B&ER No. 40 of 1873

Between 1869 and 1873, new locomotives were built to replace four of the original 9 feet (2,743 millimetres) diameter driving wheeled engines, re-using the engine numbers of the locomotives being replaced. These four replacement engines had slightly smaller, 8 feet 10 inches (2,692 millimetres), diameter driving wheels.

In 1881, this wheel arrangement was also used by the Great Western Railway on William Dean's experimental locomotive No. 9. Since it was so prone to derailing as to be unable to be moved from the workshops where it was built, it did no work and was rebuilt to a 2-2-2 tender locomotive in 1884. Dugald Drummond of the London and South Western Railway built a 4-2-4T F9 class combined locomotive and inspection saloon in 1899. It was little used after Drummond's death in 1912.

=== United States ===
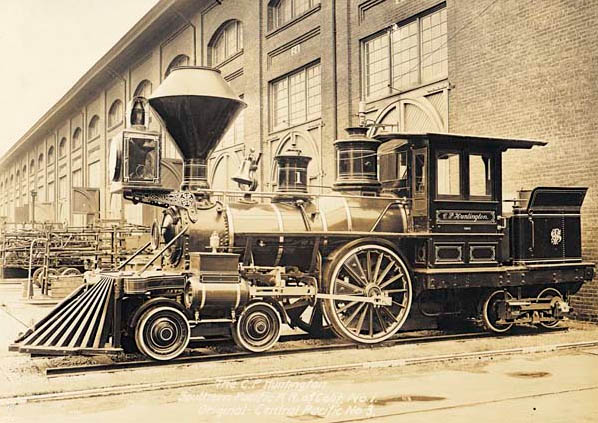
The C.P. Huntington

The engine C. P. Huntington was one of three identical 4-2-4 tank locomotives. They were the first locomotives to be purchased by Central Pacific Railroad in 1863, for use on light commuter services in the Sacramento area. The locomotives had serious shortcomings. The single driving axle did not carry the full weight of the engine's rear end due to the trailing truck and, in addition to being too light, it therefore lacked adhesion to reliably pull trains, especially on gradients. The short water tank on the Forney-type frame prevented the locomotives from travelling any moderate distance without consuming all of their water. As a result, these locomotives were only used when absolutely necessary.

In 1863, a sister engine, the T. D. Judah, was built by the Cooke Locomotive Works for a railroad which was unable to pay for it and was purchased by the Central Pacific Railroad. This locomotive was rebuilt to a 4-2-2 wheel arrangement in 1872.

=== South Africa ===
In 1923, the South African Railways (SAR) conducted trials with a prototype petrol-paraffin powered road-rail tractor and, in 1924, placed at least two Dutton steam rail tractors in service on the new 2 ft (610 mm) narrow gauge line between Naboomspruit and Singlewood in Transvaal. One of the latter had a 4-2-4 wheel arrangement.

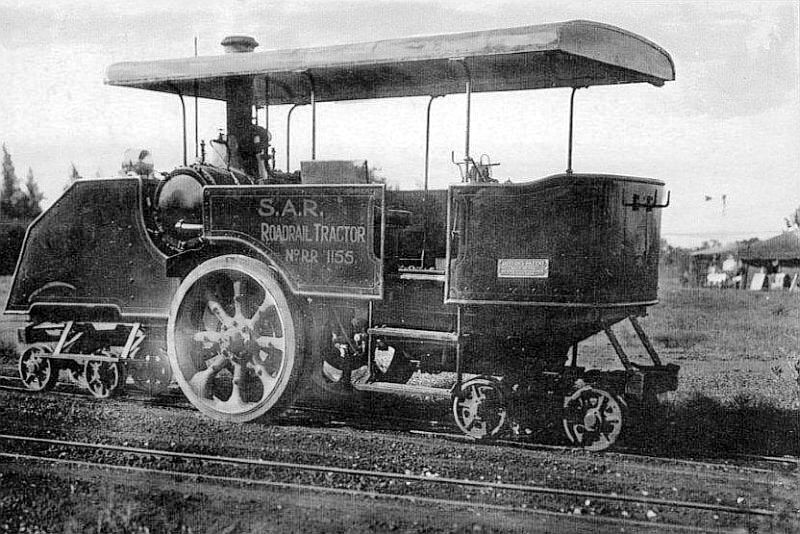
Dutton rail-only tractor no. RR1155, c. 1924

The designer, Major Frank Dutton, SAR Signal Engineer and the Motor Transport Superintendent, argued that a rubber tyre in contact with a hard road would be better at transferring tractive power than a steel wheel on steel rail. At least two Dutton Rail Tractors were built, both steam-powered and both rebuilt by the Britannia Engineering Works of Johannesburg from Yorkshire steam tractors.

The second Dutton tractor, no. RR1155, was a rail-only vehicle. It had a bogie at either end with the single pair of driving wheels on a differential axle in the centre. It was arranged for forward and reverse movement at all speeds, but it could only be used on the rails. Since, on occasion, the vehicle had to be transported by road, its construction was such that it could be readily disassembled into more easily transportable units, to be moved on road wheels to a workshop or for transfer of any other kind. In service, the tractor was often equipped with a water tank tender loaded with additional bags of coal on its running boards.

== In fiction ==
The Little Blue Engine from the original 1906 book The Little Engine That Could was a Forney locomotive with this wheel arrangement. Later books often show the Little Blue Engine in a shape similar to Central Pacific's C. P. Huntington.

== Preserved examples and replicas ==
- Central Pacific no.3 C. P. Huntington built in October 1863 is on display at California State Railroad Museum
