= GWR Swindon Class =

Class of 14 British 0-6-0 locomotives

Swindon
Type and origin
- Power type: Steam
- Designer: Joseph Armstrong
- Builder: Great Western Railway
Specifications
- Configuration
  - Whyte: 0-6-0
- Gauge: 7 ft 1/4 in (2,140 mm)
- Driver dia.: 5 ft 0 in (1.524 m)
- Wheelbase: 15 ft 6 in (4.724 m)
- Cylinder size: 17 in × 24 in (432 mm × 610 mm) dia × stroke
Career
- Operators: Great Western Railway
- Class: Swindon

The Great Western Railway Swindon Class were 14 broad gauge 0-6-0 locomotives built for goods train work. The first entered service in 1866 and the last was withdrawn in 1892. They were sold to the Bristol and Exeter Railway in the 1870s but returned to the Great Western Railway in 1876 when the companies were amalgamated.

== History ==
The locomotives entered service between November 1865 and March 1866, and were withdrawn between June 1887 and the end of the GWR broad gauge in May 1892. The entire class was sold to the Bristol and Exeter Railway between July 1872 and September 1874 and were numbered 96-109, but returned to the GWR when that railway and the B&ER amalgamated on 1 January 1876. The locomotives were then renumbered 2077-2090; their names were not restored. The first locomotives was withdrawn in 1887 but one remained in service until the end of the broad gauge in 1892.

== Locomotives ==
List of locomotives
GWR Name	Into service	Sold to B&ER	B&ER number	1876 GWR number	Withdrawn	Origin of name
Bath	Jan 1866	Mar 1874	105	2086	Jun 1888	Bath is a Georgian city 11 1/2 miles (18.5 km) east of Bristol which was reached by the Great Western Railway on 31 August 1840.
Birmingham	Feb 1866	Aug 1873	103	2084	Jun 1889	Birmingham, city in the Midlands, which was served by broad gauge trains from 1 October 1851.
Bristol	Dec 1865	Jul 1873	101	2082	Oct 1888	Bristol, the western terminus of the railway.
Chester	Mar 1866	Apr 1873	98	2079	Apr 1887	Chester never saw broad gauge trains but was served by the Great Western Railway from 1 September 1854 when it absorbed the Shrewsbury and Chester Railway.
Gloucester	Mar 1866	Jul 1873	102	2083	Dec 1891	Gloucester was reached over the Cheltenham and Great Western Union Railway from Swindon on 12 March 1845.
Hereford	Mar 1866	Jul 1872	97	2078	Oct 1888	Hereford is an English city near the Welsh border, reached on 2 June 1855 by the Hereford, Ross and Gloucester Railway.
London	Dec 1865	Jun 1873	100	2081	Oct 1888	London, the city from where the railway started.
Newport	Mar 1866	May 1874	106	2087	Jun 1889	Newport is on the South Wales Railway which opened on 18 June 1850.
Oxford	Feb 1866	Jul 1874	108	2089	Dec 1889	Oxford, home to many universities, was served by a branch line from Didcot Junction from 12 June 1844.
Reading	Feb 1866	May 1874	107	2088	May 1892	Reading, a large town 35 3/4 miles (57.5 km) from London.
Shrewsbury	Mar 1866	Jul 1872	96	2077	Feb 1887 (Note: Shrewsbury was taken out of service by March 1886 for rebuilding but was removed from the stock list in February 1877 without having returned to service.)	Shrewsbury never saw broad gauge trains but was served by the Great Western Railway from 1 September 1854 when it absorbed the Shrewsbury and Birmingham Railway.>
Swindon	Nov 1865	Sep 1874	109	2090	Nov 1888	Swindon, the town two-thirds of the way along the Great Western Railway, where the company built its workshops.
Windsor	Jan 1866	Apr 1873	99	2080	Jan 1889	Windsor is the seat of the Royal Family near London and was served by a branch line from Slough that opened on 8 October 1849.
Wolverhampton	Feb 1866	Feb 1874	104	2085	Dec 1889	Wolverhampton is in the Midlands and home to the Great Western's Northern Division workshops. It was served by broad gauge trains from 14 November 1854.
