= James Pearson (engineer) =

British railway engineer (1820–1891)

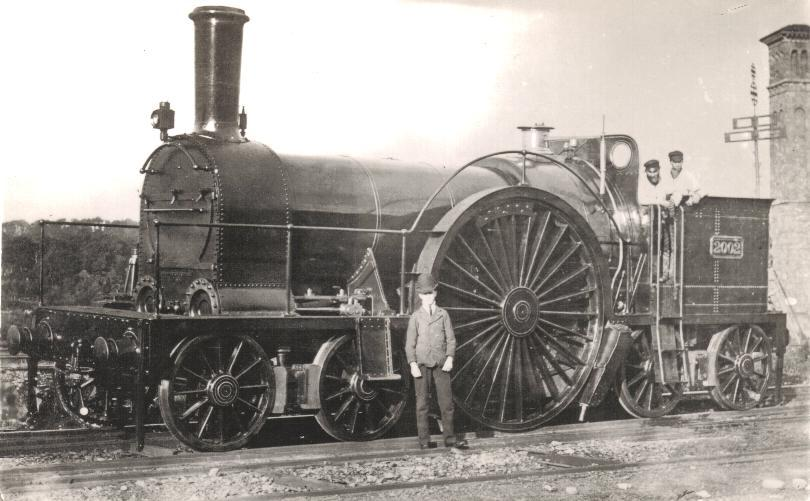
A Pearson-designed 4-2-4T locomotive

James Pearson (c. 1820 – 30 August 1891) was a 19th-century English railway engineer. He is best remembered as the designer of the distinctive Bristol and Exeter Railway 4-2-4T locomotives.

== Career ==
=== South Devon Railway ===
Pearson was the engineer responsible for the daily operations of Isambard Kingdom Brunel's ill-fated atmospheric equipment on the South Devon Railway. Trains only ran in service from 13 September 1847 to 9 September 1848, but he was retained while the equipment was disposed of.

=== Bristol and Exeter Railway ===
In May 1850 he became the Bristol and Exeter Railway's Locomotive Engineer. Under his control the railway set up new locomotive works at Bristol Temple Meads. These opened in 1851 and built most of the railway's new broad gauge locomotives from 1859.

== Locomotives designs ==
The most significant locomotives designed by James Pearson were:

- 1851 Bristol and Exeter Railway 2-2-2T locomotives – 7 small tank locomotives
- 1854 Bristol and Exeter Railway 4-2-4T locomotives – 8 locomotives with 9 feet wheels
- 1855 Bristol and Exeter Railway 4-4-0ST locomotives – 26 saddle tank locomotives
- 1856 Bristol and Exeter Railway 0-6-0 locomotives – 6 goods locomotives
- 1859 Bristol and Exeter Railway 4-2-4T locomotives – 2 locomotives with 7 feet 6 inch wheels
- 1868 Bristol and Exeter Railway 4-2-4T locomotives – 4 locomotives with 8 feet 10 inch wheels
- 1870 Bristol and Exeter Railway 2-4-0 locomotives – 10 passenger locomotives
- 1874 Bristol and Exeter Railway 2-4-0 locomotives – 3 convertible passenger locomotives

== Personal life and death ==
Pearson married Jessy Agnes Mudge, eldest daughter of John Mudge, on 26 December 1850 at Brampford Speke, Devon. He died on 30 August 1891, aged 71, at his home in Gordon Road, West Ealing.

== See also ==
- South Devon Railway engine houses

== Bibliography ==
- Reed, P. J. T. (February 1953). White, D. E. (ed.). The Locomotives of the Great Western Railway, Part 2: Broad Gauge. Kenilworth: RCTS. ISBN 0-901115-32-0. OCLC 650490992.
- Kay, Peter (1991). Exeter - Newton Abbot: A Railway History. Sheffield: Platform 5 Publishing. ISBN 1-872524-42-7.
- MacDermot, E T (1931). History of the Great Western Railway, Volume 2. London: Great Western Railway.
