= Rothwell, Hick and Rothwell =

Former engineering company in Bolton, England

- Company type: General Partnership
- Industry: Engineering; Heavy industry
- Predecessor: Smalley, Thwaites & Co.
- Founded: 1822
- Founder: Peter Rothwell
- Defunct: 1864
- Fate: Closure
- Successor: Rothwell, Hick & Co. Rothwell & Co. Bolton Iron and Steel Co. Henry Bessemer & Co.
- Headquarters: Union Foundry, Black Horse Street, Bolton, United Kingdom of Great Britain and Ireland
- Key people: Benjamin Hick; Peter Rothwell Jr. Benjamin Cubitt

Rothwell, Hick and Rothwell was an engineering company in Bolton, England. Set up in 1822, the partners became interested in the production of steam locomotives after the Rainhill Trials. The company's first engine was Union, a vertical boiler, 2-2-0 with horizontal cylinders for the Bolton and Leigh Railway of which Hick and Rothwell were promoters and original shareholders, followed by three more locomotives the following year for American railways.

== Rothwell and Company ==
In 1832, Benjamin Hick left to set up his own business, B. Hick & Sons, to be replaced by Benjamin Cubitt, (younger brother of William Cubitt) from Fenton, Murray and Jackson. The firm then became Rothwell and Company. A further order for America was fulfilled in 1833, then for a couple of years the firm was occupied with pumps and stationary engines.

== Locomotives, steam engines and cranes ==
=== 1820s ===
About 1827 the company supplied three steam engines to André Koechlin & Cie in France, one for the Mulhouse cotton mill for which Sharp, Roberts and Co. supplied most of the equipment, one for coal mines at Ronchamp, and one for the Bourcart factory. Hick attended at least two of these installations in person during 1827.

A 1:10 scale model of a double jib crane designed by Benjamin Hick is displayed at the Musee des Arts et Metiers.

=== 1830s ===
From 1836 steam locomotives became their main business. Up to 1840 they produced 56, 28 of which went abroad. Of note is a 4-2-0 for the South Carolina Railroad to the design of Horatio Allen. This had 4-foot-6-inch (1.37 m) drivers, with a swivelling front bogie, and reputed to have worked for 35 years. A deal of sub-contract work came from Edward Bury and Company.

=== 1840s ===
Peter Rothwell Jr
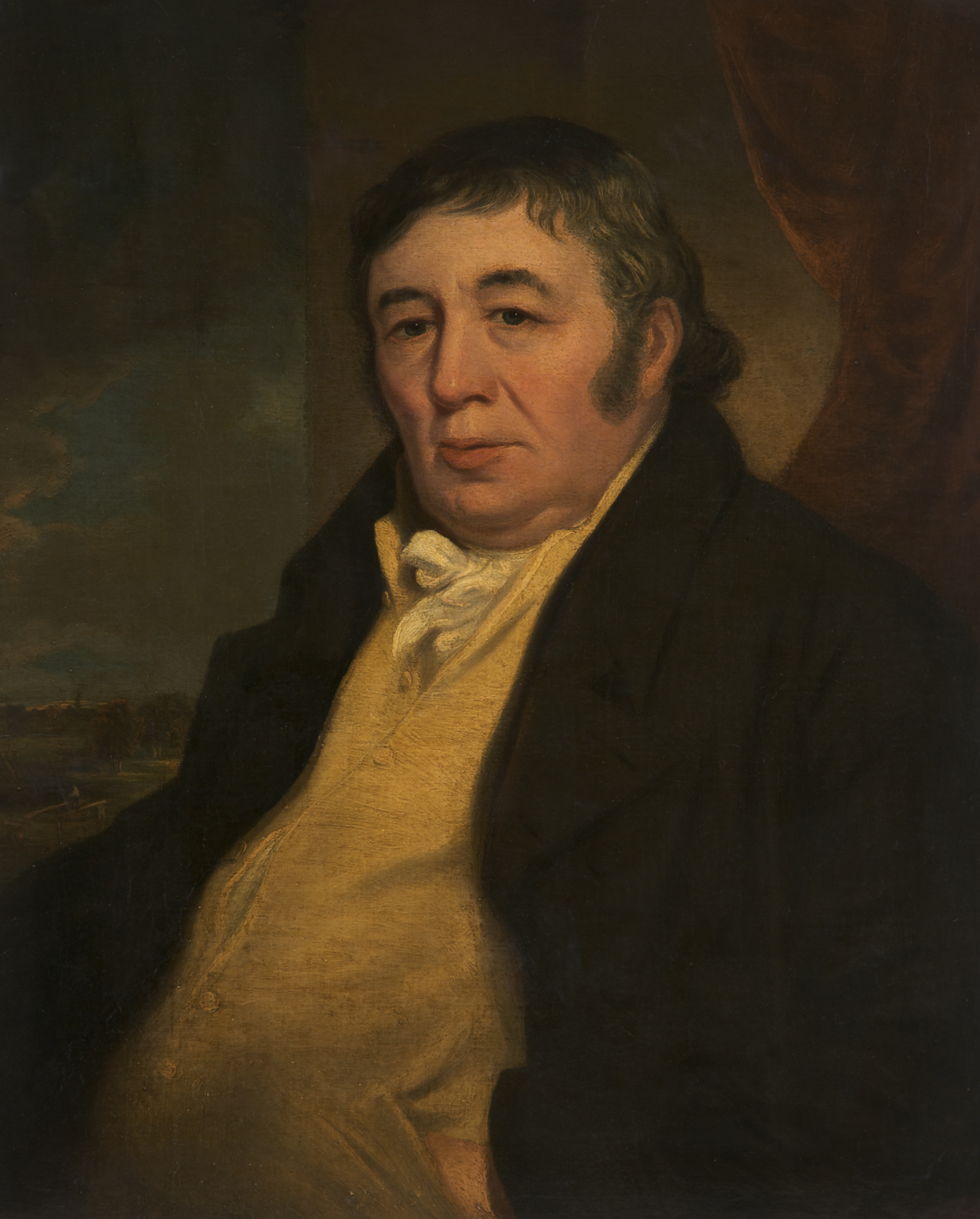
- by Unknown artist
- Born: 1793
- Died: 1849 (aged 55–56)
- Occupations: Civil and Mechanical engineer
- Known for: Steam engines Locomotives; Art collector

From 1841, the company began a batch of engines for the broad gauge Great Western Railway. The largest order came in 1847 for 28 2-2-2 engines for the London and South Western Railway.

=== 1850s ===
Possibly the most remarkable were some 4-2-4 engines for the Bristol and Exeter Railway built in 1853/4 with 9-foot-diameter (2.7 m) unflanged driving wheels, and two ball-and-socket swivelled bogies. They weighed 42 tons and achieved speeds of 82 miles per hour (132 km/h), the fastest engines of the time.

The quality of the company's products brought in repeat orders. Many of the engines were still in service twenty years later. From 1857 the engines were to Alexander Allan's design and were similar to the Old Crewe type. These were sold to the Lancaster and Carlisle Railway and the Eastern Counties Railway.

The last to be built were four broad gauge engines for the Bristol and Exeter Railway and two saddle tanks for the Carmarthen and Cardigan Railway.

== Closure ==
In the face of reduced business and increasing competition, the company closed in 1864. Part of the works was taken over by the Bolton Iron and Steel Company, which was later absorbed by Henry Bessemer and Company in 1906.

== See also ==
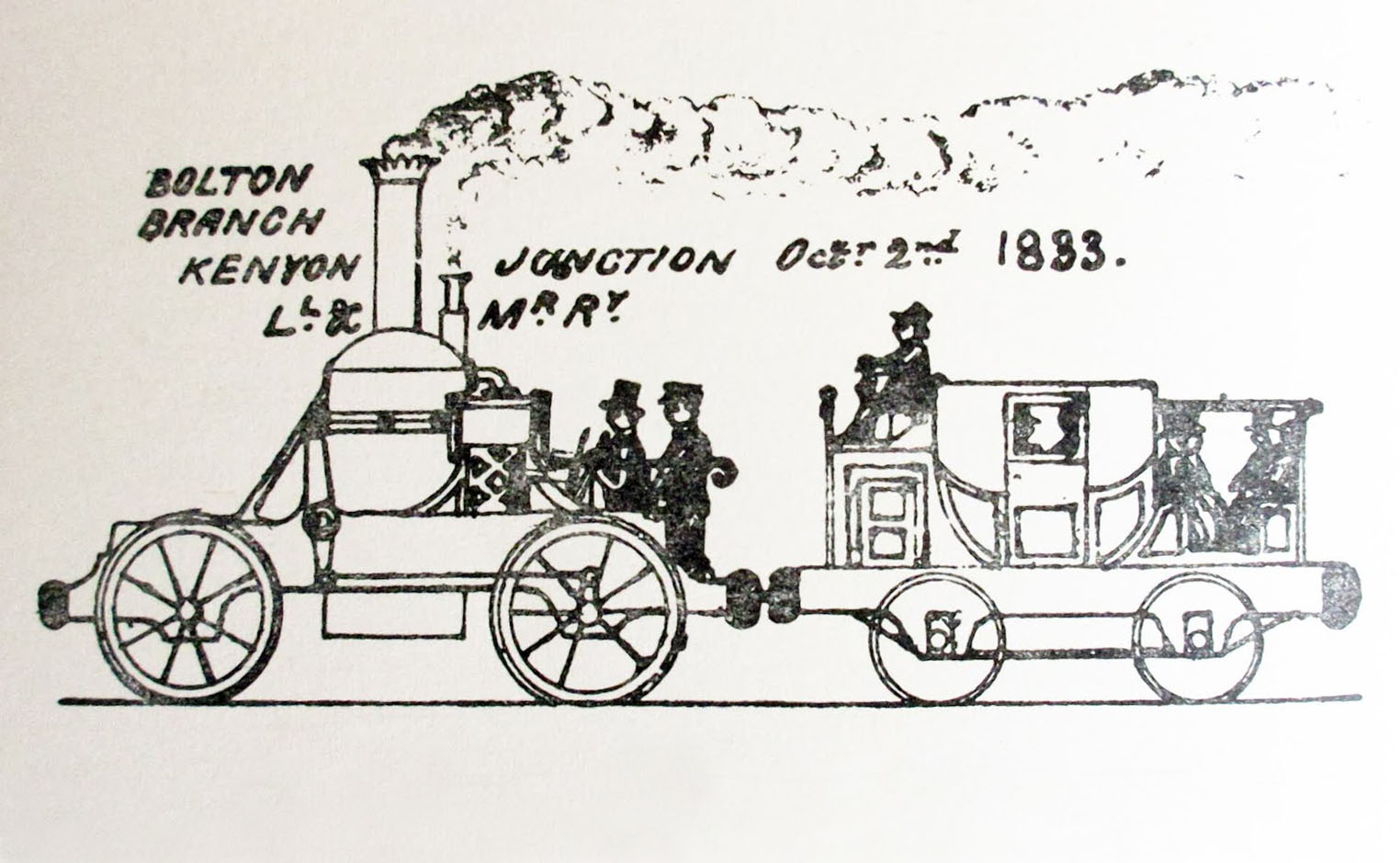
Union with a carriage, 1833, by Theodore West

- Samuel Crompton
- Robert Daglish Jr. - trained with Hick and Rothwell.
- Perseverance (1829) - similar in layout to Union by Rothwell, Hick & Co.
- Pontchartrain Railroad
- List of Saxon locomotives and railcars
- List of Liverpool and Manchester Railway locomotives
- GWR Leo Class
- Abbey Mills Pumping Station
- W & J Galloway & Sons
