= List of 7-foot gauge railway locomotive names =

This is a list of the names of broad gauge railway locomotives built in the United Kingdom during the heyday of that gauge (which ended in that country by 1892 with the final triumph of standard gauge). Throughout the history of railways many locomotives have been named (just as many have been numbered, and many have borne both a name and a number), but Britain's Great Western Railway, the prime exponent of the broad gauge, was noted for being an enthusiastic namer throughout its long existence, and perhaps less interested in numbering - although all locomotives carried numbers.

The name of the first locomotive of a batch was often the name by which the whole class was known, such as Fire Fly or Victoria.

As with other named locomotives, broad-gauge ones drew their names from a wide variety of sources. As well as the many names from Greek, Roman and other mythologies, locomotives were named after famous people, literature, flora, fauna, towns, and geographical features, as well as imagery suggestive of speed and power:

- Mythology – Banshee, Osiris, Peri, Python, Venus
- Famous people – Brunel, Dido, Euripides, Iron Duke, Victoria
- Literature – Ivanhoe, Mazeppa, Robin Hood, Ulysses
- Flora and fauna – Bee, Hawk, Lily, Shamrock, Zebra
- Towns – Bristol, Reading, Swindon, Wickwar, Windsor
- Geography – Exe, Hecla, Severn, Stromboli, Yeo
- Speed- and power-imagery – Comet, Fire Ball, Hurricane, Lightning, Rocket

Key This list covers the 7 ft (2,134 mm) broad gauge locomotives of the following railways:

- BGR - Bristol and Gloucester Railway
- CCR - Carmarthen and Cardigan Railway
- GWR - Great Western Railway
- LVR - Llynvi Valley Railway
- NCJR - Newquay and Cornwall Junction Railway
- NDR - North Devon Railway
- SDR - South Devon Railway
- SWMR - South Wales Mineral Railway
- S&WR - Severn and Wye Railway
- TBR - Torbay and Brixham Railway
- WCR - West Cornwall Railway

== A ==
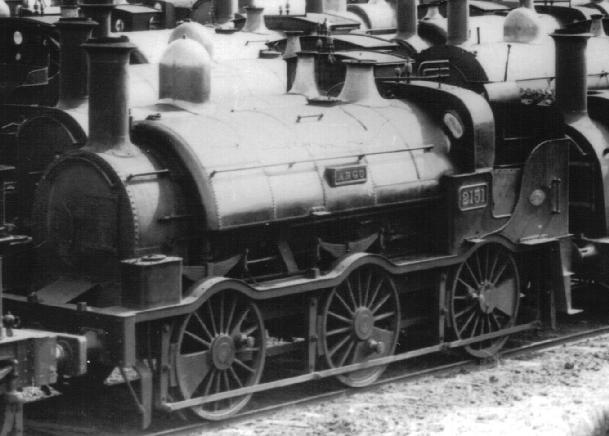
South Devon Railway Argo

- Abbot (Literature: The Abbot)
  GWR Waverley class 4-4-0 (1855 - 1876)
- Abdul Medjid (Famous personality: Abdul Medjid of Turkey)
  GWR Victoria class 2-4-0 (1856 - 1877)
- Acheron (Greek mythology: Acheron)
  GWR Fire Fly class 2-2-2 (1842 - 1866)
  GWR Hawthorn class 2-4-0 (1866 - 1887)
- Achilles (Greek mythology: Achilles)
  GWR Fire Fly class 2-2-2 (1841 -1867)
  SDR Buffalo class 0-6-0ST (1873 - 1892)
- Actaeon (Greek mythology: Actaeon)
  GWR Fire Fly class 2-2-2 (1841 - 1868)
- Ada
  LVR and SDR 0-6-0ST (1862 - 1884)
- Aeolus (Greek mythology: Aeolus)
  GWR Charles Tayleur 2-2-2 (1837 - 1867)
- Ajax (Greek mythology: Ajax)
  GWR Mather, Dixon 2-2-2 (1838 - 1840)
  GWR Premier class 0-6-0 (1846 - 1871)
  SDR Dido class 0-6-0ST (1860 - 1884)
- Alexander (Famous personality: Alexander II of Russia)
  GWR Victoria class 2-4-0 (1856 - 1878)
- Aligator (Powerful animal: Alligator)
  GWR Pyracmon class 0-6-0 (1848 - 1873)
- Alma (British battle: Battle of Alma)
  GWR Iron Duke class 4-2-2 (1854 - 1872)
  GWR Rover class 4-2-2 (1880 - 1892)
- Amazon (Mythical peoples: Amazons)
  GWR Iron Duke class 4-2-2 (1851 - 1877)
  GWR Rover class 4-2-2 (1878 - 1892)
- Amphion (Greek mythology: Amphion)
  GWR Standard Goods 0-6-0 (1856 - 1877)
- Antelope (Fast animal: Antelope)
  GWR Sun class 2-2-2 (1841 - 1870)
  SDR Eagle class 4-4-0ST (1859 - 1884)
- Antiquary (Literature: The Antiquary)
  GWR Waverley class 4-4-0 (1855 - 1876)
- Apollo (Greek mythology: Apollo)
  GWR Charles Tayleur 2-2-2 (1838 - 1867)
- Aquarius (Zodiac: Aquarius)
  GWR Leo class 2-4-0 (1842 - 1870)
- Arab (Classical peoples: Arab)
  GWR Fire Fly class 2-2-2 (1841 - 1870)
- Ariadne (Greek mythology: Ariadne)
  GWR Standard Goods 0-6-0 (1852 - 1879)
- Ariel (Biblical: Ariel)
  GWR Mather, Dixon 2-2-2 (1838 - 1840)
- Aries (Zodiac: Aries)
  GWR Leo class 2-4-0 (1841 - 1871)
- Argo (Greek mythology: Argo)
  GWR Premier class 0-6-0 (1846 - 1855)
  SDR Dido class 0-6-0ST (1863 - 1892)
- Argus (Greek mythology: see Argo)
  GWR Fire Fly class 2-2-2 (1842 - 1873)
- Arrow (Speed: Arrow)
  GWR Fire Fly class 2-2-2 (1841 - 1864)
- Assagais
  GWR Sun class 2-2-2 (1841 - 1875)
- Atlas (Greek mythology: Atlas)
  GWR Sharp, Roberts 2-2-2 (1838 - 1872)
  SDR Dido class 0-6-0ST (1863 - 1885)
- Aurora (Greek mythology: Aurora)
  GWR Sun class 2-2-2 (1840 - 1866)
  SDR Comet class 4-4-0ST (1852 - 1878)
- Avalanche (Power: Avalanche)
  GWR Banking class 0-6-0ST (1846 - 1865)
- Avon (Geography: River Avon)
  GWR Standard Goods 0-6-0 (1857 - 1877)
- Avonside (Engineer: see Avonside Engine Company)
  GWR Hawthorn class 2-4-0 (c.1865 - 1892)
- Azalia (Flower: Azalea)
  GWR Metropolitan class 2-4-0T (1864 - 1872)

== B ==
- Bacchus (Roman mythology: Bacchus)
  GWR Charles Tayleur 2-2-2 (1837 - 1842)
- Balaklava (British battle: Battle of Balaklava)
  GWR Iron Duke class 4-2-2 (1854 - 1871)
  GWR Rover class 4-2-2 (1871 - 1892)
- Banshee (Irish mythology: Banshee)
  GWR Standard Goods 0-6-0 (1854 - 1879)
- Barum
  NDR 2-2-2- (1855 - 1870)
- Bath (Geography: Bath)
  GWR Swindon class 0-6-0 (1866 - 1874)
- Bee (Insect: Bee)
  GWR Metropolitan class 2-4-0T (1862 - 1874)
- Behemoth (Biblical: Behemoth)
  GWR Pyracmon class 0-6-0 (1848 - 1873)
- Bellerophon (Greek mythology: Bellerophon)
  GWR Premier class 0-6-0 (1846 - 1870)
- Bellona (Roman mythology: Bellona)
  GWR Fire Fly class 2-2-2 (1841 - 1870)
- Bergion
  GWR Premier class 0-6-0 (1847 - 1870)
- Berkeley (Geography: Berkeley)
  BGR 2-2-2 (1844 - 1856)
- Bey (Leader of people: Bey)
  GWR Metropolitan class 2-4-0T (1862 - 1872)
- Beyer (Famous engineer: Charles Beyer)
  GWR Hawthorn class 2-4-0 (1865 - 1877)
  GWR Hawthorn class 2-4-0T (1877 - 1887)
- Birmingham (Geography: Birmingham)
  GWR Swindon class 0-6-0 (1866 - 1873)
- Bithon
  GWR Banking class 0-6-0ST (1854 - 1871)
- Blenkensop (Famous engineer: John Blenkinsop)
  GWR Hawthorn class 2-4-0 (1865 - 1892)
- Boyne (Geography: River Boyne)
  GWR Standard Goods 0-6-0 (1857 - 1872)
- Briarcus
  GWR Premier class 0-6-0 (1847 - 1870)
- Brigand
  GWR Bogie class 4-4-0ST (1849 - 1873)
- Bright Star
  GWR Star class 2-2-2 (1841 - 1864)
- Brindley (Famous engineer: James Brindley)
  GWR Victoria class 2-4-0 (1863 - 1879)
- Bristol (Geography: Bristol)
  BGR 2-2-2 (1844 - 1855)
  GWR Swindon class 0-6-0 (1865 - 1873)
- Brontes (Greek mythology: Brontes)
  GWR Premier class 0-6-0 (1847 - 1872)
- Brunel (Famous engineer: Isambard Kingdom Brunel)
  GWR Victoria class 2-4-0 (1863 - 1879)
- Brutus (Roman personality: Marcus Junius Brutus)
  GWR Standard Goods 0-6-0 (1854 - 1874)
  SDR Dido class 0-6-0ST (1862 - 1884)
- Buffalo (Animal: Buffalo)
  GWR Leo class 2-4-0 (1841 - 1865)
  SDR Buffalo class 0-6-0ST (1872 - 1892)
- Bulkeley
  GWR Sir Watkin class 0-6-0T (1865 - 1872)
  SDR 0-6-0ST (1872 - 1890)
  GWR Rover class 4-2-2 (1880 - 1892)
- Bury (Famous engineer: Edward Bury)
  GWR Hawthorn class 2-4-0 (1865 - 1877)
  GWR Hawthorn class 2-4-0T (1877 - 1892)
  GWR Pyracmon class 0-6-0 (1848 - 1873)

== C ==
- Caesar (leader of people: Caesar)
  GWR Caesar class 0-6-0 (1851 - 1880)
- Caliban (Shakespear character: Caliban)
  GWR Pyracmon class 0-6-0 (1848 - 1873)
- Caliph (Leadrer of people: Caliph)
  GWR Standard Goods 0-6-0 (1854 - 1878)
- Cambyses (Leader of people: Cambyses)
  GWR Standard Goods 0-6-0 (1854 - 1877)
- Camel (Animal: Camel)
  SDR Buffalo class 0-6-0ST (1872 - 1892)
- Camelia [sic] (Flower: Camellia)
  GWR Metropolitan class 2-4-0T (1863 - 1876)
- Cancer (Zodiac: Cancer)
  GWR Leo class 2-4-0 (1841 - 1874)
- Capricornus (Zodiac: Capricorn)
  GWR Leo class 2-4-0 (1842 - 1870)
- Castor (Greek mythology: Castor and Pollux)
  GWR Fire Fly class 2-2-2 (1841 - 1874)
  SDR Eagle class 4-4-0ST (1865 - 1882)
- Cato (Roman personality: Cato)
  GWR Standard Goods 0-6-0 (1853 - 1871)
  SDR Eagle class 4-4-0ST (1863 - 1877)
- Centaur (Greek mythology: Centaur)
  GWR Fire Fly class 2-2-2 (1841 - 1867)
- Cerebus (Greek mythology: Cerberus)
  GWR Fire Fly class 2-2-2 (1841 - 1866)
  GWR Hawthorn class 2-4-0 (1866 - 1877)
  GWR Hawthorn class 2-4-0T (1877 - 1892)
- Ceres (Roman mythology: Ceres)
  GWR Standard Goods 0-6-0 (1854 - 1877)
- Champion (Power: Champion)
  GWR Standard Goods 0-6-0 (1862 - 1878)
- Charon (Greek mythology: Charon)
  GWR Fire Fly class 2-2-2 (1840 - 1878)
- Cheltenham (Geography: Cheltenham)
  BGR 2-2-2 (1844 - 1856)
- Chester (Geography: Chester)
  GWR Swindon class 0-6-0 (1866 - 1873)
- Chronus (Greek mythology: Chronos)
  GWR Standard Goods 0-6-0 (1861 - 1878)
- Cicero (Roman personality: Cicero)
  GWR Standard Goods 0-6-0 (1853 - 1871)
- Clyde (Geography: River Clyde)
  GWR Standard Goods 0-6-0 (1858 - 1872)
- Coeur de Lion (Literary: see The Waverley Novels)
  GWR Waverley class 4-4-0 (1855 - 1876)
- Comet (Speed: Comet)
  GWR Sun class 2-2-2 (1840 - 1871)
  SDR Comet class 4-4-0ST (1851 - 1884)
- Coquette
  GWR Standard Goods 0-6-0 (1853 - 1875)
- Cornwall (Geography: Cornwall)
  NCJR 0-6-0T
- Corsair
  GWR Bogie class 4-4-0ST (1849 - 1873)
- Cossack (Classical peoples: Cossack)
  GWR Standard Goods 0-6-0 (1862 - 1880)
- Courier (Speed: Courier)
  GWR Iron Duke class 4-2-2 (1848 - 1877)
  GWR Rover class 4-2-2 (1878 - 1892)
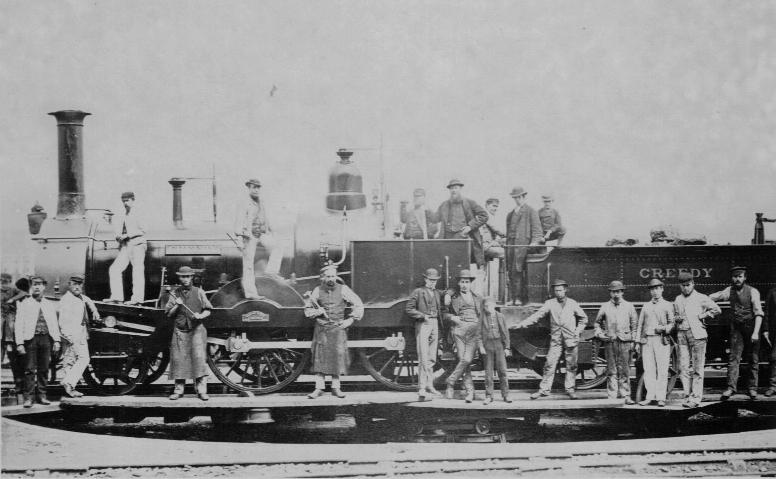
- North Devon Railway Creedy
  Creedy (Geography: River Creedy)
  NDR 2-4-0 (1855 - 1877)
- Creese
  GWR Sun class 2-2-2 (1842 - 1866)
- Creon (Greek mythology: Creon)
  GWR Standard Goods 0-6-0 (1856 - 1872)
- Crimea (British battles: Crimean War)
  GWR Iron Duke class 4-2-2 (1855 - 1876)
  GWR Rover class 4-2-2 (1878 - 1892)
- Crow (Bird: Crow)
  SDR Raven class 0-4-0ST (1874 - 1892)
- Cupid (Roman mythology: Cupid and Psyche)
  GWR Standard Goods 0-6-0 (1853 - 1874)
- Cyclops (Greek mythology: Cyclops)
  GWR Fire Fly class 2-2-2 (1840 - 1865)
- Cyprus (Greek mythology: birthplace of Aphrodite)
  GWR Standard Goods 0-6-0 (1854 - 1878)
- Czar (Leader of people: Czar)
  GWR Metropolitan class 2-4-0T (1862 - 1871)

== D ==
- Damon (Greek mythology: Damon and Pythias)
  GWR Fire Fly class 2-2-2 (1842 - 11870)
  SDR Comet class 4-4-0ST (1852 - 1876)
- Dart (Speed: Dart; Geography: River Dart)
  GWR Fire Fly class 2-2-2 (1841 - 1870)
  NDR 2-2-2 (1855 - 1867)
  SDR Eagle class 4-4-0ST (1863 - 1885)
  NDR 2-2-2 (1868 - 1877)
- Defiance
  BGR / NDR 0-6-0 (1844 - 1867)
- Dewrance
  GWR Hawthorn class 2-4-0 (1865 - 1892)
- Diana (Greek mythology: Diana)
  GWR Standard Goods 0-6-0 (1853 - 1877)
- Dido (Classical ruler: Dido)
  GWR Caesar class 0-6-0 (1851 - 1872)
  SDR Dido class 0-6-0ST (1860 - 1877)
- Djerid
  GWR Sun class 2-2-2 (1841 - 1870)
- Dog Star
  GWR Star class 2-2-2 (1839 -1869)
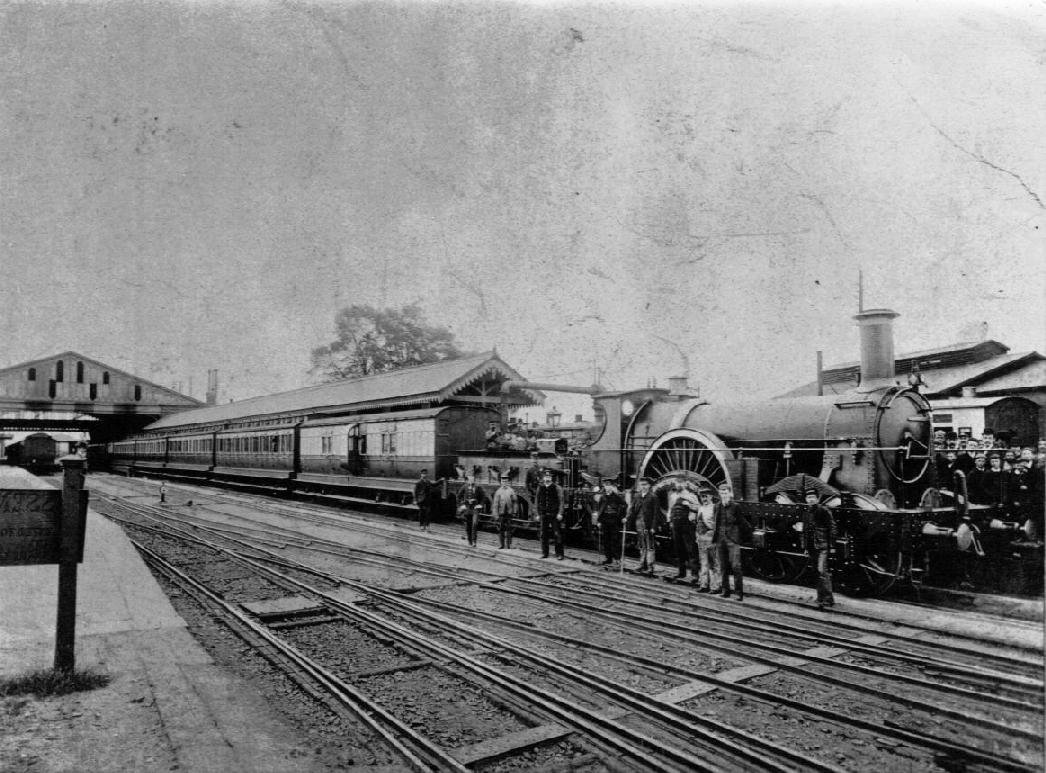
- Iron Duke Class Dragon
  Dragon (Mythological animal: Dragon)
  GWR Iron Duke class 4-2-2 (1848 - 1872)
  SDR Buffalo class 0-6-0ST (1873 - 1892)
  GWR Rover class 4-2-2 (1880 - 1892)
- Dreadnought
  BGR / NDR 0-6-0 (1844 - 1863)
  GWR Premier class 0-6-0 (1846 - 1871)
- Dromedary (Animal: Dromedary)
  GWR Leo class 2-4-0 (1841 - 1866)
  SDR Buffalo class 0-6-0ST (1873 - 1892)
- Druid (Classical peoples: Druid)
  GWR Caesar class 0-6-0 (1851 - 1879)

== E ==
- Eagle (Bird: Eagle)
  GWR Sharp, Roberts 2-2-2 (1838 - 1871)
  SDR Eagle class 4-4-0ST (1859 - 1876)
- Eclipse
  GWR Sun class 2-2-2 (1840 - 1864)
- Electra (Greek mythology: Electra)
  GWR Fire Fly class 2-2-2 (1842 - 1867)
- Elephant (Animal: Elephant)
  GWR Leo class 2-4-0 (1841 - 1870)
  SDR Buffalo class 0-6-0ST (1872 - 1892)
- Elk (Animal: Elk)
  SDR Eagle class 4-4-0ST (1859 - 1877)
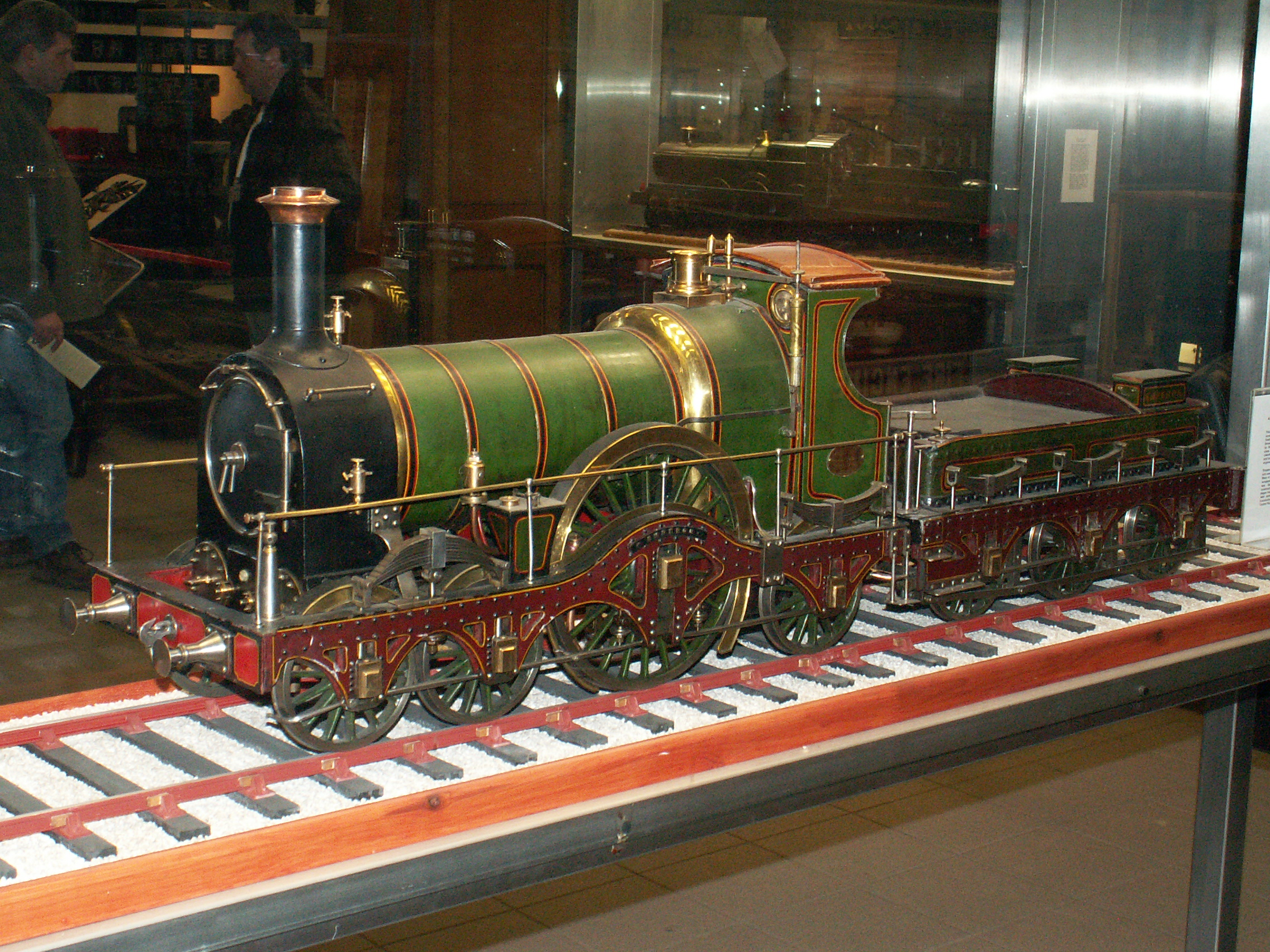
- Rover Class Emperor (A large scale model in STEAM Museum)
  Emperor (Leader of people: Emperor)
  GWR Iron Duke class 4-2-2 (1847 - 1873)
  SDR Buffalo class 0-6-0ST (1873 - 1892)
  GWR Rover class 4-2-2 (1880 - 1892)
- Erebus (Greek mythology: Erebus)
  GWR Fire Fly class 2-2-2 (1842 - 1873)
- Esk (Geography: River Esk)
  GWR Standard Goods 0-6-0 (1857 - 1880)
- Estaffette
  GWR Iron Duke class 4-2-2 (1850 - 1884)
- Ethon (Greek mythology: Ethon)
  GWR Standard Goods 0-6-0 (1863 - 1883)
- Etna (Geography: Etna)
  GWR Leo class 2-4-0 (1841 - 1870)
  CCR and SDR 4-4-0ST (1864 - 1892)
- Eupatoria (British battle: Eupatoria)
  GWR Iron Duke class 4-2-2 (1855 - 1876)
  GWR Rover class 4-2-2 (1878 - 1892)
- Euripides (Greek personality: Euripides)
  GWR Bogie class 4-4-0ST (1855 - 1871)
- Europa (Greek mythology: Europa)
  GWR Standard Goods 0-6-0 (1853 - 1892)
- Evening Star
  GWR Star class 2-2-2 (1839 - 1871)
- Exe (Geography: River Exe)
  GWR Haigh Foundry 2-2-2 (1846 - 1851?)
  NDR 2-2-2 (1856 - 1870)

== F ==
- Falcon (Bird: Falcon)
  GWR Fire Fly class 2-2-2 (1840 -1867)
  SDR Comet class 4-4-0ST (1852 - 1878)
- Fenton (Famous engineer: James Fenton)
  GWR Hawthorn class 2-4-0 (1865 - 1892)
- Fire Ball (Power: Fireball)
  GWR Fire Fly class 2-2-2 (1840 - 1866)
- Fire Brand (Power: Firebrand)
  GWR Fire Fly class 2-2-2 (1840 - 1866)
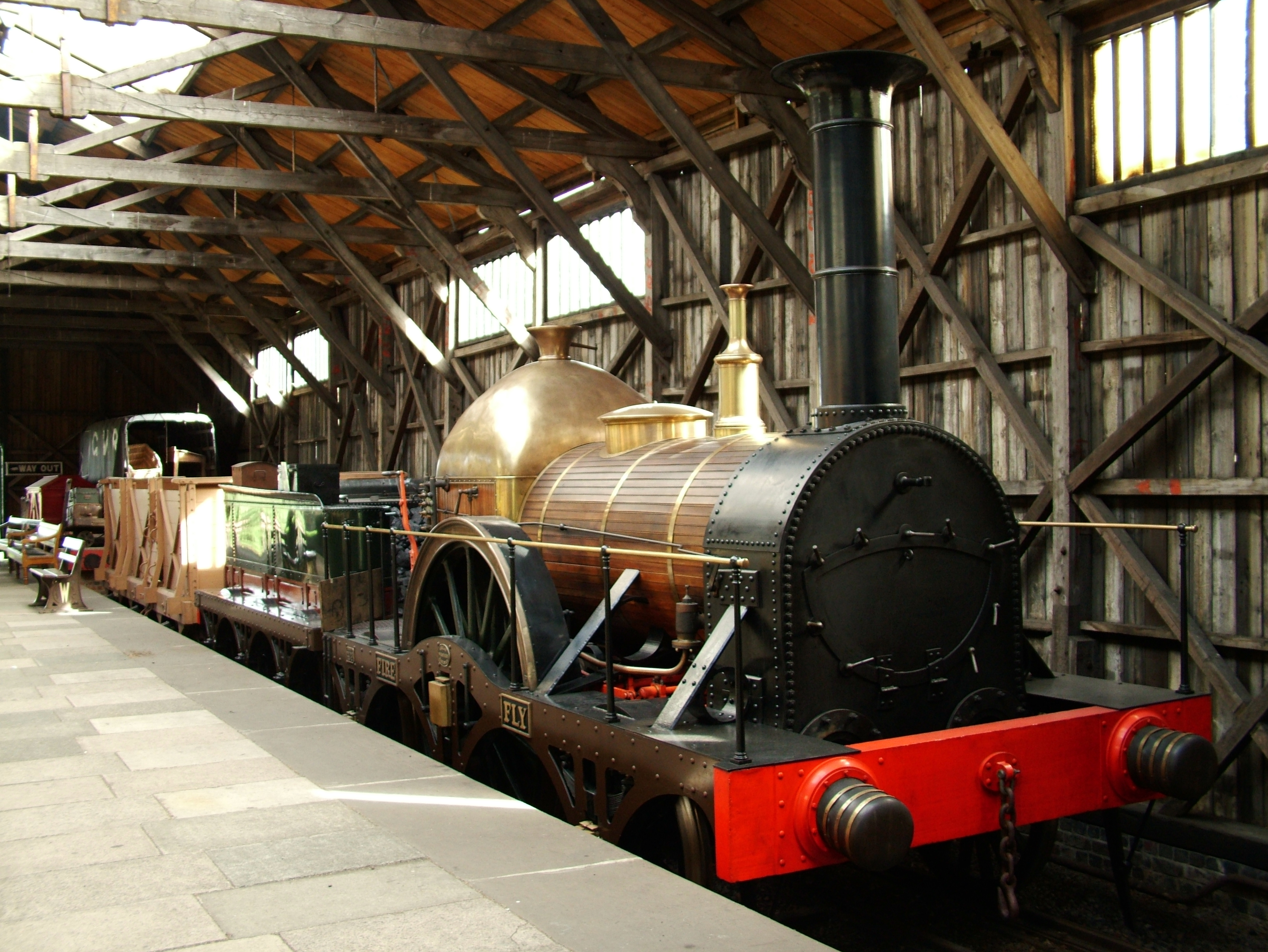
- Replica of Fire Fly
  Fire Fly (Insect: Firefly)
  GWR Fire Fly class 2-2-2 (1840 - 1870)
  Fire Fly replica 2-2-2 (Built 2005)
- Fire King
  GWR Fire Fly class 2-2-2 (1840 - 1875)
- Fleur-de-Lis (Flower: Fleur-de-Lis)
  GWR Metropolitan class 2-4-0T (1863 - 1872)
- Flirt
  GWR Standard Goods 0-6-0 (1852 - 1874)
- Flora (Roman mythology: Flora)
  GWR Standard Goods 0-6-0 (1854 - 1872)
- Florence (Geography: Florence)
  GWR Caesar class 0-6-0 (1851 - 1874)
- Forth (Geography: River Forth)
  GWR Standard Goods 0-6-0 (1858 - 1878)
- Forrester
  S&WR 0-6-0T (1868? - 1872)
- Foster (Famous engineer: James Foster)
  GWR Hawthorn class 2-4-0 (1865 - 1876)
- Fowler (Famous engineer: John Fowler)
  GWR Sir Watkin class 0-6-0T (1866 - 1872)
  SDR 0-6-0ST (1872 - 1887)
- Friar Tuck:
  S&WR 0-6-0T (1870 - 1872)
- Fulton (Famous engineer: Robert Fulton)
  GWR Victoria class 2-4-0 (1863 - 1876)
- Fury (Roman mythology: Furies)
  GWR Premier class 0-6-0 (1846 - 1871)

== G ==
- Ganymede (Greek mythology: Ganymede)
  GWR Fire Fly class 2-2-2 (1842 - 1878)
- Gazelle (Fast animal: Gazelle)
  GWR Sun class 2-2-2 (1841 - 1879)
  SDR Eagle class 4-4-0ST (1859 - 1865)
- Gemini (Zodiac: Gemini)
  GWR Leo class 2-4-0 (1841 - 1866)
- Geryon (Greek mythology: Geryon)
  GWR Standard Goods 0-6-0 (1854 - 1876)
- Giaour (Literature: The Giaour)
  GWR Standard Goods 0-6-0 (1852 - 1880)
- Giraffe (Animal: Giraffe)
  GWR Sun class 2-2-2 (1841 - 1872)
  SDR Eagle class 4-4-0ST (1859 - 1877)
- Gladiator (Power: Gladiator)
  GWR Standard Goods 0-6-0 (1861 - 1877)
- Gloucester (Geography: Gloucester)
  BGR 2-2-2 (1844 - 1855)
  GWR Swindon class 0-6-0 (1866 - 1873)
- Glyncorrwg (Geography: Glyncorrwg)
  SWMR 0-4-2ST (1864 - 1872)
- Gnat (Insect: Gnat)
  GWR Metropolitan class 2-4-0T (1862 - 1874)
- Goat (Animal: Goat)
  SDR Owl class 0-4-0WT (1873 - 1893)
- Goliah (Biblical: Goliath)
  GWR Hercules class 0-6-0 (1842 - 1871)
  SDR Tornado class 0-6-0ST (1855 - 1885)
- Gooch (Famous engineer: Daniel Gooch)
  GWR Hawthorn class 2-4-0 (1865 - 1892)
- Gorgon (Greek mythology: Gorgon)
  GWR Fire Fly class 2-2-2 (1841 - 1878)
  SDR Gorgon class 4-4-0ST (1866 - 1892)
- Great Britain (Geography: Great Britain)
  GWR Iron Duke class 4-2-2 (1847 - 1880)
  GWR Rover class 4-2-2 (1880 - 1892)
- Great Western (Railway: Great Western Railway)
  GWR 2-2-2 (1846)
  GWR Iron Duke class 4-2-2 (1846 - 1870)
  GWR Rover class 4-2-2 (1888 - 1892)
- Greyhound (Fast animal: Greyhound)
  GWR Fire Fly class 2-2-2 (1841 - 1866)
- Gyfeillon
  GWR Standard Goods 0-6-0 (1856 - 1879)

== H ==
- Hackworth (Famous engineer: Timothy Hackworth)
  GWR Hawthorn class 2-4-0 (1865 - 1892)
- Hades (Greek mythology: Hades)
  GWR Standard Goods 0-6-0 (1861 - 1878)
- Harpy (Greek mythology: Harpy)
  GWR Fire Fly class 2-2-2 (1841- 1873)
- Hawk (Bird: Hawk)
  GWR Fire Fly class 2-2-2 (1840 - 1865)
  SDR Eagle class 4-4-0ST (1859 - 1886)
  GWR Hawthorn class 2-4-0 (1865 - 1892)
- Hawthorn (Famous engineer: see Hawthorn Leslie and Company)
  GWR Hawthorn class 2-4-0 (1865 - 1876)
- Hebe (Greek mythology: Hebe)
  GWR Standard Goods 0-6-0(1852 - 1877)
  SDR Dido class 0-6-0ST (1860 - 1877)
- Hecate (Greek mythology: Hecate)
  GWR Fire Fly class 2-2-2 (1841 - 1867)
- Hecla (Geography: Hecla)
  GWR Leo class 2-4-0 (1841 - 1864)
  CCR and SDR 4-4-0ST (1864 - 1892)
- Hector (Greek mythology: Hector)
  GWR Fire Fly class 2-2-2 (1841 - 1866)
  SDR Eagle class 4-4-0ST (1860 - 1892)
- Hecuba (Greek mythology: Hecuba)
  GWR Standard Goods 0-6-0 (1853 - 1873)
- Hedley (Famous engineer: William Hedley)
  GWR Hawthorn class 2-4-0 (1865 - 1877)
  GWR Hawthorn class 2-4-0T (1877 - 1892)
- Hercules (Roman mythology: Hercules)
  GWR Hercules class 0-6-0 (1842 - 1870)
  SDR Buffalo class 0-6-0ST (1872 - 1889)
- Hereford (Geography: Hereford)
  GWR Swindon class 0-6-0 (1866 - 1872)
- Hero (Mythology: Hero)
  GWR Caesar class 0-6-0 (1851 - 1871)
  SDR Dido class 0-6-0ST (1860 - 1887)
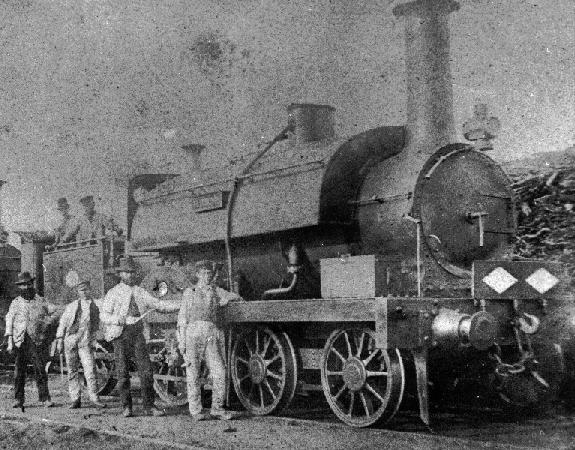
- South Devon Railway 4-4-0ST Heron
  Heron (Bird: Heron)
  CCR and SDR 4-4-0T (1861 - 1872)
  SDR 4-4-0ST (1872 - 1892)
- Hesiod (Greek personality: Hesiod)
  GWR Bogie class 4-4-0ST (1855 - 1872)
- Hesperus (Roman mythology: Hesperus)
  GWR Sun class 2-2-2 (1841 - 1876)
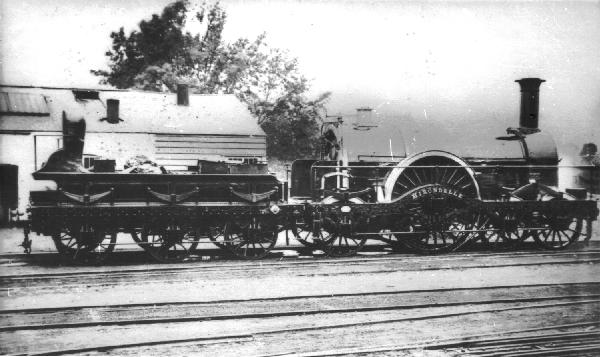
- Iron Duke Class Hirondelle
  Hirondelle (Bird: French for Swallow)
  GWR Iron Duke class 4-2-2 (1848 - 1873)
  GWR Rover class 4-2-2 (1873 - 1890)
- Homer (Greek personality: Homer)
  GWR Bogie class 4-4-0ST (1854 - 1873)
- Horace (Roman personality: Horace)
  GWR Bogie class 4-4-0ST (1854 - 1880)
- Hornet (Insect: Hornet)
  GWR Metropolitan class 2-4-0T (1862 - 1873)
- Humber (Geography: River Humber)
  GWR Standard Goods 0-6-0 (1857 - 1883)
- Hurricane (Power: Hurricane)
  GWR Harrison 0-4-0+6 (1838 - 1839)
- Hydra (Greek mythology: Lernaean Hydra)
  GWR Fire Fly class 2-2-2 (1842 - 1865)

== I ==
- Iago (Literature: Iago)
  GWR Banking class 0-6-0ST (1852 - 1881)
- Industry
  BGR 2-4-0 (1844 - 1856)
- Inkermann (British Battle of Inkermann)
  GWR Iron Duke class 4-2-2 (1855 - 1877)
  GWR Rover class 4-2-2 (1878 - 1892)
- Iris (Greek mythology: Iris)
  GWR Standard Goods 0-6-0 (1854 - 1874)
- Iron Duke (Famous personality: see Duke of Wellington)
  GWR Iron Duke class 4-2-2 (1847 - 1871)
  GWR Rover class 4-2-2 (1873- 1892)
  Iron Duke replica 4-2-2 (Built 1985)
- Ivanhoe (Literature: Ivanhoe)
  GWR Waverley class 4-4-0 (1855 - 1876)
- Ixion (Greek mythology: Ixion)
  GWR Fire Fly class 2-2-2 (1841 - 1879)
  SDR Comet class 4-4-0ST (1853 - 1878)

== J ==
- Janus (Greek mythology: Janus)
  GWR Standard Goods 0-6-0(1854 - 1880)
- Jason (Greek mythology: Jason)
  GWR Premier class 0-6-0 (1847 - 1870)
- Javelin
  GWR Sun class 2-2-2 (1841 - 1870)
- Jay (Bird: Jay)
  SDR Raven class 0-4-0ST (1875 - 1892)
- John Gray
  GWR Hawthorn class 2-4-0 (1865 - 1876)
- Juno (Roman mythology Juno)
  GWR Banking class 0-6-0ST (1852 - 1872)
  SDR Dido class 0-6-0ST (1864 - 1884)
- Jupiter (Roman mythology: Jupiter)
  GWR Fire Fly class 2-2-2 (1841 - 1867)
- Juvenal (Roman personality: Juvenal)
  GWR Bogie class 4-4-0ST (1854 - 1873)

== K ==
- Kaiser (Leader of people: Kaiser)
  GWR Metropolitan class 2-4-0T (1862 - 1872)
- Kertch (British battle: Kertch)
  GWR Iron Duke class 4-2-2 (1855 0 1872)
- Khan (Leader of people: Khan)
  GWR Metropolitan class 2-4-0T (1862 - 1872)
- King
  SDR 2-4-0T (1871 - 1878)

== L ==
- Lagoon
  GWR Standard Goods 0-6-0 (1861 - 1876)
- Lalla Rookh (Literary: Lalla-Rookh)
  GWR Waverley class 4-4-0 (1855 - 1872)
- Lance (Speed: Lance)
  GWR Sun class 2-2-2 (1841 - 1870)
  SDR Comet class 4-4-0ST (1851 - 1873)
  SDR Leopard class 4-4-0ST (1875 - 1892)
- Lark (Bird: Lark)
  SDR Raven class 0-4-0ST (1874 - 1892)
- Laurel (Tree: Bay Laurel)
  GWR Metropolitan class 2-4-0T (1864 - 1872)
- Leander (Greek mythology: Hero and Leander)
  GWR Standard Goods 0-6-0 (1852 - 1875)
- Leo (Zodiac: Leo)
  GWR Leo class 2-4-0 (1841 - 1870)
- Leonidas (Classical ruler: Leonidas I)
  GWR Standard Goods 0-6-0 (1863 - 1881)
- Leopard (Fast animal: Leopard)
  GWR Fire Fly class 2-2-2 (1840 - 1878)
  SDR Leopard class 4-4-0ST (1872 - 1893)
- Leopold (Famous personality: Leopold I of Belgium)
  GWR Victoria class 2-4-0 (1856 - 1877)
- Lethe (Greek mythology: Lethe)
  GWR Fire Fly class 2-2-2 (1842 - 1878)
- Libra (Zodiac: Libra)
  GWR Leo class 2-4-0 (1841 - 1871)
- Liffey (Geography: River Liffey)
  GWR Standard Goods 0-6-0 (1855 - 1872)
- Lightning (Speed: Lightning)
  GWR Iron Duke class 4-2-2 (1847 - 1878)
  GWR Rover class 4-2-2 (1878 - 1892)
- Lily (Flower: Lily)
  GWR Metropolitan class 2-4-0T (1864 - 1872)
- Lion (Powerful animal: Lion)
  GWR Sharp, Roberts 2-2-2 (1838 - 1847)
  SDR Eagle class 4-4-0ST (1859 - 1883)
- Load Star
  GWR Star class 2-2-2 (1841 - 1870)
- Locke (Famous engineer: Joseph Locke)
  GWR Victoria class 2-4-0 (1863 - 1881)
- Locust (Insect: Locust)
  GWR Metropolitan class 2-4-0T (1862 - 1876)
- London (Geography: London)
  GWR Swindon class 0-6-0 (1865 - 1873)
- Lord of the Isles (Leader of people: Lord of the Isles)
  GWR Iron Duke class 4-2-2 (1851 - 1884)
- Lucan (Roman personality: Lucan)
  GWR Bogie class 4-4-0ST (1855 - 1872)
- Lucifer (Roman mythology: Lucifer)
  GWR Fire Fly class 2-2-2 (1841 - 1870)
- Lucretius (Roman personality: Lucretius)
  GWR Bogie class 4-4-0ST (1854 - 1872)
- Luna (Roman mythology: Luna)
  GWR Standard Goods 0-6-0 (1863 - 1880)
- Lynx (Fast animal: Lynx)
  GWR Fire Fly class 2-2-2 (1840 -1870)
  SDR Eagle class 4-4-0ST (1859 - 1876)

== M ==
- Magi (Classical peoples: Magi)
  GWR Standard Goods 0-6-0 (1856 - 1879)
- Magpie (Bird: Magpie)
  CCR 4-4-0T (1861 - 1872)
  SDR 4-4-0ST (1872 - 1889)
- Mammoth (Powerful animal: Mammoth)
  GWR Pyracmon class 0-6-0 (1848 - 1873)
- Mars (Roman mythology: Mars)
  GWR Mather, Dixon 2-2-2 (1840 - 1840)
  GWR Fire Fly class 2-2-2 (1841 - 1868)
- Mazeppa (Literature: Mazeppa)
  GWR Fire Fly class 2-2-2 (1841 - 1868)
  SDR Eagle class 4-4-0ST (1859 - 1885)
- Medea (Greek mythology: Medea)
  GWR Fire Fly class 2-2-2 (1842 - 1873)
- Medusa (Greek mythology: Medusa)
  GWR Fire Fly class 2-2-2 (1842 - 1864)
- Melling
  GWR Hawthorn class 2-4-0 (1865 - 1877)
  GWR Hawthorn class 2-4-0T (1877 - 1892)
- Mentor (Greek mythology: Mentor)
  GWR Fire Fly class 2-2-2 (1841 - 1867)
- Mercury (Roman mythology: Mercury)
  GWR Mather, Dixon 2-2-2 (1839 - 1843)
  GWR Fire Fly class 2-2-2 (1841 - 1865)
- Meridian
  GWR Sun class 2-2-2 (1840 - 1870)
- Mersey (Geography: River Mersey)
  GWR Standard Goods 0-6-0 (1857 - 1879)
- Meteor (Speed: Meteor)
  GWR Sun class 2-2-2 (1840 - 1864)
  SDR Comet class 4-4-0ST (1851 - 1881)
- Metis (Greek mythology: Metis)
  GWR Standard Goods 0-6-0 (1855 - 1877)
- Midas (Greek mythology: Midas)
  GWR Standard Goods 0-6-0 (1854 - 1875)
- Miles
  GWR Sir Watkin class 0-6-0T (1866 - 1888)
- Milo (Roman personality: Titus Annius Milo)
  GWR Fire Fly class 2-2-2 (1841 - 1866)
- Minerva (Roman mythology: Minerva)
  GWR Standard Goods 0-6-0 (1853 - 1877)
- Minos (Greek mythology: Minos)
  GWR Fire Fly class 2-2-2 (1841 - 1870)
- Mogul (Leader of people: Mogul)
  GWR Metropolitan class 2-4-0T (1862 - 1872)
- Mole (Geography: River Mole)
  NDR 2-2-2 (1855 - 1870)
- Monarch (Leader of people Monarch)
  GWR Standard Goods 0-6-0 (1853 - 1879)
- Moose (Animal: Moose)
  GWR Prince class 2-2-2 (1846 - 1870)
- Morning Star
  GWR Star class 2-2-2 (1839 - 1869)
- Mosquito (Insect: Mosquito)
  GWR Metropolitan class 2-4-0T (1862 - 1877)
- Murdoch (Famous engineer: William Murdoch)
  GWR Hawthorn class 2-4-0 (1865 - 1892)
- Myrtle (Flower: Myrtle)
  GWR Metropolitan class 2-4-0T (1864 - 1873)

== N ==
- Napoleon (Famous personality: Napoleon I of France)
  GWR Victoria class 2-4-0 (1856 - 1880)
- Nelson (Famous people: Horatio Nelson, 1st Viscount Nelson)
  GWR Standard Goods 0-6-0 (1853 - 1873)
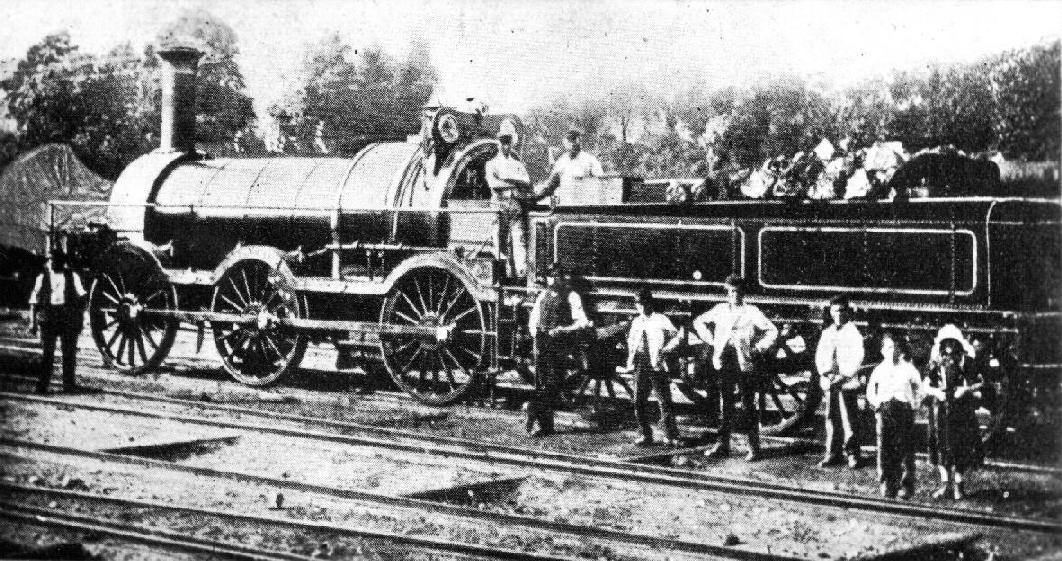
- Standard Goods Nemesis
  Nemesis (Greek mythology: Nemesis)
  GWR Standard Goods 0-6-0 (1855 - 1877)
- Neptune (Roman mythology: Neptune)
  GWR Charles Tayleur 2-2-2 (1838 - 1840)
  GWR Standard Goods 0-6-0 (1854 - 1881)
- Nero (Roman personality: Nero)
  GWR Standard Goods 0-6-0 (1855 - 1877)
- Newport (Geography: Newport)
  GWR Swindon class 0-6-0 (1866 - 1874)
- Newquay (Geography: Newquay)
  NCJR 2-4-0T (c.1869 - 1874)
- Nimrod (Classical leader: Nimrod)
  GWR Standard Goods 0-6-0 (1854 - 1877)
- Nora Creina (Literary muse:Lesbia hath a beaming eye)
  GWR Caesar class 0-6-0 (1851 - 1872)
- North Star (Astronomy: Pole star)
  GWR Star class 2-2-2 (1837 - 1871)
  North Star replica 2-2-2 (Built 1925)

== O ==
- Octavia (Roman personality: Claudia Octavia)
  GWR Standard Goods 0-6-0 (1855 - 1873)
- Olympus (Greek mythology: Mount Olympus)
  GWR Standard Goods 0-6-0 (1861 - 1879)
- Orion (Greek personality: Orion of Thebes)
  GWR Fire Fly class 2-2-2 (1842 - 1867)
  SDR Comet class 4-4-0ST (1853 - 1878)
- Orpheus (Greek mythology: Orpheus)
  GWR Standard Goods 0-6-0 (1861 - 1877)
- Oscar (Famous personality: Oscar I of Sweden)
  GWR Victoria class 2-4-0 (1856 - 1880)
- Orson
  GWR Standard Goods 0-6-0 (1854 - 1874)
- Osiris (Egyptian mythology: Osiris)
  SDR Comet class 4-4-0ST (1853 - 1873)
  GWR Standard Goods 0-6-0 (1855 - 1877)
  SDR Leopard class 4-4-0ST (1875 - 1892)
- Ostrich (Bird: Ostrich)
  GWR Fire Fly class 2-2-2 (1840 - 1865)
  SDR Comet class 4-4-0ST (1852 - 1877)
  GWR Hawthorn class 2-4-0 (1865 - 1877)
  GWR Hawthorn class 2-4-0T (1877 - 1892)
- Otho (Famous personality: Otto of Greece)
  GWR Victoria class 2-4-0 (1856 - 1880)
- Ovid (Roman personality: Ovid)
  GWR Bogie class 4-4-0ST (1854 - 1873)
- Owl (Bird: Owl)
  SDR Owl class 0-4-0WT (1873 - 1893)
- Oxford (Geography: Oxford)
  GWR Swindon class 0-6-0 (1866 - 1874)

== P ==
- Pallas (Greek mythology: Pallas)
  GWR Standard Goods 0-6-0 (1856 - 1879)
- Pandora (Greek mythology: Pandora)
  GWR Standard Goods 0-6-0 (1863 - 1880)
- Panthea
  GWR Standard Goods 0-6-0 (1856 - 1878)
- Panther (Powerful animal: Panther)
  GWR Fire Fly class 2-2-2 (1840 - 1869)
- Pasha (Leader of people: Pasha)
  GWR Iron Duke class 4-2-2 (1847 - 1876)
- Peacock (Famous engineer: Richard Peacock)
  GWR Hawthorn class 2-4-0 (1866 - 1875)
- Pearl
  GWR Standard Goods 0-6-0 (1852 - 1878)
- Pegasus (Greek mythology: Pegasus)
  GWR Fire Fly class 2-2-2 (1842 - 1868)
- Pelops (Greek mythology: Pelops)
  GWR Standard Goods 0-6-0 (1855 - 1876)
- Penn
  GWR Hawthorn class 2-4-0 (1866 - 1877)
  GWR Hawthorn class 2-4-0T (1877 - 1892)
- Penwith (Geography: Penwith)
  WCR 2-4-0ST (1872 - 1888)
- Peri
  GWR Prince class 2-2-2 (1846 - 1870)
- Perseus (Greek mythology: Perseus)
  GWR Iron Duke class 4-2-2 (1850 - 1880)
- Phlegethon (Greek mythology: Phlegethon)
  GWR Fire Fly class 2-2-2 (1842 - 1866)
  GWR Hawthorn class 2-4-0 (1866 - 1887)
- Phoenix (Greek mythology: Phoenix)
  GWR Fire Fly class 2-2-2 (1842 - 1870)
  NCJR (c.1869 - 1874)
- Pices (Zodiac: Pisces)
  GWR Leo class 2-4-0 (1842 - 1874)
- Pilot
  BGR 2-4-0 (1844 - 1851)
- Pioneer
  GWR Standard Goods 0-6-0 (1861 - 1877)
- Pirate (Literary: The Pirate)
  GWR Waverley class 4-4-0 (1855 - 1876)
- Planet
  GWR Mather, Dixon 2-2-2 (1839 - 1840)
- Plato (Greek personality: Plato)
  GWR Banking class 0-6-0ST (1854 - 1883)
- Plutarch (Greek personality: Plutarch)
  GWR Standard Goods 0-6-0 (1862 - 1875)
- Pluto (Roman mythology: Pluto)
  GWR Fire Fly class 2-2-2 (1841 - 1870)
  SDR Gorgon class 4-4-0ST (1866 - 1892)
- Plutus (Greek mythology: Plutus)
  GWR Standard Goods 0-6-0 (1855 - 1874)
- Plym (Geography: River Plym)
  GWR Standard Goods 0-6-0 (1859 - 1875)
- Polar Star
  GWR Star class 2-2-2 (1840 - 1870)
- Pollux (Greek mythology: Castor and Pollux)
  GWR Fire Fly class 2-2-2 (1842 - 1866)
  SDR Eagle class 4-4-0ST (1865 - 1892)
  GWR Hawthorn class 2-4-0 (1866 - 1877)
  GWR Hawthorn class 2-4-0T (1877 - 1892)
- Premier
  GWR Mather, Dixon 2-2-2 (1837 - 1840)
  GWR Premier class 0-6-0 (1846 - 1869)
- Priam (Classical ruler: Priam)
  GWR Fire Fly class 2-2-2 (1842 - 1864)
  SDR Comet class 4-4-0ST (1851 - 1876)
- Prince
  GWR Prince class 2-2-2 (1846 - 1870)
  SDR 2-4-0ST (1871 - 1892)
- Princess
  SWMR 0-6-0ST (1863 - 1872)
- Prometheus (Greek mythology: Prometheus)
  GWR Iron Duke class 4-2-2 (1850 - 1887)
  GWR Rover class 4-2-2 (1888 - 1892)
- Proserpine (Greek mythology: Proserpine)
  GWR Fire Fly class 2-2-2 (1842 - 1873)
- Psyche (Greek mythology: Cupid and Psyche)
  GWR Standard Goods 0-6-0 (1853 - 1874)
- Pyracmon
  GWR Pyracmon class 0-6-0 (1847 - 1872)
- Python (Greek mythology: Python)
  SDR Buffalo class 0-6-0ST (1874 - 1892)

== Q ==
- Queen
  GWR Prince class 2-2-2 (1847 - 1870)
  TBR 0-4-0T (1868 - 1882)

== R ==
- Raven (Bird: Raven)
  SDR and TBR Raven class 0-4-0ST (1874 - 1892)
- Reading (Geography: Reading)
  GWR Swindon class 0-6-0 (1866 - 1874)
- Red Gauntlet (Literary: Redgauntlet)
  GWR Waverley class 4-4-0 (1855 - 1876)
- Red Star
  GWR Star class 2-2-2 (1840 - 1865)
- Redruth (Geography: Redruth)
  WCR 0-6-0ST (1871 - 1887)
- Regulus (Roman mythology: see Basilisk)
  GWR Standard Goods 0-6-0 (1862 - 1883)
- Remus (Roman mythology: Romulus and Remus)
  GWR Standard Goods 0-6-0 (1853 - 1879)
  SDR Remus class 0-6-0ST (1866 - 1886)
- Rennie (Famous engineer: John Rennie)
  GWR Victoria class 2-4-0 (1863 - 1878)
- Rhea (Greek mythology: Rhea)
  GWR Standard Goods 0-6-0 (1855 - 1872)
- Rhondda (Geography: River Rhondda)
  GWR Standard Goods 0-6-0 (1859 - 1877)
- Rising Star
  GWR Star class 2-2-2 (1840 - 1871)
- Rob Roy (Literary: Rob Roy)
  GWR Waverley class 4-4-0 (1855 - 1872)
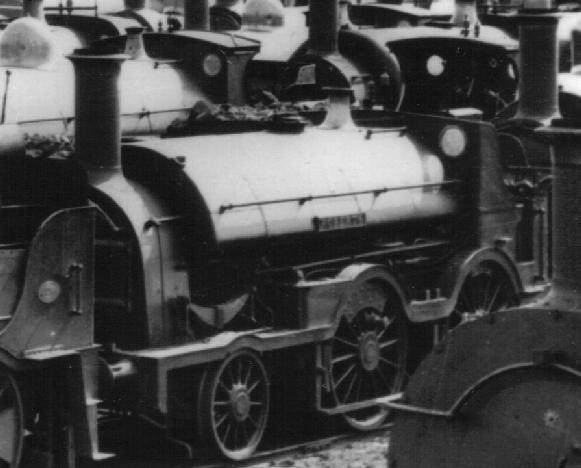
- Hawthorn 2-4-0T Roberts
  Roberts (Famous engineer: Richard Roberts)
  GWR Hawthorn class 2-4-0 (1865 - 1877)
  GWR Hawthorn class 2-4-0T (1877 - 1892)
- Robin Hood (Literature: Robin Hood)
  GWR Waverley class 4-4-0 (1855 - 1876)
  S&WR 0-6-0T (1868 - 1872)
- Rocket (Speed: Rocket)
  GWR Sun class 2-2-2 (1841 - 1870)
  SDR Comet class 4-4-0ST (1851 - 1877)
- Rougemont
  GWR Iron Duke class 4-2-2 (1848 - 1879)
- Romulus (Roman mythology: Romulus and Remus)
  GWR Standard Goods 0-6-0 (1853 - 1877)
  SDR Remus class 0-6-0ST (1866 - 1892)
- Rook (Bird: Rook)
  Raven class 0-4-0ST (1874 - 1892)
- Rosa
  LVR and SDR 4-4-0ST (1863 - 1874)
  SDR 0-6-0ST (1874 - 1885)
- Rose (Flower: Rose)
  GWR Metropolitan class 2-4-0T (1863 - 1877)
- Rover (Speed: Rover)
  GWR Iron Duke class 4-2-2 (1850 - 1871)
  GWR Rover class 4-2-2 (1871 - 1892)
- Royal Star
  GWR Star class 2-2-2 (1841 - 1871)
- Ruby
  GWR Standard Goods 0-6-0 (1854 - 1881)

== S ==
- Sagittarius (Zodiac: Sagittarius)
  GWR Leo class 2-4-0 (1842 - 1871)
- Salus (Greek mythology: Salus)
  GWR Standard Goods 0-6-0 (1854 - 1877)
- Sampson (Biblical: Sampson)
  GWR Hercules class 0-6-0 (1842 - 1870)
  SDR Tornado class 0-6-0ST (1855 - 1884)
- Sappho (Greek personality: Sappho)
  GWR Bogie class 4-4-0ST (1854 - 1873)
- Saturn (Roman mythology: Saturn)
  GWR Fire Fly class 2-2-2 (1841 - 1878)
- Saunders
  GWR Sir Watkin class 0-6-0T (1866 - 1872)
  SDR 0-6-0ST (1872 - 1892)
- Scorpio (Zodiac: Scorpio)
  GWR Leo class 2-4-0 (1841 - 1872)
- Sebastopol (British battle: Sebastopol)
  GWR Iron Duke class 4-2-2 (1855 - 1880)
  GWR Rover class 4-2-2 (1880 - 1892)
- Sedley
  SDR Gorgon class 4-4-0ST (1866 - 1885)
- Seneca (Roman personality: Seneca the Younger)
  GWR Bogie class 4-4-0ST (1854 - 1872)
- Severn (Geography: River Severn)
  GWR Standard Goods 0-6-0 (1857 - 1873)
- Severus (Roman personality: Septimius Severus)
  GWR Standard Goods 0-6-0 (1861 - 1878)
- Shah (Leader of people: Shah)
  GWR Metropolitan class 2-4-0T (1862 - 1872)
- Shamrock (Flower: Shamrock)
  GWR Metropolitan class 2-4-0T (1863 - 1877)
- Shannon (Geography: River Shannon)
  GWR Standard Goods 0-6-0 (1857 - 1880)
- Sharp (Famous engineer: Thomas Sharp)
  GWR Hawthorn class 2-4-0 (1866 - 1887)
- Shrewsbury (Geography: Shrewsbury)
  GWR Swindon class 0-6-0 (1866 - 1872)
- Shooting Star
  GWR Star class 2-2-2 (1841 - 1871)
- Sibyl (Greek mythology: Sibyl)
  GWR Standard Goods 0-6-0 (1854 - 1878)
- Sir Watkin
  GWR Sir Watkin class 0-6-0T (1866 - 1892)
- Sirius (Star: Sirius)
  GWR Standard Goods 0-6-0 (1861 - 1880)
- Slaughter (Famous engineer: Edward Slaughter)
  GWR Hawthorn class 2-4-0 (1865)
- Smeaton (Famous engineer: John Smeaton)
  GWR Victoria class 2-4-0 (1863 - 1877)
- Snake (Animal: Snake)
  GWR Haigh Foundry 2-2-2 (1838 - 1869)
- Sol (Sun: Sol)
  SDR Gorgon class 4-4-0ST (1866 - 1892)
- Sphinx (Egyptian mythology: Sphinx)
  GWR Standard Goods 0-6-0 (1854 - 1873)
- Spit Fire
  GWR Fire Fly class 2-2-2 (1840 - 1878)
- Stag (Fast animal: Stag)
  SDR Leopard class 4-4-0ST (1872 - 1893)
- Star
  NDR 2-2-2 (1855 - 1870)
- Statius (Roman personality: Statius)
  GWR Bogie class 4-4-0ST (1855 - 1871)
- Stentor (Greek personality: Stentor)
  GWR Fire Fly class 2-2-2 (1842 - 1867)
- Stephenson (Famous engineer: George Stephenson)
  GWR Victoria class 2-4-0 (1863 - 1878)
- Steropes (Greek mythology: Steropes)
  GWR Pyracmon class 0-6-0 (1848 - 1871)
- Stewart (Famous engineer: Charles Stewart)
  GWR Hawthorn class 2-4-0 (1866 - 1877)
  GWR Hawthorn class 2-4-0T (1877 - 1892)
- Stiletto
  GWR Sun class 2-2-2 (1841 - 1870)
- Stromboli (Geography: Stromboli)
  GWR Leo class 2-4-0 (1841 - 1870)
  SDR 0-6-0ST (1872 - 1889)
- Stroud (Geography: Stroud)
  BGR 2-2-2 (1844 - 1855)
- Sultan (Leader of people: Sultan)
  GWR Iron Duke class 4-2-2 (1847 - 1874)
  GWR Rover class 4-2-2 (1876 - 1892)
- Sun
  GWR Sun class 2-2-2 (1840 - 1873)
- Sunbeam
  GWR Sun class 2-2-2 (1840 - 1870)
- Swallow (Fast bird: Swallow)
  GWR Iron Duke class 4-2-2 (1849 - 1871)
  GWR Rover class 4-2-2 (1871 - 1892)
- Swindon (Geography: Swindon)
  GWR Swindon class 0-6-0 (1865 - 1874)
- Sylla
  GWR Standard Goods 0-6-0 (1862 - 1878)
- Sylph
  GWR Prince class 2-2-2 (1847 - 1870)

== T ==
- Talbot
  GWR Standard Goods 0-6-0 (1861 - 1877)
- Tamar (Geography: River Tamar)
  GWR Standard Goods 0-6-0 (1859 - 1880)
- Tantalus (Greek mythology: Tantalus)
  GWR Standard Goods 0-6-0 (1862 - 1876)
- Tartar (Classical peoples: Tartars)
  GWR Iron Duke class 4-2-2 (1848 - 1876)
  GWR Rover class 4-2-2 (1876 - 1892)
- Taurus (Zodiac: Taurus)
  GWR Leo class 2-4-0 (1841 - 1870)
  SDR 0-6-0ST (1869 - 1892)
- Taw (Geography: River Taw)
  NDR 2-2-2 (1855 - c.1860)
- Tay (Geography: River Tay)
  GWR Standard Goods 0-6-0 (1858 - 1881)
- Teign (Geography: River Teign)
  GWR Haigh Foundry 2-2-2 (1846 - 1851?)
- Telford (Famous engineer: Thomas Telford)
  GWR Victoria class 2-4-0 (1863 - 1879)
- Telica (Geography: Telica)
  GWR Premier class 0-6-0 (1846 - 1870)
- Thames (Geography: River Thames)
  GWR Standard Goods 0-6-0 (1854 - 1877)
- Theocritus (Greek personality: Theocritus)
  GWR Bogie class 4-4-0ST (1854 - 1873)
- Theseus (Greek mythology: Theseus)
  GWR Standard Goods 0-6-0 (1862 - 1880)
- Thistle (Flower: Thistle)
  GWR Metropolitan class 2-4-0T (1863 - 1874)
- Thunderer
  GWR Harrison 2-2-2+6 (1838 - 1839)
  GWR Caesar class 0-6-0 (1851 - 1874)
- Tiger (Powerful animal: Tiger)
  GWR Fire Fly class 2-2-2 (1840 - 1873)
  SDR Eagle class 4-4-0ST (1860 - 1884)
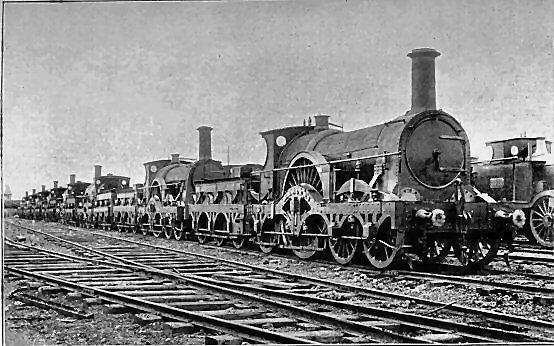
- Rover Class Timour
  Timour
  GWR Iron Duke class 4-2-2 (1849 - 1871)
  GWR Rover class 4-2-2 (1873 - 1892)
- Tiny
  SDR 0-4-0vb (1868 - 1883)
- Titan (Greek mythology: Titan)
  SDR Gorgon class 4-4-0ST (1866 - 1886)
- Tite
  NDR 2-2-2 (1856 - 1870)
- Tityos
  GWR Hercules class 0-6-0 (1842 - 1870)
- Tornado (Power: Tornado)
  GWR Iron Duke class 4-2-2 (1849 - 1881)
  SDR Tornado class 0-6-0ST (1854 - 1884)
  GWR Rover class 4-2-2 (1888 - 1892)
- Trafalgar (British battle: Battle of Trafalgar)
  GWR Standard Goods 0-6-0 (1853 - 1871)
- Trevethick (Famous engineer: Richard Trevithick)
  GWR Victoria class 2-4-0 (1863 - 1878)
- Tugwell
  BGR 2-4-0 (1844 - 1856)
- Tweed (Geography: River Tweed)
  GWR Standard Goods 0-6-0 (1857 - 1874)
- Tyne (Geography: River Tyne)
  GWR Standard Goods 0-6-0 (18759 -1877)
- Typhon (Greek mythology: Typhon)
  GWR Standard Goods 0-6-0 (1855 - 1879)

== U ==
- Ulysses (Literature: Ulysses)
  GWR Standard Goods 0-6-0 (1853 - 1872)
- Una
  LVR and SDR 0-6-0ST (1862 - 1892)

== V ==
- Venus (Roman mythology: Venus)
  GWR Charles Tayleur 2-2-2 (1838 - 1868)
  GWR Fire Fly class 2-2-2 (1841 - 1870)
  NDR 2-4-0 (1856 - 1870)
- Vesper (Roman mythology: Vesper)
  GWR Standard Goods 0-6-0 (1854 - 1879)
- Vesta (Roman mythology: Vesta)
  GWR Fire Fly class 2-2-2 (1841 - 1864)
- Vesuvius (Geography: Vesuvius)
  GWR Premier class 0-6-0 (1846 - 1870)
- Victor Emmanuel (Famous people: Victor Emmanuel II of Italy)
  GWR Victoria class 2-4-0 (1856 - 1878)
- Victoria (Famous people: Queen Victoria)
  GWR Victoria class 2-4-0 (1856 - 1879)
- Violet (Flower: Violet)
  GWR Metropolitan class 2-4-0T (1864 - 1872)
- Viper (Animal: Viper)
  GWR Haigh Foundry 2-2-2 (1838 - 1868)
- Virgil (Roman personality: Virgil)
  GWR Bogie class 4-4-0ST (1854 - 1873)
- Virgo (Zodiac: Virgo)
  GWR Leo class 2-4-0 (1841 - 1870)
- Vixen (Animal: Vixen)
  GWR Standard Goods 0-6-0 (1854 - 1879)
- Volcano (Power: Volcano)
  GWR Caesar class 0-6-0 (1851 - 1874)
  SDR Tornado class 0-6-0ST (1854 - 1877)
- Vulcan (Greek mythology: Vulcan)
  GWR Charles Tayleur 2-2-2 (1837 - 1868)
  SDR Buffalo class 0-6-0ST (1874 - 1892)
- Vulture (Bird: Vulture)
  GWR Fire Fly class 2-2-2 (1840 - 1870)

== W ==
- Warhawk
  GWR Standard Goods 0-6-0 (1861 - 1877)
- Warlock (Magician: Warlock)
  GWR Iron Duke class 4-2-2 (1848 - 1874)
  GWR Rover class 4-2-2 (1876 - 1892)
- Warrior (Power: Warrior)
  GWR Standard Goods 0-6-0 (1861 - 1872)
- Wasp (Insect: Wasp)
  GWR Metropolitan class 2-4-0T (1862 - 1875)
- Watt (Famous engineer: James Watt)
  GWR Victoria class 2-4-0 (1863 - 1880)
- Waverley (Literary: Waverley)
  GWR Waverley class 4-4-0 (1855 - 1876)
- Wear (Geography: River Wear)
  GWR Standard Goods 0-6-0 (1859 - 1879)
- Weasel (Animal: Weasel)
  SDR Owl class 0-4-0WT (1873 - 1882)
- Wellington (Famous people: Arthur Wellesley, 1st Duke of Wellington)
  GWR Standard Goods 0-6-0 (1853 - 1873)
- Western Star
  GWR Star class 2-2-2 (1841 - 1866)
- Whetham
  GWR Sir Watkin class 0-6-0T (1866 - 1889)
- Wickwar (Geography: Wickwar)
  BGR 2-2-2 (1844 - 1853)
- Wild Fire (Power: Wildfire)
  GWR Fire Fly class 2-2-2 (1840 - 1867)
- Windsor (Geography: Windsor)
  GWR Swindon class 0-6-0 (1866 - 1873)
- Witch
  GWR Prince class 2-2-2 (1846 - 1870)
- Wizard (Magician: Wizard)
  GWR Iron Duke class 4-2-2 (1848 - 1875)
- Wolf (Animal: Wolf)
  GWR Sun class 2-2-2 (1841 - 1873)
  SDR Eagle class 4-4-0ST (1859 - 1878)
- Wolverhampton (Geography: Wolverhampton)
  GWR Swindon class 0-6-0 (1866 - 1874)
- Wood
  GWR Hawthorn class 2-4-0 (1866 - 1892)
- Wye (Geography: River Wye)
  GWR Standard Goods 0-6-0 (1859 - 1879)

== X ==
- Xerxes (Classical ruler: Xerxes I of Persia)
  GWR Standard Goods 0-6-0 (1863 - 1882)

== Y ==
- Yataghan
  GWR Sun class 2-2-2 (1841 - 1871)
- Yeo (Geography: River Yeo
  NDR 2-2-2 (1857 - 1877)

== Z ==
- Zebra (Animal: Zebra)
  GWR Sun class 2-2-2 (1841 - 1871)
  SDR Gorgon class 4-4-0ST (1866 - 1892)
- Zetes (Greek mythology:Zetes)
  GWR Standard Goods 0-6-0 (1855 - 1877)
- Zina
  GWR Standard Goods 0-6-0 (1853 - 1874)

== See also ==
- List of GWR broad gauge locomotives
