= GWR Banking Class =

Class of British steam locomotives

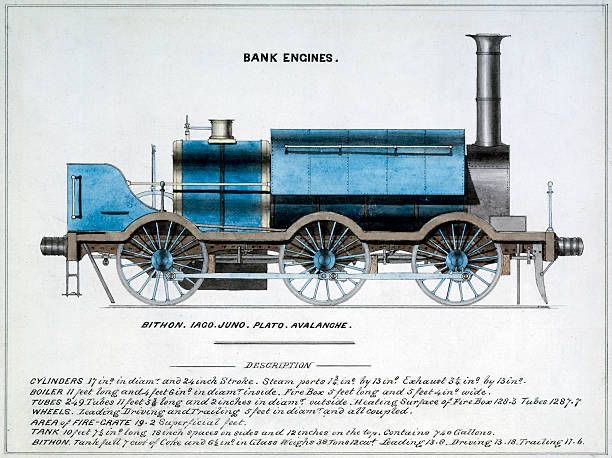
Type and origin
- Power type: Steam
- Designer: Daniel Gooch
- Builder: Great Western Railway (4); Stothert and Slaughter (1)
- Build date: 1846–1854
- Total produced: 5
Specifications
- Configuration
  - Whyte: 0-6-0ST
- Gauge: 7 ft 1/4 in (2,140 mm)
- Driver dia.: 5 ft 0 in (1,524 mm)
- Wheelbase: 16 ft 2 1/4 in (4.93 m)
- Cylinder size: 17 in × 24 in (432 mm × 610 mm)
Career
- Operators: Great Western Railway, South Devon Railway Company
- Class: Banking
- Number in class: 5
- Withdrawn: 1865–1889
- Disposition: All scrapped

The Banking Class were five 0-6-0ST Brunel gauge steam locomotives for assisting ("banking") trains up inclines on the Great Western Railway. Designed by Daniel Gooch, they were tank engine versions of his Standard Goods class, and mainly built at Swindon Works.

The last example was withdrawn in 1889.

== Locomotives ==
- Avalanche (1846–1865)
  Built in February 1846 and ceasing work in August 1865, Avalanche was not part of the Swindon-built Standard Goods locomotive build, but instead it was built by the Stothert and Slaughter and was similar to the Caesar class tender goods engines.
- Bithon (1854–1871)
- Iago (1852–1881)
- Juno (1852–1889)
  Juno was sold to the South Devon Railway in June 1872, where it was renamed Stromboli. It returned to the GWR upon absorption of the SDR in 1876, when it was given the number 2138 but retained its Stromboli name. It was the last survivor, being withdrawn in June 1889.
- Plato (1854–1883)
