= GWR Mather, Dixon locomotives =

Class of British broad-gauge 2-2-2 locomotives

Type and origin
- Power type: Steam
- Builder: Mather, Dixon & Co.
- Serial number: 40–41, 50–53
Specifications
- Configuration
  - Whyte: 2-2-2
- Gauge: 7 ft 1/4 in (2,140 mm)
- Leading dia.: 4 ft 6 in (1,372 mm)
- Driver dia.: 7 ft 0 in (2,134 mm)
- Trailing dia.: 4 ft 6 in (1,372 mm)
- Wheelbase: 13 ft 0 in (3.96 m)
- Cylinder size: 14.5 in × 14.5 in (368 mm × 368 mm)

The first 19 locomotives ordered by Isambard Kingdom Brunel for the Great Western Railway included six 2-2-2 Mather, Dixon locomotives. They were built by Mather, Dixon and Company, but were unsuccessful, and were rapidly replaced by the Star Class locomotives ordered by Daniel Gooch, once he had been appointed as the Locomotive Engineer.

== Locomotives ==
- Premier (Mather, Dixon 40; 1837 - 1840)
  This locomotive, along with Charles Tayleur's Vulcan was delivered by canal to West Drayton on 25 November 1837. It had 14.5-by-14.5-inch (368 mm × 368 mm) cylinders. The name, which means "first", was later used on the first locomotive built at Swindon, the first of the Premier Class goods locomotives.
- Ariel (Mather, Dixon 41; 1838 - 1840)
  This locomotive was the second of the Mather, Dixon locomotives to arrive and featured 14-by-14-inch (356 mm × 356 mm) cylinders. Ariel is, amongst other things, an angel and a fairy in William Shakespeare's The Tempest.
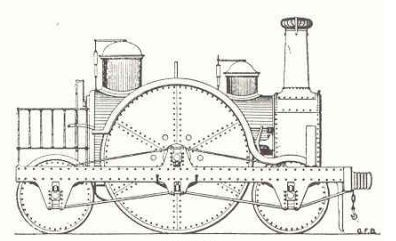
- Ajax showing the distinctive wheels constructed from iron plates; the other five had normal spoked wheels
  Ajax (Mather, Dixon 50; 1838 - 1840)
  This rather distinctive locomotive had plate 10 ft (3,048 mm) wheels instead of the more usual spoked ones, the carrying wheels being 5 ft (1,524 mm). The 14-by-20-inch (356 mm × 508 mm) cylinders were fed from a doubled-domed boiler. It was named after Ajax, a Greek mythological hero.
- Planet (Mather, Dixon 51; 1839 - 1840)
  This locomotive was delivered in December 1838 before being put to work in August 1839. After withdrawal it was used as a stationary boiler at Reading.
- Mercury (Mather, Dixon 52; 1839 - 1843)
  This locomotive was built to similar dimensions to Planet and also arrived in December 1838 but not accepted into service until 26 September 1839. It had 8 ft driving wheels and 16-by-20-inch (406 mm × 508 mm) cylinders. The name comes from a Roman god and was later carried by one of the Ariadne Class standard goods locomotives.
- Mars (Mather, Dixon 53; 1840 - 1840)
  This locomotive was built with 10 ft wheels, but did not enter service until they had been changed to 8 ft ones. The cylinders were 16 by 20 inches (406 mm × 508 mm). It was not successful, being delivered in April 1840 and withdrawn in December. It was named after Mars, the Roman god of war, and this was carried by one of the 1841-built Firefly Class locomotives.
