= GWR Sun Class =

Class of British steam locomotives

Sun
Type and origin
- Power type: Steam
- Designer: Daniel Gooch
- Builder: various
Specifications
- Configuration
  - Whyte: 2-2-2
- Gauge: 7 ft 1/4 in (2,140 mm)
- Leading dia.: 3 ft 6 in (1.067 m)
- Driver dia.: 6 ft 0 in (1.829 m)
- Trailing dia.: 3 ft 6 in (1.067 m)
- Wheelbase: 13 ft 8 in (4.166 m)
- Cylinder size: 14 in × 18 in (356 mm × 457 mm) dia × stroke
Career
- Operators: Great Western Railway
- Class: Sun

The Great Western Railway Sun Class were 2-2-2 broad gauge steam locomotives for passenger train work. This class was introduced into service between April 1840 and January 1842, and withdrawn between January 1864 and June 1879.

A smaller-wheeled version of the Fire Fly Class for working trains on the hilly sections of line west of Swindon, they did not prove heavy enough for the task and were later altered to become 2-2-2T tank locomotives. Later still Sun, Hesperus, Gazelle, Wolf, and Assagais were given higher pressure boilers and in this form ran until 1879; the last unrebuilt locomotive having been withdrawn in 1872.

From about 1865, the Sun Class was known as the Wolf Class.

== Locomotives ==
- Antelope (1841 - 1870)
  Built by Sharp, Roberts and Company, this locomotive was named after a fast animal, an antelope. It worked the first train from Teignmouth to Newton on the South Devon Railway on 30 December 1846.
- Assagais (1841 - 1875)
  Built by Stothert and Slaughter, this locomotive was named after an African spear
- Aurora (1840 - 1866)
  Built by R and W Hawthorn and Company with 14 in × 18 in (356 mm × 457 mm), dia × stroke, cylinders, this locomotive was named after the goddess Aurora.
- Comet (1840 - 1871)
  Built by R and W Hawthorn and Company with 14 in × 18 in (356 mm × 457 mm), dia × stroke, cylinders, this locomotive was named after a fast moving heavenly body, a comet.
- Creese (1842 - 1866)
  Built by Stothert and Slaughter, this locomotive was named after the Kris, a short wavy dagger.
- Djerid (1841 - 1870)
  Built by Stothert and Slaughter, this locomotive was named after a throwing spear, the djerid.
- Eclipse (1840 - 1864)
  Built by R and W Hawthorn and Company.
- Gazelle (1841 - 1879)
  Built by Sharp, Roberts and Company, this locomotive was named after the swift animal, gazelle.
- Giraffe (1841 - 1872)
  Built by Sharp, Roberts and Company, this locomotive was named after the tall animal, giraffe.
- Hesperus (1841 - 1876)
  Built by R and W Hawthorn and Company with 14 in × 18 in (356 mm × 457 mm), dia × stroke, and an experimental boiler, it was later rebuilt with a conventional one. It was named after Hesperus a character in Roman mythology.
- Javelin (1841 - 1870)
  Built by Stothert and Slaughter, this locomotive was named after a thrown weapon, a javelin.
- Lance (1841 - 1870)
  Built by Stothert and Slaughter, the name is that of a thrown weapon, a lance.
- Meridian (1840 - 1870)
  Built by R and W Hawthorn and Company.
- Meteor (1840 - 1864)
  Built by R and W Hawthorn and Company, this locomotive was named after a fast moving heavenly body, a Meteor.
- Rocket (1841 - 1870)
  Built by Stothert and Slaughter, this locomotive was named after a swift projectile, a rocket.
- Stiletto (1841 - 1870)
  Built by Stothert and Slaughter.
- Sun (1840 - 1873)
  Built by R and W Hawthorn and Company, this locomotive was named after the Sun.
- Sunbeam (1840 - 1870)
  Built by R and W Hawthorn and Company.
- Wolf (1841 - 1873)
  Built by Sharp, Roberts and Company, this locomotive was named after the strong animal, wolf.
- Yataghan (1841 - 1871)
  Built by Stothert and Slaughter.
- Zebra (1841 - 1871)
  Built by Sharp, Roberts and Company, this locomotive was named after the fast animal, the zebra.
