= GWR Prince Class =

Class of British steam locomotives

Prince or Queen Class
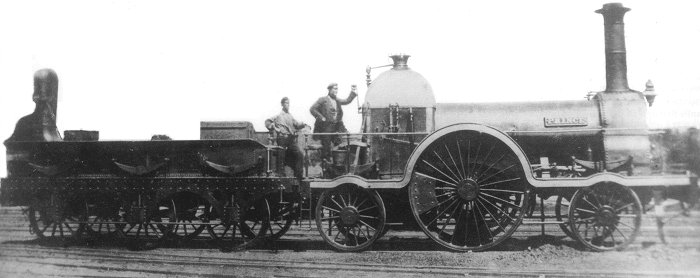
Type and origin
- Power type: Steam
- Designer: Daniel Gooch
- Builder: Great Western Railway
Specifications
- Configuration
  - Whyte: 2-2-2
- Gauge: 7 ft 1/4 in (2,140 mm)
- Leading dia.: 4 ft 0 in (1,219 mm)
- Driver dia.: 7 ft 6 in (2,286 mm)
- Trailing dia.: 4 ft 0 in (1,219 mm)
- Wheelbase: 14 ft 10 in (4,521 mm)
- Cylinder size: 16 in × 24 in (406 mm × 610 mm), dia × stroke
Career
- Operators: Great Western Railway
- Class: Prince
- Withdrawn: 1870

The Great Western Railway Prince Class 2-2-2 broad gauge steam locomotives for passenger train work. This class was introduced into service between August 1846 and March 1847, and withdrawn between January and September 1870.

From about 1865, the Prince Class locomotives became part of the Priam Class, along with the Fire Fly Class locomotives.

== Locomotives ==
- Moose (1846–1870)
  Named after the animal, the elk.
- Peri (1846–1870)
  A peri is a fallen angel in Persian mythology.
- Prince (1846–1870)
  Named in honour of Albert, Prince Consort to Queen Victoria.
- Queen (1847–1870)
  Named in honour of Queen Victoria
- Sylph (1847–1870)
  A sylph is an invisible, mythological creature.
- Witch (1846–1870)
  This locomotive was fitted with slightly larger 7 ft 6 in (2,286 mm) driving wheels. It was named after a female practitioner of witchcraft, a witch.
