= GWR Victoria Class =

Class of British steam locomotives

Victoria Class
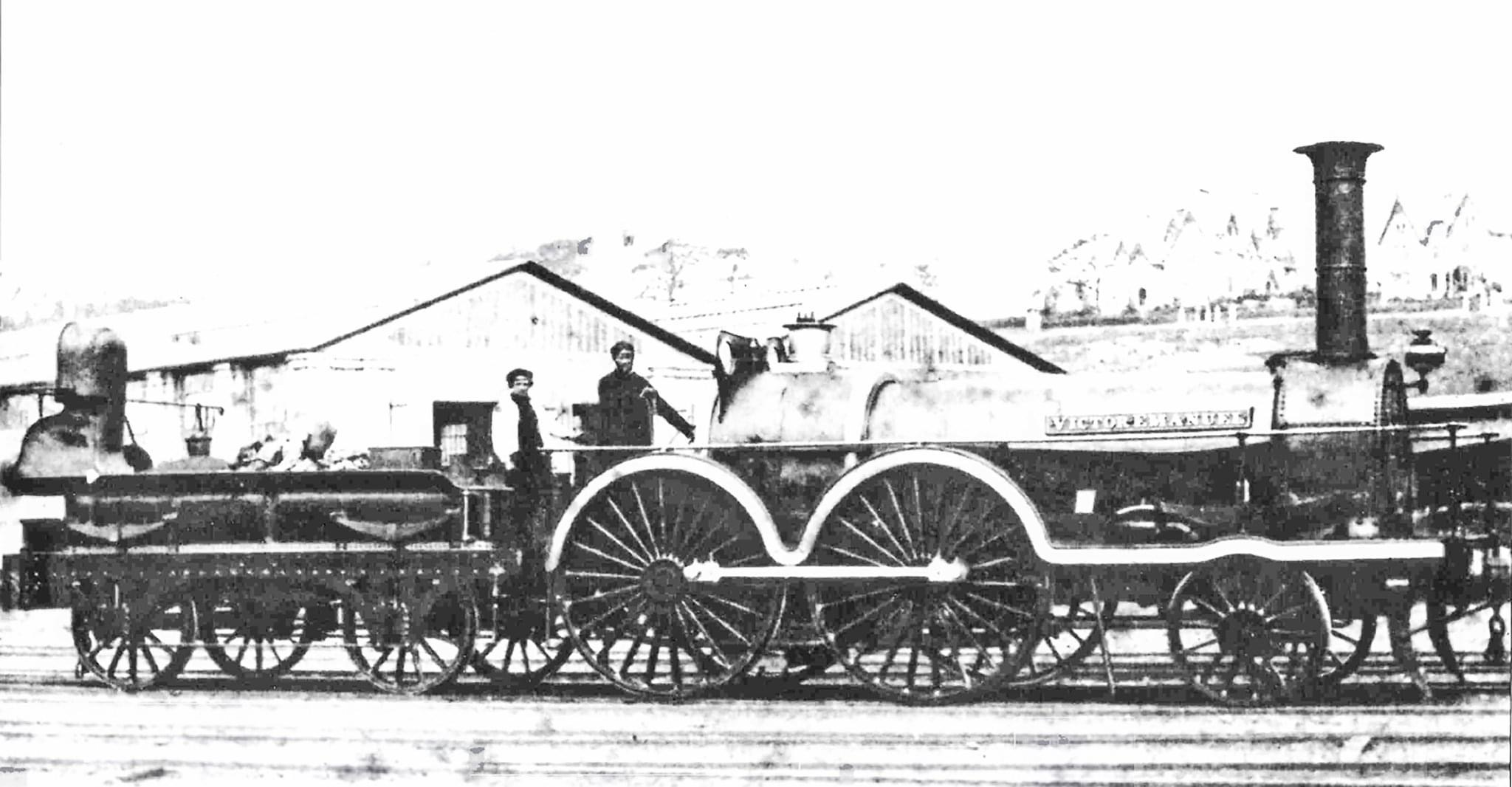
Type and origin
- Power type: Steam
- Designer: Daniel Gooch
- Builder: Great Western Railway
Specifications
- Configuration
  - Whyte: 2-4-0
- Gauge: 7 ft 1/4 in (2,140 mm)
- Leading dia.: 4 ft 0 in (1,219 mm)
- Driver dia.: 6 ft 6 in (1,981 mm)
- Wheelbase: 15 ft 6 in (4,724 mm)
- Cylinder size: 16 in × 24 in (406 mm × 610 mm), dia × stroke
Career
- Operators: Great Western Railway
- Class: Victoria

The Great Western Railway Victoria Class were 2-4-0 broad gauge steam locomotives for passenger train work. This class was introduced into service in two batches between August 1856 and May 1864. They were all withdrawn between 1876 and December 1880.

The first eight locomotives were named after ruling heads of state, but the remaining locomotives received the names of famous engineers, starting with the railway's own Isambard Kingdom Brunel. This theme was continued with the Hawthorn Class that followed.

== Locomotives ==
- Abdul Medjid (1856 - 1877)
  Named after Abdulmejid I of Turkey.
- Alexander (1856 - 1878)
  Named in honour of Alexander II of Russia.
- Brindley (1863 - 1879)
  Named after James Brindley, the first canal builder.
- Brunel (1863 - 1879)
  This locomotive worked the last broad gauge train in Wales on 11 May 1872. It was named after the Great Western Railway's much respected engineer, Isambard Kingdom Brunel, who had died in 1859.
- Fulton (1863 - 1876)
  Named after Robert Fulton, who developed steam-powered ships.
- Leopold (1856 - 1877)
  Named in honour of Leopold I of Belgium.
- Locke (1863 - 1881)
  Named after the railway engineer, Joseph Locke.
- Napoleon (1856 - 1880)
  Named in honour of Napoleon I of France
- Oscar (1856 - 1880)
  Named for King Oscar I of Sweden.
- Otho (1856 - 1880)
  Named in honour of King Otto of Greece.
- Rennie (1863 - 1878)
  Named after the engineer, John Rennie the Younger.
- Smeaton (1863 - 1877)
  Named after the engineer, John Smeaton.
- Stephenson (1863 - 1878)
  Named after Robert Stephenson.
- Telford (1863 - 1879)
  Named after the engineer, Thomas Telford.
- Trevethick (1863 - 1878)
  Named after Richard Trevithick who built the first working railway locomotives.
- Victor Emmanuel (1856 - 1878)
  Named after Victor Emmanuel II of Italy.
- Victoria (1856 - 1879)
  On 26 August 1862 Victoria ran away descending towards Weymouth, it crashed through the buffers and ended up in the street outside the station. It was named in honour of Queen Victoria.
- Watt (1863 - 1880)
  Named after James Watt.
