= GWR Caesar Class =

Class of British steam locomotives

Great Western Railway Caesar Class
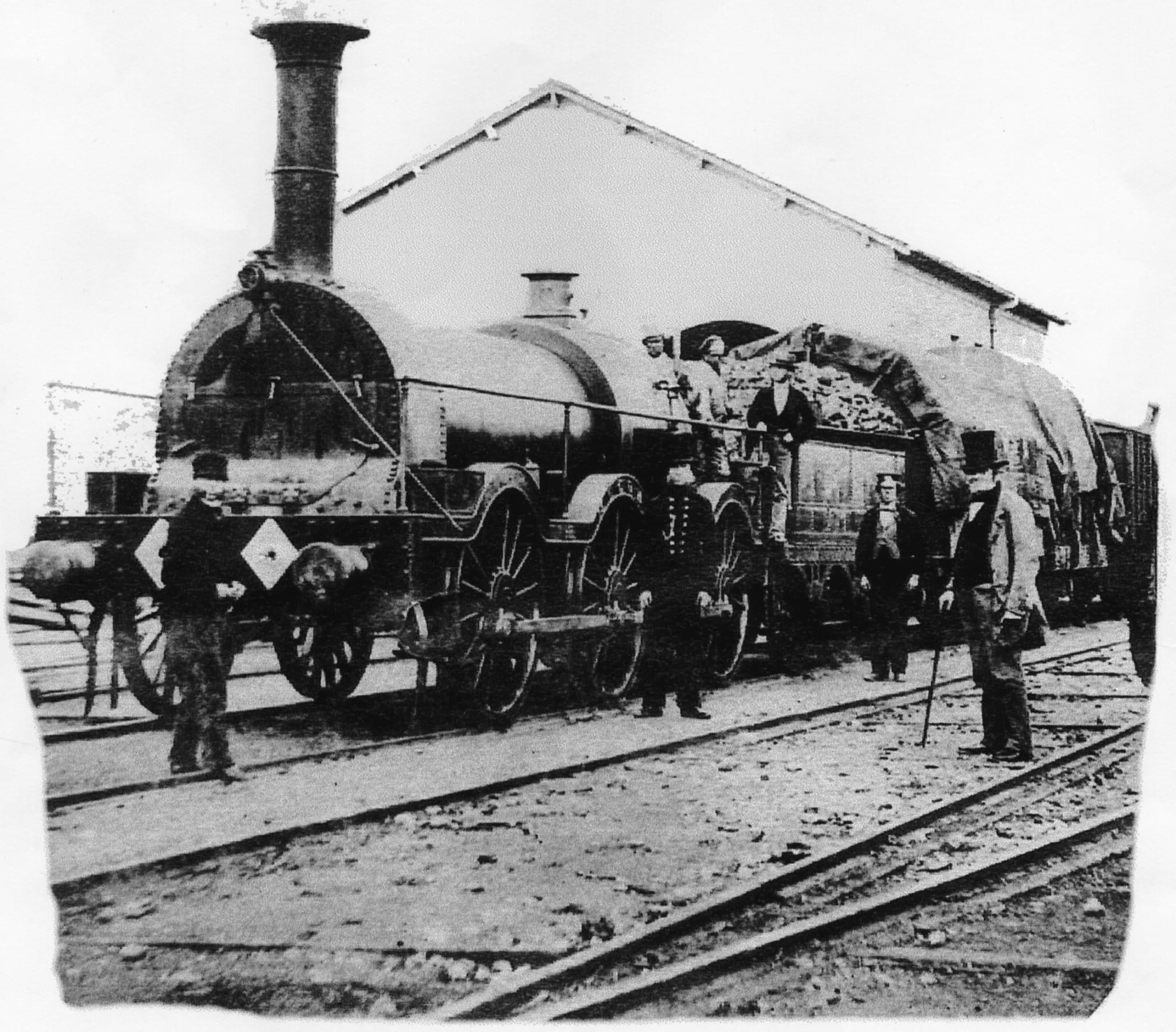
Type and origin
- Power type: Steam
- Designer: Daniel Gooch
- Builder: Great Western Railway
- Build date: 1851-1852
- Total produced: 8
Specifications
- Configuration
  - Whyte: 0-6-0ST
- Gauge: 7 ft 1/4 in (2,140 mm)
- Driver dia.: 4 ft 9 in (1,448 mm)
- Wheelbase: 15 ft 5 in (4.70 m)
- Cylinder size: 17 in × 24 in (432 mm × 610 mm)
Career
- Operators: Great Western Railway
- Class: Caesar
- Withdrawn: 1871-1880
- Disposition: All scrapped

The Great Western Railway Caesar Class were 0-6-0 broad gauge steam locomotives. They were designed by Daniel Gooch for goods train work. This class was introduced into service between June 1851 and February 1852, and withdrawn between June 1871 and June 1880.

From about 1865, the Caesar Class was expanded to include locomotives formerly known as Ariadne Class, Caliph Class, or GWR Pyracmon Class.

== Names ==
Build date	Retire date	Name	Notes
1851	1880	Caesar	
1851	1872	Dido	
1852(?)	?	Druid	
1851	1874	Florence	
1851	1871	Hero	
1851	1872	Nora Creina	The name comes from the subject of Thomas Moore's poem Lesbia has a beaming eye
1851	1874	Thunderer	This name had previously been carried by a GWR 0-4-0+6 locomotive in 1838.
1851	1874	Volcano	
