= GWR Hercules Class =

Class of British steam locomotives

Hercules
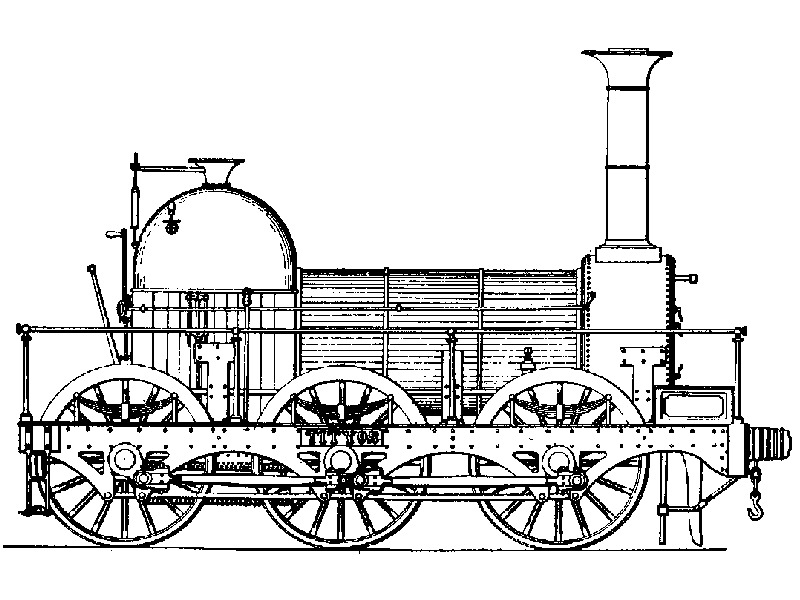
Type and origin
- Power type: Steam
- Designer: Daniel Gooch
- Builder: Nasmyth, Gaskell and Company
Specifications
- Configuration
  - Whyte: 0-6-0
- Gauge: 7 ft 1/4 in (2,140 mm)
- Driver dia.: 5 ft 0 in (1,524 mm)
- Wheelbase: 12 ft 6 in (3.81 m)
- Cylinder size: 15 in × 18 in (381 mm × 457 mm) dia × stroke
Career
- Operators: Great Western Railway
- Class: Hercules

The GWR Hercules Class were four broad gauge steam locomotives for the Great Western Railway. They were its first 0-6-0 locomotives, being built in 1842 by Nasmyth, Gaskell and Company stemming from the company's need for goods locomotives. This resulted in the last four Firefly Class locomotives being modified while still in production. From about 1865, the Hercules Class locomotives became part of the Fury Class, along with the Premier Class locomotives. They were withdrawn between 1870 and 1871.

== Locomotives ==
- Goliah (1842 - 1871)
  This locomotives was named after the Biblical giant, Goliah.
- Hercules (1842 - 1870)
  This locomotive was named after the Greek mythological strongman, Hercules.
- Sampson (1842 - 1870)
  This locomotive was named after the Biblical strongman, Sampson.
- Tityos (1842 - 1870)
  This locomotive was named after Tityos, a giant in Greek mythology.

== Accidents and incidents ==
- On 27 June 1849, the boiler of Goliah exploded whilst it was hauling a freight train on the South Devon Railway at Plympton. One person was killed.
