= GWR Premier Class =

Class of British broad gauge 0-6-0 locomotives

Premier
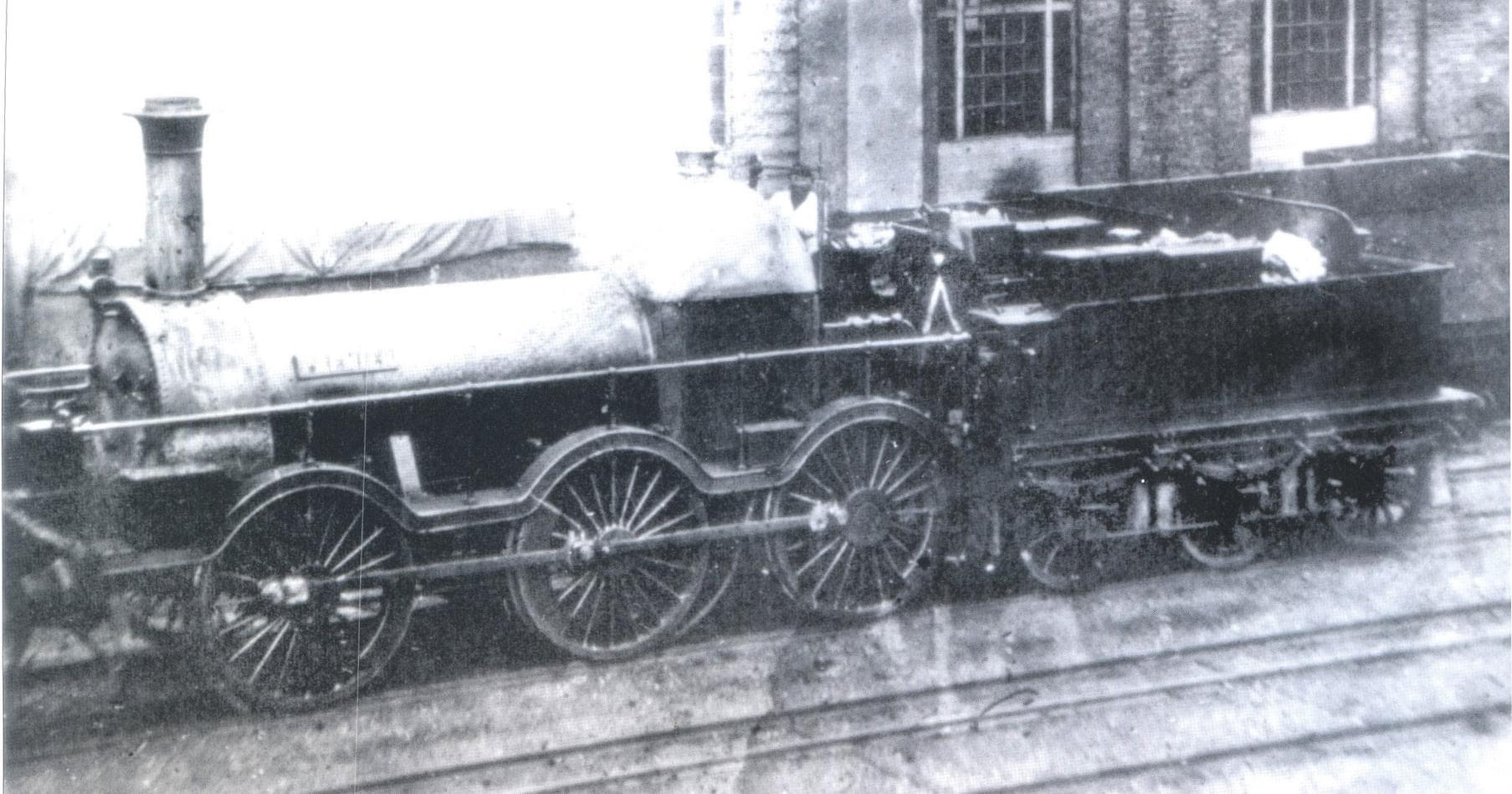
Type and origin
- Power type: Steam
- Designer: Daniel Gooch
- Builder: Great Western Railway
Specifications
- Configuration
  - Whyte: 0-6-0
- Gauge: 7 ft 1/4 in (2,140 mm)
- Driver dia.: 5 ft 0 in (1,524 mm)
- Wheelbase: 14 ft 5 1/2 in (4,407 mm)
- Cylinder size: 16 in × 24 in (406 mm × 610 mm), dia × stroke
Career
- Operators: Great Western Railway
- Class: Premier
- Withdrawn: 1866 - 1872
- Disposition: All scrapped

The Great Western Railway Premier Class 0-6-0 broad gauge steam locomotives for goods train work. This class was introduced into service between February 1846 and May 1847, and withdrawn between March 1866 and June 1872.

These were the first locomotives built at Swindon railway works, albeit with boilers supplied to the company. They were larger than the existing Hercules Class but still with haycock fireboxes. Just six months after the last one left Swindon, production of the even larger Pyracmon Class had started.

From about 1865, the Premier Class locomotives became part of the Fury Class, along with the Hercules Class locomotives.

== Locomotives ==
- Ajax (1846–1871)
  Ajax is the name of a Greek mythological hero. HMS Ajax formed part of Admiral Nelson's fleet at the Battle of Trafalgar in 1805. The name had previously been carried on one of the unsuccessful Mather, Dixon locomotives built in 1838.
- Argo (1846–1855)
  The original Argo was Jason's ship in Greek mythology.
- Bellerophon (1846–1870)
  Bellerophon is the name of a Greek mythological hero. HMS Bellerophon was one of the most famous ships at the Battle of Trafalgar in 1805.
- Bergion (1847–1870)
  This locomotive was named after Bergion, son of Poseidon in Greek mythology.
- Briarcus (1847–1870)
  This locomotive was named after Briarcus, a minor character in Greek mythology.
- Brontes (1847–1872)
  Brontes is one of the Greek mythical monsters known as the Cyclops. His name means 'thunder'.
- Dreadnought (1846–1871)
  This is a common name for large British naval ships, HMS Dreadnought was serving when this locomotive was built.
- Fury (1846–1871)
  The furies were the female personification of vengeance in Roman mythology.
- Jason (1847–1870)
  This locomotive was named after Jason. a hero of Greek mythology.
- Premier (1846–1869)
  The name, which means first, had previously been carried on one of the Mather, Dixon locomotives of 1838.
- Telica (1846–1870)
  The volcano Telica is in Nicaragua.
- Vesuvius (1846–1870)
  This locomotive was named after Vesuvius, a famous volcano in Italy.
