= GWR Bogie Class =

Class of British steam locomotives

The Great Western Railway (GWR) Bogie Class 4-4-0ST were broad gauge steam locomotives for passenger train work. The first two locomotives of this class were introduced into service in August/September 1849, with the remainder following between June 1854 and March 1855. All but one were withdrawn between October 1871 and 1873, with the final locomotive being withdrawn in December 1880.

== Corsair and Brigand ==
GWR Bogie Class
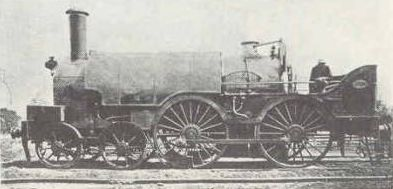
- Horace c.1854
Type and origin
- Power type: Steam
- Designer: Daniel Gooch
- Builder: Great Western Railway (2); R and W Hawthorn (13)
- Build date: 1849 (GWR-built); 1854-1855 (R and W Hawthorn built)
- Total produced: 15
Specifications
- Configuration
  - Whyte: 4-4-0ST
- Gauge: 7 ft 1/4 in (2,140 mm)
- Leading dia.: 3 ft 6 in (1,067 mm)
- Driver dia.: 6 ft 0 in (1,829 mm) (GWR built); 5 ft 9 in (1,753 mm) (R and W Hawthorn built)
- Wheelbase: 18 ft 2 in (5.54 m) (GWR built); 18 ft 0 in (5.49 m) (R and W Hawthorn built)
- Cylinder size: 17 in × 24 in (432 mm × 610 mm)
Career
- Operators: Great Western Railway
- Class: Bogie
- Number in class: 15
- Withdrawn: 1871-1873, 1880
- Disposition: All scrapped

The first two locomotives were built at Swindon Works in 1849 for working trains on the steep and tightly-curved South Devon Railway which at that time was operated by locomotives from the Great Western Railway. The frames only ran from the front of the flangeless forward driving wheels to the rear buffer beam. The bogie swivelled in a ball-and-socket joint, riveted to a gusset under the boiler barrel. Early examples were fitted with sledge brakes, mounted between the driving wheels, but these were later replaced with a conventional brake acting on just one coupled wheel. The operation of South Devon Railway had been contracted by that company to Messrs Evans and Geach from 1851 – using new 4-4-0STs designed by Daniel Gooch – and so the Bogie Class found use on other parts of the Great Western network. In 1855 additional locomotives were built for the GWR by R and W Hawthorn.

== Naming ==
Build date	Retire date	Name	Builder	Other notes
1849	1873	Brigand	GWR	After it was withdrawn, this locomotive was sold to Edwards & Suter but found its way back to Swindon Works in 1878 where it was broken up.
1849	1873	Corsair	GWR	On withdrawal it was sold to the Cilely Colliery at Tonyrefail.
1855	1871	Euripides	Hawthorn	
1855	1872	Hesiod	Hawthorn	
1854	1873	Homer	Hawthorn	
1854	1880	Horace	Hawthorn	
1854	1873	Juvenal	Hawthorn	The locomotive was sold to Dobson, Brown & Adams in 1874.
1855	1872	Lucan	Hawthorn	
1854	1872	Lucretius	Hawthorn	
1854	1873	Ovid	Hawthorn	
1854	1873	Sappho	Hawthorn	The locomotive was sold to the Staveley Coal and Iron Company.
1854	1872	Seneca	Hawthorn	
1855	1871	Statius	Hawthorn	
1854	1873	Theocritus	Hawthorn	The locomotive was sold to the Staveley Coal and Iron Company in 1874.
1854	1873	Virgil	Hawthorn	
