= GWR Hawthorn Class =

Class of British steam locomotives

The Great Western Railway Hawthorn Class were 2-4-0 broad gauge steam locomotives for passenger train work. This class was introduced into service in 1865, a development of the Victoria Class.

Twenty locomotives were ordered from Slaughter, Grüning and Company and given the names of famous engineers. The remaining six were built by the railway itself at Swindon and given names previously carried by the Firefly Class locomotives that they replaced.

Withdrawals started in March 1876 but the following year ten were rebuilt as 2-4-0T locomotives; the last survived until the end of the broad gauge on 21 May 1892.

== Tender locomotives ==
Hawthorn
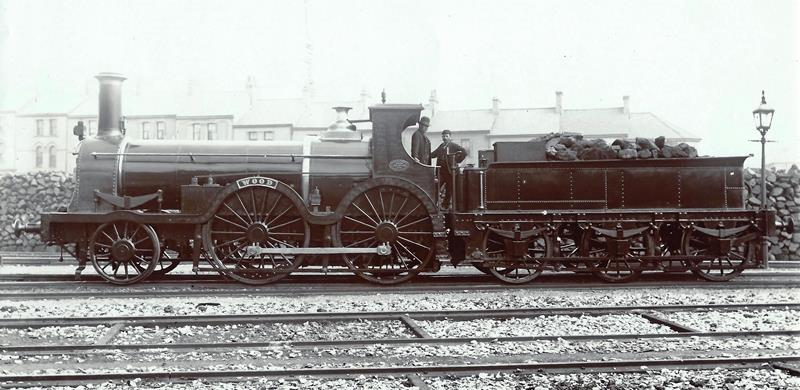
- Wood at Plymouth c.1890
Type and origin
- Power type: Steam
- Designer: Joseph Armstrong
- Builder: Slaughter, Grüning & Co. and Great Western Railway
Specifications
- Configuration
  - Whyte: 2-4-0
- Gauge: 7 ft 1/4 in (2,140 mm)
- Leading dia.: 4 ft 0 in (1.219 m)
- Driver dia.: 6 ft 0 in (1.829 m)
- Wheelbase: 18 ft 3 in (5.563 m)
- Cylinder size: 16 in × 24 in (406 mm × 610 mm), dia × stroke
Career
- Operators: Great Western Railway
- Class: Hawthorn
- Withdrawn: 1876 - 1892

- Acheron (1866 - 1887)
  This locomotive was built by the Great Western Railway at Swindon. The name Acheron comes from a Greek river and had previously been carried by a Fire Fly Class locomotive.
- Beyer (1865 - 1877)
  Built by Slaughter, Grüning and Company. It was named after Charles Beyer, a founder partner in the Beyer, Peacock and Company locomotive manufacturing firm.
- Blenkensop (1865 - 1892)
  Built by Slaughter, Grüning and Company, this locomotive was named after John Blenkinsop, a mining engineer and pioneer of railway locomotives.
- Bury (1865 - 1877)
  Built by Slaughter, Grüning and Company. This locomotive was named after Edward Bury of Bury, Curtis, and Kennedy.
- Cerberus (1866 - 1877)
  This locomotive was built at Swindon. Cerebus was a character in Greek mythology and the name had previously been carried by a Fire Fly Class locomotive.
- Dewrance (1865 - 1892)
  Built by the Slaughter, Grüning and Company, it was named after John Dewrance, an early railway engineer.
- Fenton (1865 - 1892)
  Built by Slaughter, Grüning and Company. This locomotive was named after James Fenton of Fenton, Murray and Jackson.
- Foster (1865 - 1876)
  Built by Slaughter, Grüning and Company, it was probably named after James Foster of Foster, Rastrick and Company.
- Gooch (1865 - 1892)
  Built by Slaughter, Grüning and Company, this locomotive was named after Daniel Gooch, the first locomotive engineer of the Great Western Railway.
- Hackworth (1865 - 1892)
  Built by Slaughter, Grüning and Company, This locomotive was named after Timothy Hackworth, a famous engineer.
- Hawk (1865 - 1892)
  This locomotive was built at Swindon. A hawk is a kind of bird of prey; the name was later carried by a Fire Fly Class locomotive.
- Hawthorn (1865 - 1876)
  Built by Slaughter, Grüning and Company, it was named for the founder of R and W Hawthorn and Company
- Hedley (1865 - 1877)
  Built by Slaughter, Grüning and Company, it was probably named after William Hedley, one of the pioneers of the steam locomotive.
- John Gray (1865 - 1876)
  Built by Slaughter, Grüning and Company, named after John Gray, the engineer of the London and Brighton Railway.
- Melling (1865 - 1877)
  Built by Slaughter, Grüning and Company, it was probably named after Richard Melling, a canal engineer.
- Murdoch (1865 - 1892)
  Built by Slaughter, Grüning and Company. This locomotive was named after William Murdoch.
- Ostrich (1865 - 1877)
  This locomotive was built at Swindon. An ostrich is a large flightless bird; the name had previously been carried by a Fire Fly Class locomotive.
- Peacock (1866 - 1875)
  This locomotive was built by the Avonside Engine Company. This locomotive was named after Richard Peacock, a founder partner in the Beyer, Peacock and Company locomotive manufacturing firm.
- Penn (1866 - 1877)
  This locomotive was built by the Avonside Engine Company and named after John Penn, who served two terms as a president of the Institution of Mechanical Engineers.
- Phlegethon (1866 - 1887)
  This locomotive was built at Swindon. Phlegethon was one of the five rivers of the Greek underworld and the name had previously been carried by a Fire Fly Class locomotive.
- Pollux (1866 - 1877)
  This locomotive was built at Swindon. Pollux was the twin of Castor in Greek mythology; the name had previously been carried on a Fire Fly Class locomotive.
- Roberts (1865 - 1877)
  Built by Slaughter, Grüning and Company. It was named after Richard Roberts of Sharp, Roberts and Company
- Sharp (1866 - 1887)
  This locomotive was built by the Avonside Engine Company, it was named after Thomas Sharp of Sharp, Stewart and Company.
- Slaughter (1865 - 1892)
  Built by Slaughter, Grüning and Company, this locomotive was initially named after Edward Slaughter one of its partners, but was soon renamed Avonside when the business changed its name to become the Avonside Engine Company.
- Stewart (1866 - 1877)
  This locomotive was built by the Avonside Engine Company, and named after Charles Stewart of Sharp, Stewart and Company.
- Wood (1866 - 1892)
  This locomotive was built by the Avonside Engine Company. It was probably named after Frederick Wood, a railway engineer.

== Tank locomotives ==
Hawthorn (tank)
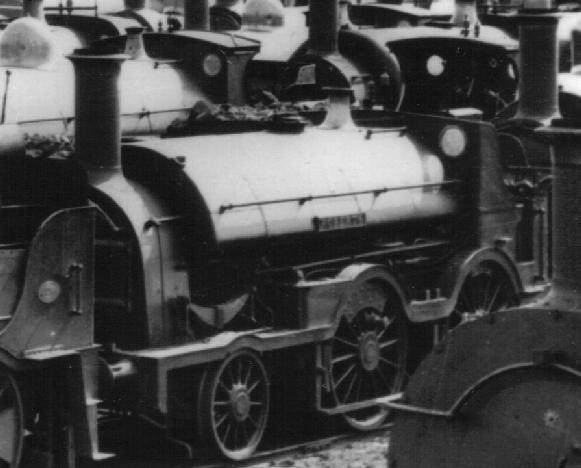
- Roberts at Swindon after withdrawal
Type and origin
- Power type: Steam
- Designer: Joseph Armstrong
- Builder: Great Western Railway
Specifications
- Configuration
  - Whyte: 2-4-0T
- Gauge: 7 ft 1/4 in (2,140 mm)
- Leading dia.: 4 ft 0 in (1.219 m)
- Driver dia.: 5 ft 0 in (1.524 m)
- Wheelbase: 15 ft 3 in (4.648 m)
- Cylinder size: 17 in × 24 in (432 mm × 610 mm), dia × stroke
Career
- Operators: Great Western Railway
- Class: Hawthorn

- Beyer (1877 - 1887)
- Bury (1877 - 1892)
- Cerberus (1877 - 1892)
- Hedley (1877 - 1892)
  After withdrawal, Hedley was used as a stationary boiler at Conwil Quarry from 1893, then was moved to Neath in 1905. It ceased work in 1914 but was not cut up - at Swindon - until 1929.
- Melling (1877 - 1892)
- Ostrich (1877 - 1892)
- Penn (1877 - 1892)
- Pollux (1877 - 1892)
- Roberts (1877 - 1892)
- Stewart (1877 - 1892)
  This locomotive worked the last broad gauge train on the Falmouth branch on 20 May 1892, in company with Vulcan.
