= GWR Metropolitan Class =

Class of British steam locomotives

GWR Metropolitan class
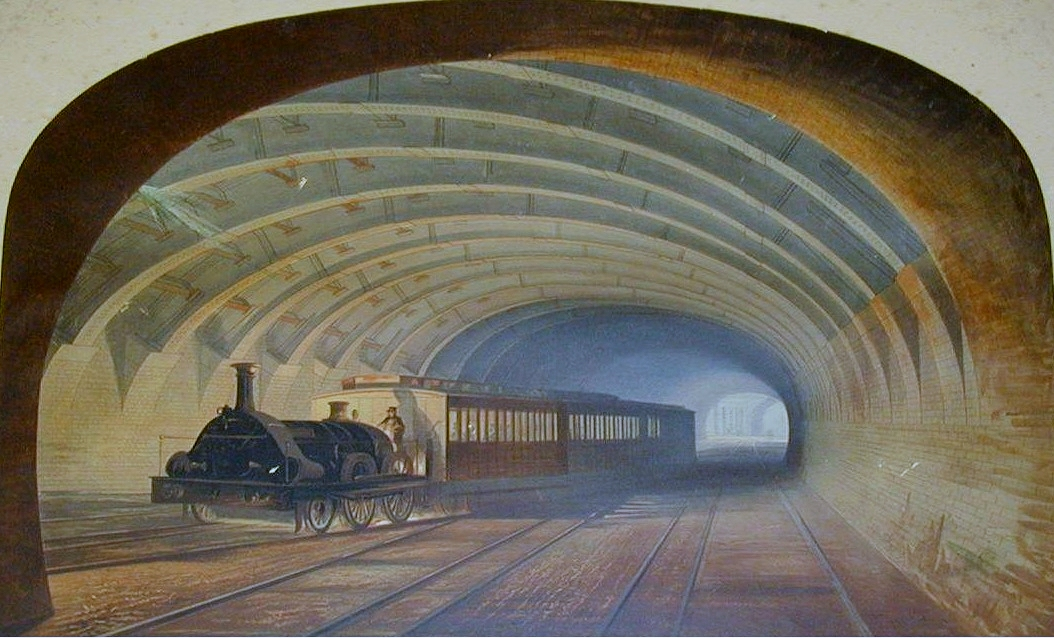
- Metropolitan tank locomotive beneath Praed Street. looking towards Edgware Road
Type and origin
- Power type: Steam
- Designer: Daniel Gooch
- Builder: Kitson and Company (6); Vulcan Foundry (6); Swindon Works (10)
- Serial number: Kitson: 976–981; VF: 484–489
- Build date: 1862–1864
- Total produced: 22
Specifications
- Configuration
  - Whyte: 2-4-0T, seven rebuilt as 2-4-0
- Gauge: 7 ft 1/4 in (2,140 mm)
- Leading dia.: 3 ft 6 in (1,067 mm)
- Driver dia.: 6 ft 0 in (1,829 mm)
- Wheelbase: 15 ft 6 in (4,724 mm)
- Water cap.: 718 imp gal (3,260 L; 862 US gal)
- Cylinders: Two, outside
- Cylinder size: 16 in × 24 in (406 mm × 610 mm)
Career
- Operators: Great Western Railway
- Withdrawn: 1871–1877
- Disposition: All scrapped

The Great Western Railway Metropolitan Class 2-4-0T broad gauge steam locomotives with condensing apparatus were used for working trains on the Metropolitan Railway. The equipment was later removed, though the class continued to work suburban trains on GWR lines in London. The class was introduced into service between June 1862 and October 1864, and withdrawn between June 1871 and December 1877.

Twenty-two locomotives were built to the 2-4-0T tank locomotive arrangement from 1862 to 1864. The locomotives were built by three workshops, each with a different naming system. The first two batches were delivered concurrently by the Vulcan Foundry (named after insects), and Kitson & Co. (named after foreign monarchs). These were followed by a batch from the railway's own workshops at Swindon, that were named after flowers.

Around 1865, seven of the class were rebuilt as 2-4-0 tender locomotives: Hornet, Mogul, Azalia, Lily, Myrtle, Violet, Laurel.

All were withdrawn between 1871 (Czar) and 1877 (Rose & Shamrock).

== Locomotives ==
- Azalia (1864–1872)
  Built at Swindon, it ran as a 2-4-0 tender locomotive. Named after the flower, the azalea.
- Bee (1862–1874)
  Built by the Vulcan Foundry. Named after the insect, the bee.
- Bey (1862–1872)
  Built by Kitson & Co. Named after a bey who was a Turkish chieftain.
- Camelia (1863–1876)
  Built at Swindon. Named after the flower, the camellia.
- Czar (1862–1871)
  Built by Kitson & Co. The czar was the emperor of Russia.
- Fleur-de-Lis (1863–1872)
  Built at Swindon. Named after a symbolic flower, the fleur-de-lis.
- Gnat (1862–1874)
  Built by the Vulcan Foundry. Named after the insect, the gnat.
- Hornet (1862–1873)
  Built by the Vulcan Foundry, it was later altered to a 2-4-0 tender locomotive. Named after the insect, the hornet.
- Kaiser (1862–1872)
  Built by Kitson & Co. A kaiser was an emperor of Austria or Germany.
- Khan (1862–1872)
  Built by Kitson & Co. A khan was an Asian leader.
- Laurel (1864–1872)
  Built at Swindon, it ran as a 2-4-0 tender locomotive. Named after the tree, the laurel.
- Lily (1864–1872)
  Built at Swindon, it ran as a 2-4-0 tender locomotive. After withdrawal the boiler was sold to the Telegraph Construction Company who used it as a stationary boiler on board the SS Great Eastern. Named after the lily family of flowers.
- Locust (1862–1876)
  Built by the Vulcan Foundry. Named after the insect, the locust.
- Mogul (1862–1872)
  Built by Kitson & Co, it was later altered to a 2-4-0 tender locomotive. A mogul was the leader of the Mughals.
- Mosquito (1862–1877)
  Built by the Vulcan Foundry. Named after the insect, the mosquito.
- Myrtle (1864–1873)
  Built at Swindon, it ran as a 2-4-0 tender locomotive. Named after the myrtle genus of flowering plants.
- Rose (1863–1877)
  Built at Swindon. Named after the flowering shrub, the rose, the symbol of England.
- Shah (1862–1872)
  Built by Kitson & Co. The shah was the ruler of Persia.
- Shamrock (1863–1877)
  Built at Swindon. Named after the flowering plant, the shamrock, the symbol of Ireland.
- Thistle (1863–1874)
  Built at Swindon. Named after the thistle family of flowering plants, the symbol of Scotland.
- Violet (1864–1872)
  Built at Swindon. Named after the flower, the violet.
- Wasp (1862–1875)
  Built by the Vulcan Foundry. Named after the insect, the wasp.
