= GWR Sharp, Roberts locomotives =

GWR Lion, Atlas and Eagle
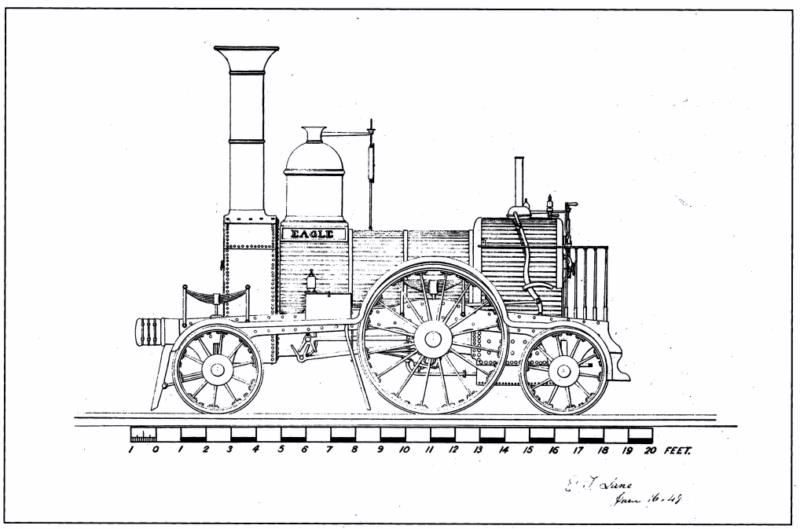
Type and origin
- Power type: Steam
- Builder: Sharp, Roberts & Co.
- Serial number: R, S, and T
- Build date: 1838
- Total produced: 3
- Rebuild date: 1844
- Number rebuilt: 2 (Atlas and Eagle)
Specifications
- Configuration
  - Whyte: 2-2-2; 2-2-2T (after rebuild)
- Gauge: 7 ft 1/4 in (2,140 mm)
- Leading dia.: 3 ft 6 in (1,067 mm)
- Driver dia.: 6 ft 0 in (1,829 mm)
- Trailing dia.: 3 ft 6 in (1,067 mm)
- Wheelbase: 13 ft 10 in (4.22 m)
- Cylinder size: 14 in × 15 in (356 mm × 381 mm); 14-by-18-inch (356 mm × 457 mm) or 15-by-18-inch (381 mm × 457 mm) (after rebuild)
Career
- Operators: Great Western Railway
- Number in class: 3
- Withdrawn: 1847-1872
- Disposition: Unknown, probably scrapped

The first 19 locomotives ordered by Isambard Kingdom Brunel for the Great Western Railway included three 2-2-2 Sharp, Roberts locomotives. They were built by Sharp, Roberts and Company and the most successful of the early designs, two lasting until the 1870s.

The original 14-by-15-inch (356 mm × 381 mm) cylinders were replaced from 1844 by larger 14-by-18-inch (356 mm × 457 mm) or 15-by-18-inch (381 mm × 457 mm) ones.

== Locomotives ==
- Lion (Sharp, Roberts R; 1838–1847)
- Atlas (Sharp, Roberts S; 1838–1872)
  This locomotive was rebuilt as a 2-2-2T tank locomotive in 1860. After it was withdrawn it was sold to a Mr Glasbrook in Swansea.
- Eagle (Sharp, Roberts T; 1838–1871)
  This locomotive was rebuilt as a 2-2-2T tank locomotive in 1860.
