= GWR Leo Class =

Class of 18 British broad-gauge 2-4-0 locomotives

GWR Leo class
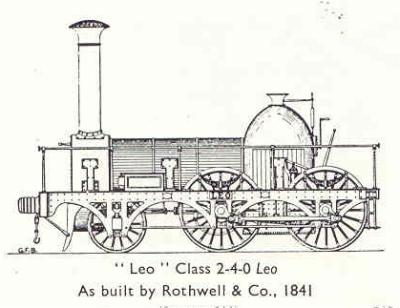
Type and origin
- Power type: Steam
- Designer: Daniel Gooch
- Builder: Rothwell & Co. (12); R and W Hawthorn (3); Fenton, Murray & Jackson (3)
- Total produced: 18
Specifications
- Configuration
  - Whyte: 2-4-0
  - UIC: 1B n2
- Gauge: 7 ft 1/4 in (2,140 mm)
- Leading dia.: 3 ft 6 in (1.067 m)
- Driver dia.: 5 ft 0 in (1.524 m)
- Wheelbase: Loco: 12 ft 9 in (3.886 m)
- Firebox
  - Grate area: 11.5 sq ft (1.07 m^{2})
- Boiler: 50 lbf/in^{2} (340 kPa)
- Heating surface
  - Firebox: 71 sq ft (6.6 m^{2})
  - Tubes: 396 sq ft (36.8 m^{2})
- Cylinder size: 15 in × 18 in (381 mm × 457 mm)
Performance figures
- Tractive effort: 2,868 lbf (12.76 kN)
Career
- Operators: Great Western Railway
- Withdrawn: 1864 - 1874
- Disposition: All scrapped

The Great Western Railway Leo Class 2-4-0 was a class of broad gauge steam locomotives for goods train work. This class was introduced into service between January 1841 and July 1842, and withdrawn between September 1864 and June 1874.

These locomotives were the first for the railway with coupled wheels as they were designed as goods locomotives, but they later found use on passenger trains too. All the class were altered to 2-4-0STs.

The locomotives were built by three different workshops, each with its own naming convention. The first three came from R and W Hawthorn, who named them after strong animals. The next three were named after volcanoes by Fenton, Murray and Jackson, while the final twelve came from Rothwell and Company carrying the names of the twelve houses of the zodiac.

== Locomotives ==
Name	Manufacturer	Serial Nº	Built	Withdrawn	Notes
Elephant	R. & W. Hawthorn & Co.	319	January 1841	December 1870	
Buffalo	R. & W. Hawthorn & Co.	320	March 1841	April 1865	
Dromedary	R. & W. Hawthorn & Co.	321	March 1841	December 1866	
Hecla	Fenton, Murray and Jackson	35	April 1841	September 1864	(Note: Hecla: On 24 December 1841 it was involved in a fatal accident in Sonning Cutting near Reading. It was hauling a so-called "baggage train" consisting of both passenger and goods trucks, when it ran into an earth slip in the cutting, killing eight passengers. At the coroner's inquest on the passengers killed the jury returned a verdict of accidental death in all cases and a deodand of one thousand pounds on the engine, tender and carriages. The deodand was later overturned.)
Stromboli	Fenton, Murray and Jackson	36	April 1841	July 1870	
Etna	Fenton, Murray and Jackson	37	June 1841	December 1870	
Aries	Rothwell and Company	66	June 1841	June 1871	
Taurus	Rothwell and Company	67	July 1841	December 1870	(Note: Taurus: worked the first South Devon Railway train from Newton to Torquay on 18 December 1848.)
Gemini	Rothwell and Company	68	September 1841	March 1866	
Cancer	Rothwell and Company	69	October 1841	June 1874	
Leo	Rothwell and Company	70	October 1841	December 1870	
Virgo	Rothwell and Company	71	December 1841	December 1870	
Libra	Rothwell and Company	72	February 1842	June 1871	
Scorpio	Rothwell and Company	73	February 1842	December 1872	
Sagittarius	Rothwell and Company	74	April 1842	June 1871	(Note: Sagittarius: worked the first train to Warminster on 9 September 1851.)
Capricornus	Rothwell and Company	75	April 1842	July 1870	(Note: Capricorn: Along with Pisces, worked the first train from Totnes to Laira, the temporary terminus of the South Devon Railway at Plymouth on 5 May 1848.)
Aquarius	Rothwell and Company	76	June 1842	July 1870	
Pisces	Rothwell and Company	77	July 1842	June 1874	(Note: Pisces: Along with Capricornus, worked the first train from Totnes to Laira, the temporary terminus of the South Devon Railway at Plymouth on 5 May 1848.)
