= GWR Waverley Class =

Class of British steam locomotives

Great Western Railway Waverley Class
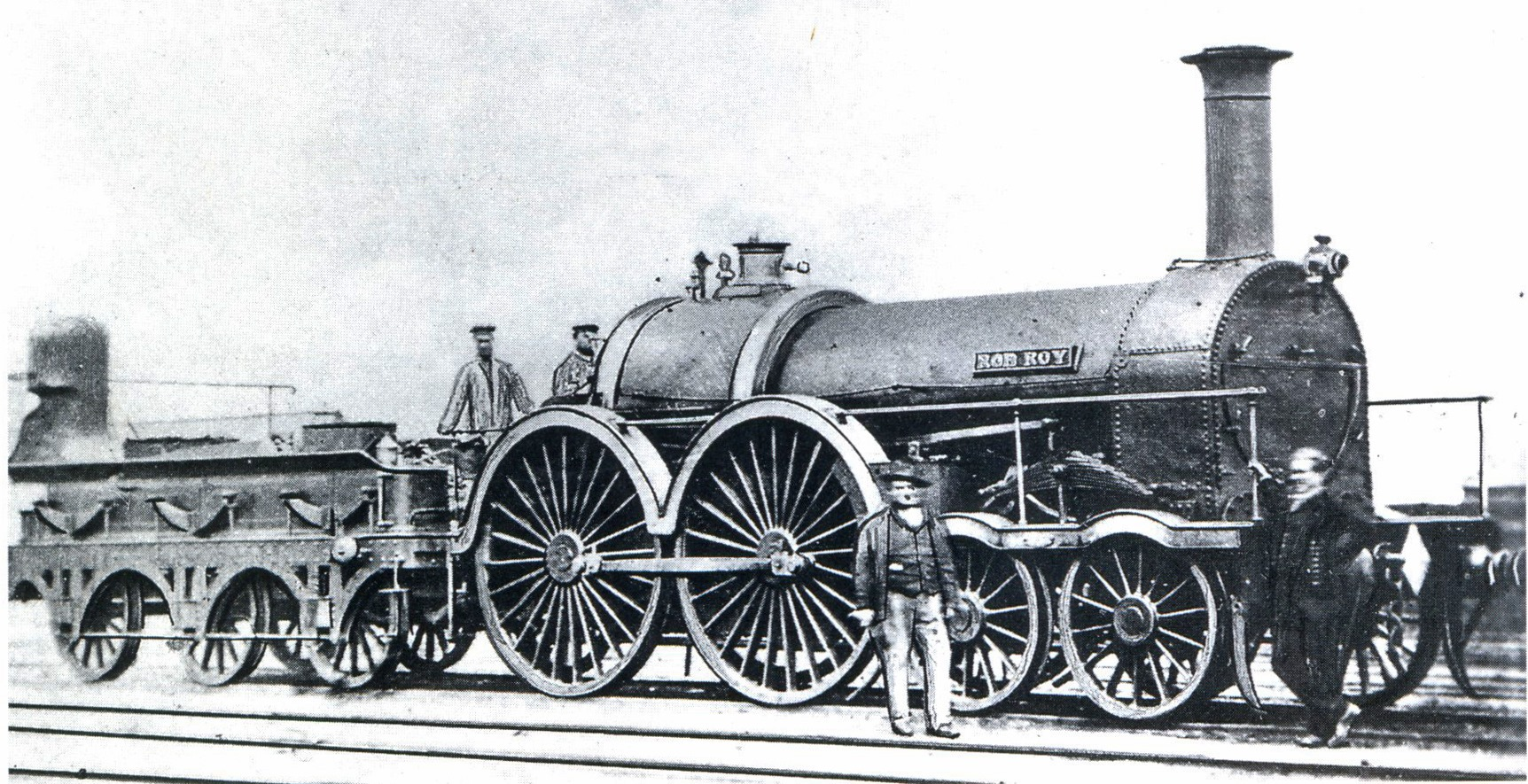
Type and origin
- Power type: Steam
- Designer: Daniel Gooch
- Builder: Robert Stephenson & Co.
Specifications
- Configuration
  - Whyte: 4-4-0
- Gauge: 7 ft 1/4 in (2,140 mm)
- Leading dia.: 4 ft 3 in (1,295 mm)
- Driver dia.: 7 ft 0 in (2,134 mm)
- Wheelbase: 16 ft 0 1/4 in (4,883 mm)
- Cylinder size: 17 in × 24 in (432 mm × 610 mm), dia × stroke
Career
- Operators: Great Western Railway
- Class: Waverley

The Great Western Railway Waverley Class were 4-4-0 broad gauge steam locomotives for express passenger train work.

The class was introduced into service between February and June 1855, and withdrawn between February 1872 and November 1876. From about 1865, the Waverley Class was known as the Abbot Class.

The names are mostly inspired by the Waverley novels of Sir Walter Scott.

== Locomotives ==
- Abbott (1855–1876)
  The Abbot is one of the Waverley novels by Sir Walter Scott.
- Antiquary (1855–1876)
  The Antiquary is one of the Waverley novels.
- Coeur de Lion
  Coeur de Lion is the nickname of King Richard I of England, who appears in The Talisman, a Waverley novel.
- Ivanhoe (1855–1876)
  Ivanhoe is one of the Waverley novels.
- Lalla Rookh (1855–1872)
  Lalla-Rookh was a poem by Thomas Moore.
- Pirate (1855–1876)
  The Pirate is one of the Waverley novels.
- Red Gauntlet (1855–1876)
  Redgauntlet is one of the Waverley novels.
- Rob Roy (1855–1872)
  Rob Roy is the title of one of the Waverley novels and the nickname of Robert Roy MacGregor.
- Robin Hood (1855–1876)
  Robin Hood was an English folk hero.
- Waverley (1855–1876)
  Waverley is the first title in the Waverley series of novels.
