= GWR Charles Tayleur locomotives =

Early British broad gauge locomotives

The first 19 locomotives ordered by Isambard Kingdom Brunel for the Great Western Railway included six 2-2-2 Charles Tayleur locomotives. They were built by Charles Tayleur and Company, which became later the Vulcan Foundry. The locomotives were unsuccessful and rapidly supplemented by the Star Class locomotives ordered by Daniel Gooch once he had been appointed as the Locomotive Engineer. As built, they comprised two groups of three: the first group, delivered in 1837, had cylinders having a bore of 14 inches (360 mm) and the second group, delivered in 1838, had cylinders having a bore of 12 inches (300 mm); all had a stroke of 16 inches (410 mm).

== 14-inch cylinder locomotives ==
GWR Vulcan, Æolus and Bacchus
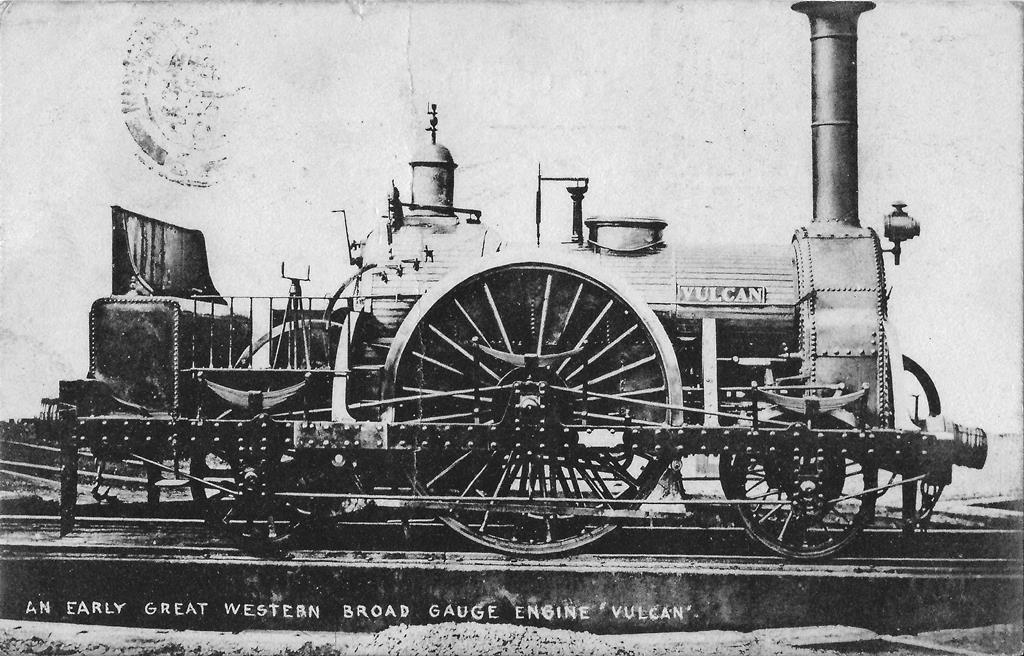
- Vulcan after rebuilding
Type and origin
- Power type: Steam
- Designer: Charles Tayleur
- Builder: Vulcan Foundry
- Serial number: 51–53
- Build date: 1837
- Total produced: 3
- Rebuild date: 1843
- Number rebuilt: 2 (Vulcan and Æolus)
Specifications
- Configuration
  - Whyte: 2-2-2; 2-2-2T (after rebuild)
- Gauge: 7 ft 1/4 in (2,140 mm)
- Leading dia.: 4 ft 6 in (1.372 m); 3 ft 0 in (0.914 m) (Æolus after rebuild)
- Driver dia.: 8 ft 0 in (2.438 m); 6 ft 0 in (1.829 m) (Æolus after rebuild)
- Trailing dia.: 4 ft 6 in (1.372 m); 3 ft 0 in (0.914 m) (Æolus after rebuild)
- Wheelbase: 13 ft 1 in (3.99 m)
- Cylinder size: 14 in × 16 in (356 mm × 406 mm); 15 in × 18 in (381 mm × 457 mm) (Æolus after rebuild)
Career
- Operators: Great Western Railway
- Number in class: 3
- Withdrawn: 1842-1868
- Disposition: Unknown, probably scrapped

- Vulcan (Tayleur 51; 1837–1868)
  This locomotive was the first to run on the Great Western Railway when it was tested on 28 December 1837 from its shed at West Drayton. It was withdrawn in 1843 but was rebuilt as a 2-2-2T tank locomotive and returned to service in 1846, running in this form until 1868. It survived for two more years at Reading as a stationary boiler. It is named after the workshops where it was built, which themselves were named after the Roman god of fire.
- Æolus (Tayleur 52; 1837–1867)
  This locomotive worked the first train on the Great Western Railway when it opened on 4 June 1838. In 1843 it was fitted with more conventional 6-foot-0-inch (1.829 m) driving and 3-foot-0-inch (0.914 m) carrying wheels with 15-by-18-inch (381 mm × 457 mm) cylinders; at some time it was converted to a 2-2-2T tank locomotive. Named for Aeolus, Greek ruler of the winds.
- Bacchus (Tayleur 53; 1837–1842)
  The name was later carried by a Pyracmon Class goods locomotive. Named for Bacchus, Roman god of wine-making.

== 12-inch cylinder locomotives ==
GWR Apollo, Neptune and Venus
Type and origin
- Power type: Steam
- Designer: Charles Tayleur
- Builder: Vulcan Foundry
- Serial number: 62–64
- Build date: 1838
- Total produced: 3
Specifications
- Configuration
  - Whyte: 2-2-2; 2-2-2T (after rebuild)
- Gauge: 7 ft 1/4 in (2,140 mm)
- Leading dia.: 4 ft 6 in (1.372 m); 3 ft 0 in (0.914 m) (Venus after rebuild)
- Driver dia.: 8 ft 0 in (2.438 m); 6 ft 0 in (1.829 m) (Venus after rebuild)
- Trailing dia.: 4 ft 6 in (1.372 m); 3 ft 0 in (0.914 m) (Venus after rebuild)
- Wheelbase: 13 ft 1 in (3.99 m)
- Cylinder size: 12 in × 16 in (305 mm × 406 mm); 15 in × 18 in (381 mm × 457 mm) (Venus after rebuild)
Career
- Operators: Great Western Railway
- Number in class: 3
- Withdrawn: 1840-1870
- Disposition: Unknown, probably scrapped

- Apollo (Tayleur 62; 1838–1867)
  This locomotive was rebuilt in 1839 with new cylinders 15 by 18 inches (381 mm × 457 mm) and was altered to become a 2-2-2T before it ceased work in 1867. Named for Apollo, Greek and Roman god of the sun.
- Neptune (Tayleur 63; 1838–1840)
  The name was later carried by one of the Ariadne Class standard goods locomotives. Named for Neptune, Roman god of the sea.
- Venus (Tayleur 64; 1838–1870)
  This locomotive was withdrawn in 1843 but was rebuilt and returned to service in 1846. It now had 6-foot-0-inch (1.829 m) driving and 3-foot-0-inch (0.914 m) carrying wheels, with 15-by-18-inch (381 mm × 457 mm) cylinders; at some time it was also converted to run as a 2-2-2T tank locomotive. Named for Venus, Roman goddess of love and fertility. The name was also carried by a Firefly Class locomotive from 1841.
