= GWR Pyracmon Class =

Class of 6 British broad-gauge 0-6-0 locomotives

Pyracmon
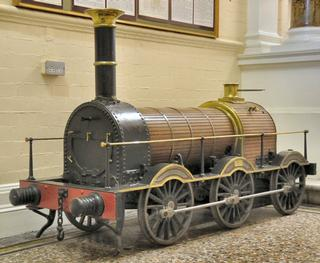
Type and origin
- Power type: Steam
- Designer: Daniel Gooch
- Builder: Great Western Railway
Specifications
- Configuration
  - Whyte: 0-6-0
- Gauge: 7 ft 1/4 in (2,140 mm)
- Driver dia.: 5 ft 0 in (1,524 mm)
- Wheelbase: 15 ft 5 in (4,699 mm)
- Cylinder size: 16 in × 24 in (406 mm × 610 mm), dia × stroke
Career
- Operators: Great Western Railway
- Class: Pyracmon
- Withdrawn: 1869-1873

The Great Western Railway Pyracmon Class were 0-6-0 broad gauge steam locomotives for goods train work. This class was introduced into service between November 1847 and April 1848, and withdrawn between August 1871 and December 1873. Bacchus was added to the class in May 1849 (and withdrawn in November 1869), having been constructed to broadly the same design from spare parts.

The Pyracmon class were a development of the preceding Premier class, the first locomotives to be constructed at the new Swindon railway works. They differed in having the Premiers haycock firebox replaced by Gooch's stronger round-topped firebox with its wrapper raised above the boiler barrel.

From about 1865, Bacchus became part of the Fury Class, while the remaining locomotives became part of the Caesar Class.

== Locomotives ==
- Alligator (1848 - 1873)
  An alligator is a large kind of reptile.
- Bacchus (1848 - 1873)
  This locomotive was built using the boiler from the unsuccessful Hurricane. Bacchus was the Roman god of the harvest, a name that had been carried by one of the Charles Tayleur locomotives built in 1837.
- Behemoth (1848 - 1873)
  This locomotive was sold to the engineers constructing the Severn Tunnel. The Behemoth is a monster in the Book of Job in the Bible.
- Caliban (February 1848 - April 1873)
  Caliban was a 'creature' from Shakespeare's The Tempest.
- Mammoth (1848 - 1873)
  A mammoth is an extinct form of elephant.
- Pyracmon (1847 - 1872)
  Pyracmon is one of the Greek mythological figures known as the Cyclopes.
- Steropes (1848 - 1871)
  Steropes is also one of the Greek mythological figures known as the Cyclopes.
