= GWR 3031 Class =

Type of British steam locomotive

Achilles Class
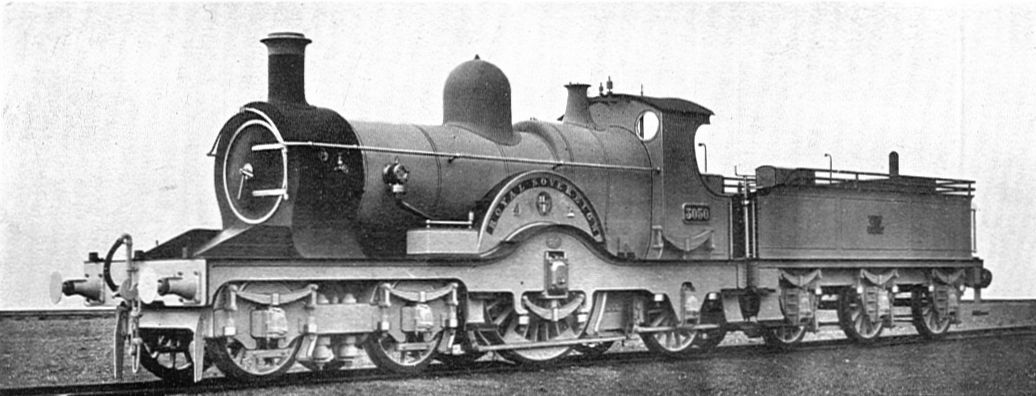
- 3050 Royal Sovereign c. 1895–1907
Type and origin
- Power type: Steam
- Designer: William Dean
- Builder: GWR Swindon Works
- Order number: Lots 94, 95, 110
- Serial number: 1391–1420, 1612–1631
- Build date: 1894–1899
- Total produced: 50 (new)
- Number rebuilt: 30 (from 3001 class)
Specifications
- Configuration
  - Whyte: 4-2-2
  - UIC: 2A1 n2
- Gauge: 4 ft 8 1/2 in (1,435 mm) standard gauge
- Leading dia.: 4 ft 1 1/2 in (1.257 m)
- Driver dia.: 7 ft 8 1/2 in (2.350 m)
- Trailing dia.: 4 ft 7 1/2 in (1.410 m)
- Wheelbase: 18 ft 8 1/2 in (5.702 m)
- Cylinder size: 19 in × 24 in (483 mm × 610 mm)
Career
- Operators: Great Western Railway
- Withdrawn: 1908-1916
- Disposition: All original locomotives scrapped, one non-working replica was built in the early 1980s

The Dean Single, 3031 Class, or Achilles Class is a type of steam locomotive built by the British Great Western Railway between 1891 and 1899. They were designed by William Dean for passenger work. The first 30 members of the class were built as 2-2-2s of the 3001 Class.

The first eight members of the class (numbers 3021-3028, built April–August 1891) were built as convertible 7 ft 1/4 in (2,140 mm) broad gauge 2-2-2 locomotives, being converted to standard gauge in mid-1892, at the end of broad gauge running on the Great Western Railway. A further 22 were built in late 1891 and early 1892, this time as standard gauge engines.

Although the 4 ft 8 1/2 in (1,435 mm) 3001 class were fitted with larger boilers than earlier GWR 2-2-2 classes, the diameter of the boiler was constrained by its position between the 7 ft 8 1/2 in (2.350 m) driving wheels. Thus boiler capacity could only be increased by making the boiler longer, not wider, bringing the smokebox and cylinders in front of the leading axle. The extra weight of the larger boilers was borne by the leading wheels, making the locomotives unstable, particularly at speed. On 16 September 1893 No. 3021 Wigmore Castle, hauling an express train, was derailed in Box Tunnel when the front axle broke. The cause of the accident was thought to be excessive weight being carried on the front axle, so it was decided to replace the leading pair of wheels in the 3001 class with a bogie.

In the 3001 class the steam chest was located underneath the cylinders, and contained two slide valves. The inverted placement of the valves allowed them to drop away from the face of the steam ports when steam was shut off, thus reducing wear. The steam chest and valves lay above the front carrying axle, and there was sufficient clearance to allow the steam chest cover to be removed over the axle for maintenance.

Replacing the axle with a bogie of conventional design would have obstructed access to the port faces. Dean instead used a suspension bogie, in which the weight of the locomotive was transferred upwards to the bogie by four bolts mounted on the inside frames. The centre pin of the bogie rotated in a spring-centred block mounted beneath the steam chest on cross beams. This setup gave sufficient clearance so that, when the bolts were undone, the front end of the locomotive raised, and the bogie was run out from underneath, the steam chest cover could be removed without hindrance.

No. 3021 was rebuilt as a 4-2-2 in March 1894. Between June and December 1894 the 28 remaining locomotives of the 3001 class were rebuilt. The first of a further 50 new bogie singles was also built in March 1894, the last of the class being outshopped in March 1899. These new locomotives differed from the rebuilds in having their cylinder diameter reduced from 20 to 19 inches (508 to 483 mm), and the springs for the trailing wheels located above the footplate and outside the cab, necessitating a reduced width for the latter. The rebuilds subsequently had their cylinders lined down to 19 inches (483 mm). The entire class, as they required it, had their driving wheels fitted with thicker tyres from 1898 onwards, increasing the wheel diameter by one-half inch (12.7 mm) to 7 ft 8 1/2 in (2.350 m).

In 1900, George Jackson Churchward replaced the boiler on number 3027 Worcester with a parallel Standard 2 boiler. Twelve further engines were similarly converted in 1905 and 1906.

Despite the locomotives' speed, the 4-2-2 design was soon found to be outdated and unsuitable for more modern operation. A proposal to improve their performance by fitting them with long-travel valves was found to be impracticable; the existing valves were directly driven from eccentrics mounted on the driving axle, and there was insufficient clearance to fit larger eccentrics. Churchward considered rebuilding the class as Armstrong Class 4-4-0s with 7 ft 2 in (2.184 m) coupled wheels. The cylinder centre line would then be 3.5 in (89 mm) above the driving centre, due to the 7 in (178 mm) difference in driving wheel diameter. This scheme was not carried through because the connecting rods would not clear the lower slide bar, and the valve gear would be out of alignment. An alternative proposal to drop the locomotive 3.5 in (89 mm), and raise the buffer beam and dragbox, was also rejected on the grounds of cost. The class were gradually withdrawn between 1908 and 1915, with the last survivor, no. 3074 Princess Helena, being withdrawn in December 1916. All of the originals were scrapped, but a non-working replica was built in the early 1980s.

== Notable members of the class ==
3065 Duke of Connaught made a record-breaking run with the Ocean Mail on 9 May 1904 (having taken over the train from City of Truro at Bristol), covering the distance from Bristol (Pylle Hill) to Paddington in 99 minutes 46 seconds as part of a run from Plymouth to Paddington in 227 minutes.

3041 The Queen, originally named James Mason, was an example of this class allocated to Royal Train duties.

Number 3046 Lord of the Isles has enjoyed a certain amount of celebrity, having been chosen as the prototype for a Tri-ang model locomotive. Since then the engine has also been modelled by Brio and Matchbox. In 2006, Hornby also produced a limited edition of the same model, this time bearing the name Lorna Doone. Hornby also produced Royal Sovereign, Great Western, Duke of Edinburgh and Achilles in 2008, 2010, 2009 and 2020 respectively.

== Replica ==
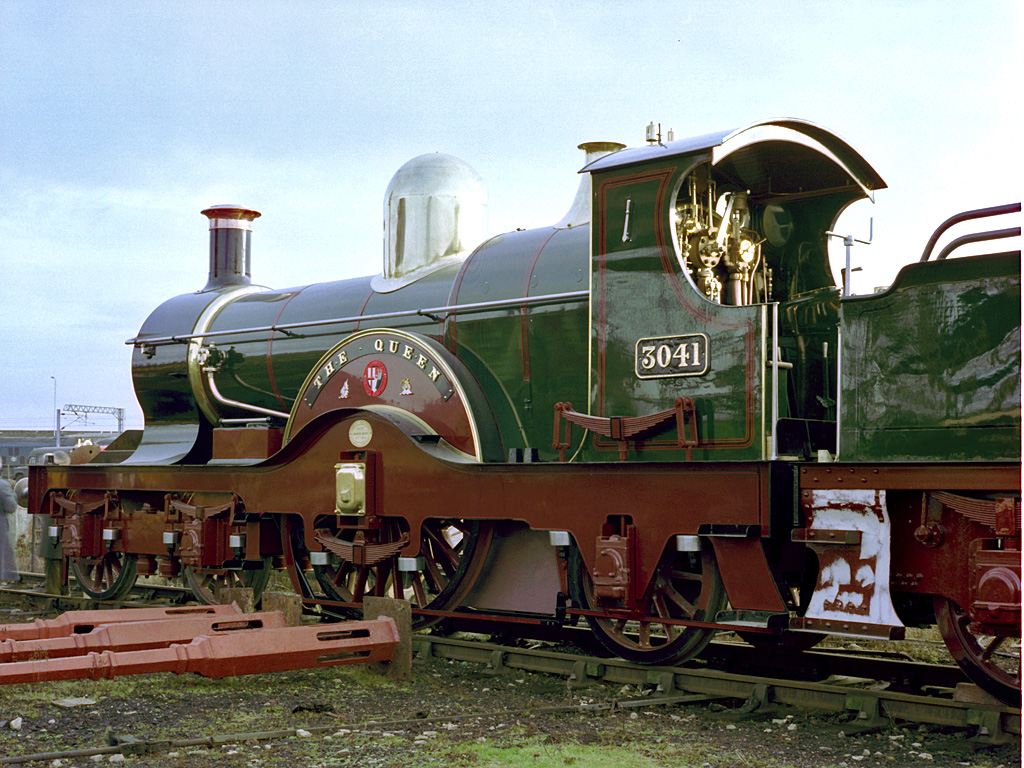
The replica No. 3041 in 1982

None of the original class survive, but a static replica of The Queen was commissioned by Tussauds for the Railways and Royalty exhibition at Windsor and Eton Central railway station. The replica loco was completed in December 1982 and displayed outside Steamtown in January 1983 (where it was constructed), before being transported by road to Windsor on 12 January 1983 and arriving on 14 January.

The main frames, footplate, 'boiler', smokebox, cab and splashers were fabricated by Babcock's of Tipton. The tender was modified from an LBSCR C2x tender. Parts from a GWR tender, that came from the Dumbleton Hall Preservation Society, were used to provide the wheels for the front bogie and the rear wheels. The top halves of the driving wheels do not exist, while the bottom halves were cast from 2 quarters, being bolted together to make a half. The driving wheels also do not sit on the rail so the loco could be wheeled into position on its front bogie and rear wheels. Some boiler fittings were obtained from the Great Western Society and sandblasted, and the dome and safety valve bonnet were made by Newcastle Metal Spinners. Tussaud's fitted smoke and steam generators, so steam was emitted from the cab, whistles, safety valves and smoke from the chimney. A sound unit was also fitted.

The engine remains there, but the tender was scrapped to make more space for the shopping centre occupying that station building. The Bluebell Railway Atlantic Group purchased the axleboxes, springs and the complete wheel sets from the tender for use in their newbuild Atlantic project.

== Numbering ==
Number	Name	Built	4-2-2 rebuild	Withdrawn	Details and information
3001	Amazon	01/1892	10/1894	06/1908	Previously the name of a Rover Class locomotive withdrawn in 1892; named after a nation of female warriors in Greek mythology.
3002	Atalanta	01/1892	06/1894	09/1908	Named after a character in Greek mythology
3003	Avalanche	02/1892	05/1894	06/1909	Previously the name of a Banking Class locomotive withdrawn in 1865
3004	Black Prince	02/1892	11/1894	10/1911	Named after the eldest son of Edward III
3005	Britannia	02/1892	11/1894	02/1908	The Roman name for Britain
3006	Courier	03/1892	06/1894	02/1914	Previously the name of a Rover Class locomotive withdrawn in 1892
3007	Dragon	03/1892	08/1894	03/1912	Previously the name of a Rover Class locomotive withdrawn in 1892
3008	Emperor	03/1892	10/1894	08/1912	Previously the name of a Rover Class locomotive withdrawn in 1892
3009	Flying Dutchman	03/1892	11/1894	08/1912	Named after the winner of the Epsom Derby in 1849
3010	Fire King	03/1892	09/1894	09/1908	Previously the name of a Banking Class locomotive withdrawn in 1875
3011	Greyhound	03/1892	01/1894	09/1911	Named after the breed of racing dog
3012	Great Western	03/1892	06/1894	05/1909	Previously the name of a Rover Class locomotive withdrawn in 1892
3013	Great Britain	03/1892	11/1894	02/1914	Previously the name of a Rover Class locomotive withdrawn in 1892
3014	Iron Duke	04/1892	10/1894	06/1908	Previously the name of the Iron Duke Class and a locomotive of that class; in this case it was reused from a locomotive of the Rover Class withdrawn in 1892. One of two locomotives of the class named after the Duke of Wellington.
3015	Kennet	04/1892	08/1894	06/1908	Named after the River Kennet. The locomotive was involved in the Slough rail accident of 1900.
3016	Lightning	04/1892	11/1894	03/1911	Previously the name of a Rover Class locomotive withdrawn in 1892
3017	Prometheus	04/1892	09/1894	09/1908	Originally named Nelson, for Horatio Nelson; renamed May 1895; previously the name of a Rover Class locomotive withdrawn in 1892. Prometheus is a Titan in Greek mythology.
3018	Glenside	04/1892	08/1894	06/1913	Built as Racer (a term for fast trains from the mid-19th century); renamed September 1911
3019	Rover	04/1892	05/1894	09/1908	Previously the name of the Rover class of locomotives, and of an Iron Duke Class locomotive withdrawn in 1871
3020	Sultan	04/1892	09/1894	02/1908	Previously the name of a Rover Class locomotive withdrawn in 1892
3021	Wigmore Castle	04/1892	03/1894	05/1909	Built to broad gauge. Involved in an accident in Box Tunnel in 1893. Named after a ruined castle in Herefordshire
3022	Bessemer	05/1892	07/1894	02/1909	Built to broad gauge and originally named Rougemont (previously the name of an Iron Duke Class locomotive withdrawn in 1879). Renamed in 1898, after Henry Bessemer, who invented the first process for mass-producing steel.
3023	Swallow	07/1891	09/1894	09/1912	Built to broad gauge; previously the name of an Iron Duke Class locomotive withdrawn in 1871
3024	Storm King	07/1891	12/1894	02/1909	Built to broad gauge.
3025	Quicksilver	08/1891	10/1894	09/1908	Built to broad gauge and named St. George. Renamed May 1907, after the element mercury; previously the name of a Saint Class locomotive, which was itself renamed The Abbott 03/1907.
3026	Tornado	08/1891	06/1894	02/1909	Built to broad gauge; previously the name of a Rover Class locomotive withdrawn in 1892.
3027	Worcester	08/1891	11/1894	07/1914	Built to broad gauge and originally named Thames; renamed December 1895.
3028	Wellington	08/1891	07/1894	02/1909	Built to broad gauge. Previously the name of an Ariadne Class locomotive withdrawn in 1873. One of two locomotives in the class named after Arthur Wellesley, 1st Duke of Wellington.
3029	White Horse	11/1891	07/1894	05/1909	During the first half of the 19th Century the West Country saw several hill figures carved by garrisoned troops, often in the form of a white horse; these were inspired by the original Uffington White Horse in the Vale of the White Horse, in Berkshire (Oxfordshire since 1974).
3030	Westward Ho	12/1891	10/1894	05/1909	Named after a brand of tobacco produced by W.D. & H.O. Wills. The workers on the gauge conversion in 1892 were issued with 2 ounces (57 g) each.
3031	Achilles	03/1894		07/1912	Namesake of its class of locomotives; previously the name of a Firefly Class locomotive withdrawn in 1867.
3032	Agamemnon	07/1894		10/1913	Agamemnon was a character in Greek mythology; HMS Agamemnon served in both the American Revolutionary War and Napoleonic Wars, and was Nelson's favourite battleship.
3033	Albatross	07/1894		07/1911	
3034	Behemoth	07/1894		10/1908	Previously the name of a Pyracmon Class locomotive withdrawn in 1873
3035	Beaufort	07/1894		05/1909	Originally named Bellerophon (previously the name of a Premier Class locomotive withdrawn in 1870); renamed December 1895.
3036	Crusader	09/1894		03/1911	
3037	Corsair	09/1894		10/1908	Previously the name of a Bogie Class locomotive withdrawn in 1873; named after the North African pirates.
3038	Devonia	09/1894		10/1908	Named for Devon
3039	Dreadnought	09/1894		07/1915	An allusion to the power of a steam locomotive.
3040	Empress of India	09/1894		03/1912	A title of Queen Victoria
3041	James Mason	10/1894		11/1912	Originally Emlyn; renamed The Queen 1897 (previously the name of a Prince Class locomotive, withdrawn 1870); renamed James Mason June 1910.
3042	Frederick Saunders	10/1894		01/1912	
3043	Hercules	01/1895		12/1913	Previously the name of a Hercules Class locomotive withdrawn in 1870
3044	Hurricane	01/1895		10/1908	Named after the horse that won the 1,000 Guineas in 1862
3045	Hirondelle	01/1895		05/1914	Previously the name of a Rover Class locomotive withdrawn in 1891; French for 'swallow'.
3046	Lord of the Isles	01/1895		10/1908	Previously the name of an Iron Duke Class locomotive withdrawn in 1884. Lord of the Isles is a Scottish title of nobility.
3047	Lorna Doone	02/1895		11/1912	A novel by Richard Doddridge Blackmore set in 17th Century Devon, within the GWR region
3048	Majestic	02/1895		06/1913	Named after HMS Majestic, a battleship launched the month prior to the locomotive's delivery
3049	Nelson	02/1895		07/1913	Originally named Prometheus; renamed May 1895. Previously the name of an Ariadne Class locomotive withdrawn in 1873.
3050	Royal Sovereign	02/1895		12/1915	Royal Sovereign was a contemporary term for Queen Victoria. This name was temporarily transferred to Atbara Class locomotive no. 3373 when it hauled the Royal Funeral Train from Paddington on 2 February, 1901.
3051	Stormy Petrel	02/1895		11/1912	Named for the storm-petrel
3052	Sir Walter Raleigh	03/1895		09/1913	Named after the Elizabethan nobleman and explorer who was involved in the English settlement of Virginia, and popularized tobacco smoking in Europe
3053	Sir Francis Drake	03/1895		09/1911	Named after the Elizabethan sea captain, navigator and slave-trader, famous for the defeat of the Spanish Armada and the first Englishman to circumnavigate the globe
3054	Sir Richard Grenville	03/1895		10/1911	Named after the Elizabethan privateer and explorer, involved with Raleigh in the settlement of North America, and with Drake's action against the Spanish Armada
3055	Lambert	03/1895		02/1914	Built as Trafalgar (previously the name of an Ariadne Class locomotive withdrawn in 1871); renamed July 1901. Henry Lambert was a captain of the English navy during the Napoleonic Wars.
3056	Wilkinson	03/1895		10/1914	Built as Timour (previously the name of a Rover Class locomotive withdrawn in 1892); renamed July 1901.
3057	Walter Robinson	04/1895		09/1912	Built as Tartar (previously the name of a Rover Class locomotive withdrawn in 1892); renamed July 1901.
3058	Grierson	04/1895		02/1912	Built as Ulysses (previously the name of an Ariadne Class locomotive withdrawn in 1872); renamed May 1895. James Grierson was chief engineer of the GWR; his son William was also a civil engineer on the railway.
3059	John W. Wilson	04/1895		06/1913	Named after John William Wilson, a Worcestershire Liberal Unionist politician.
3060	John G. Griffiths	04/1895		03/1915	Built as Warlock (previously the name of a Rover Class locomotive withdrawn 1892); renamed 03/1908, after a director of the GWR 1908–22; name removed 03/1914.
3061	George A. Wills	05/1897		12/1912	Built as Alexandra; name removed 11/1910; renamed 10/1911 after George Alfred Wills, a GWR director and chairman of Imperial Tobacco.
3062	Albert Edward	05/1897		04/1915	Named after the first son of Queen Victoria, the Prince of Wales and future King Edward VII
3063	Duke of York	06/1897		01/1912	Named after George Frederick, the grandson of Queen Victoria who would later become King George V.
3064	Duke of Edinburgh	06/1897		09/1911	Named after Alfred, Queen Victoria's second son.
3065	Duke of Connaught	07/1897		10/1914	Named after Arthur, Queen Victoria's third son.
3066	Duchess of Albany	12/1897		10/1913	Named after Helena, the wife of Queen Victoria's youngest son Leopold.
3067	Duchess of Teck	12/1897		12/1914	Named after Queen Victoria's cousin, Princess Mary Adelaide of Cambridge (mother of Mary of Teck, who became Queen Mary as wife of King George V)
3068	Duke of Cambridge	01/1898		11/1912	Named after Queen Victoria's cousin, Prince George, Duke of Cambridge, who was commander-in-chief of the British Army until 1895
3069	Earl of Chester	01/1898		06/1912	A title given to Albert Edward when he became Prince of Wales.
3070	Earl of Warwick	02/1898		10/1914	Named after Francis Greville, a Conservative politician who served in the House of Commons 1879–92 and the House of Lords until his death in 1924.
3071	Emlyn	02/1898		10/1914	Named after the Emlyn area of South Wales, served by the GWR
3072	Bulkeley	06/1898		08/1912	Built as North Star (previously the name of a Star Class locomotive withdrawn 1871); name removed early 1906; renamed 09/1906 (previously the name of a Sir Watkin Class locomotive withdrawn 1872).
3073	Princess Royal	06/1898		10/1912	Title of Queen Victoria's eldest daughter
3074	Princess Helena	06/1898		12/1916	Named after Queen Victoria's third daughter
3075	Princess Louise	07/1898		06/1912	Named after the eldest daughter of Albert Edward and granddaughter of Queen Victoria
3076	Princess Beatrice	02/1899		07/1912	Named after Queen Victoria's fifth daughter
3077	Princess May	02/1899		11/1912	Named after George Frederick's wife Mary of Teck
3078	Eupatoria	02/1899		11/1911	Previously the name of a Rover Class locomotive withdrawn 1892; the Battle of Eupatoria was fought in the Crimean War
3079	Thunderbolt	02/1899		09/1911	
3080	Windsor Castle	03/1899		10/1913	Named after the residence of the Royal Family, in Berkshire

== Models ==
Hornby Railways manufacture a model of the 3031 Class in OO gauge.

A model of the "Duke of Connaught" was produced by Lesney Products as Y-14 in the Models of Yesteryear range from 1959 to 1963.

== Civic heraldry ==
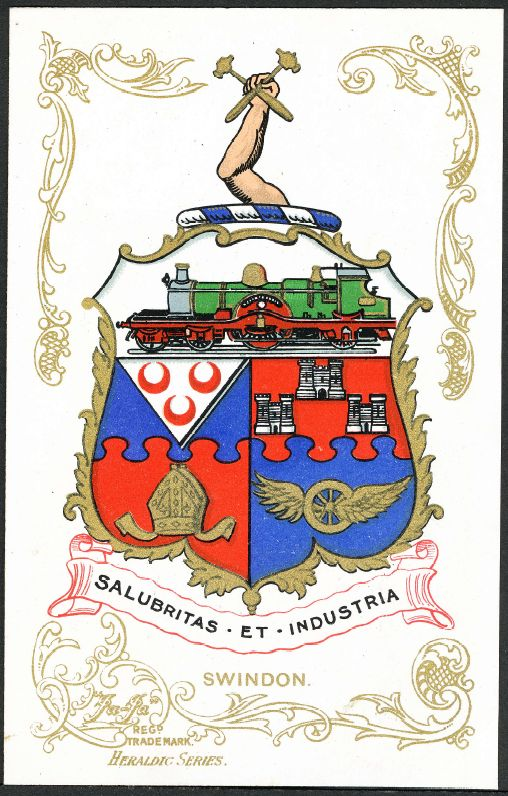
Borough of Swindon arms on 1905 'JaJa' postcard

The coat of arms of the old Borough of Swindon (1900–74) includes an image of 3029 White Horse on the shield. The coat of arms was displayed on the splashers of the last Castle Class built (No. 7037 Swindon). STEAM Museum of the Great Western Railway at Swindon acquired one of the splashers in 2012.
