= Class 69 =

Class 69 may refer to:

- British Rail Class 69, a class of diesel locomotive converted from existing class 56 locomotives
- NSB Class 69, a Norwegian passenger train
- DRG Class 69, a German 2-2-2T passenger locomotive class operated by the Deutsche Reichsbahn following the annexation of Austria prior to World War II and comprising:
  - BBÖ Class 12, locomotives 69 001 - 002
  - KkStB Class 112, locomotive 69 011

== See also ==
- Type 69 (disambiguation)
