= Beuth =

Beuth may refer to:

- Beuth (locomotive)
- Christian Peter Wilhelm Beuth
- Peter Beuth
- Robert Alan Beuth
- Beuth Verlag, a subsidiary of the DIN Group (Deutsches Institut für Normung) in charge of the publication of German standards
