= GWR Iron Duke class =

Steam locomotives built 1846–1847

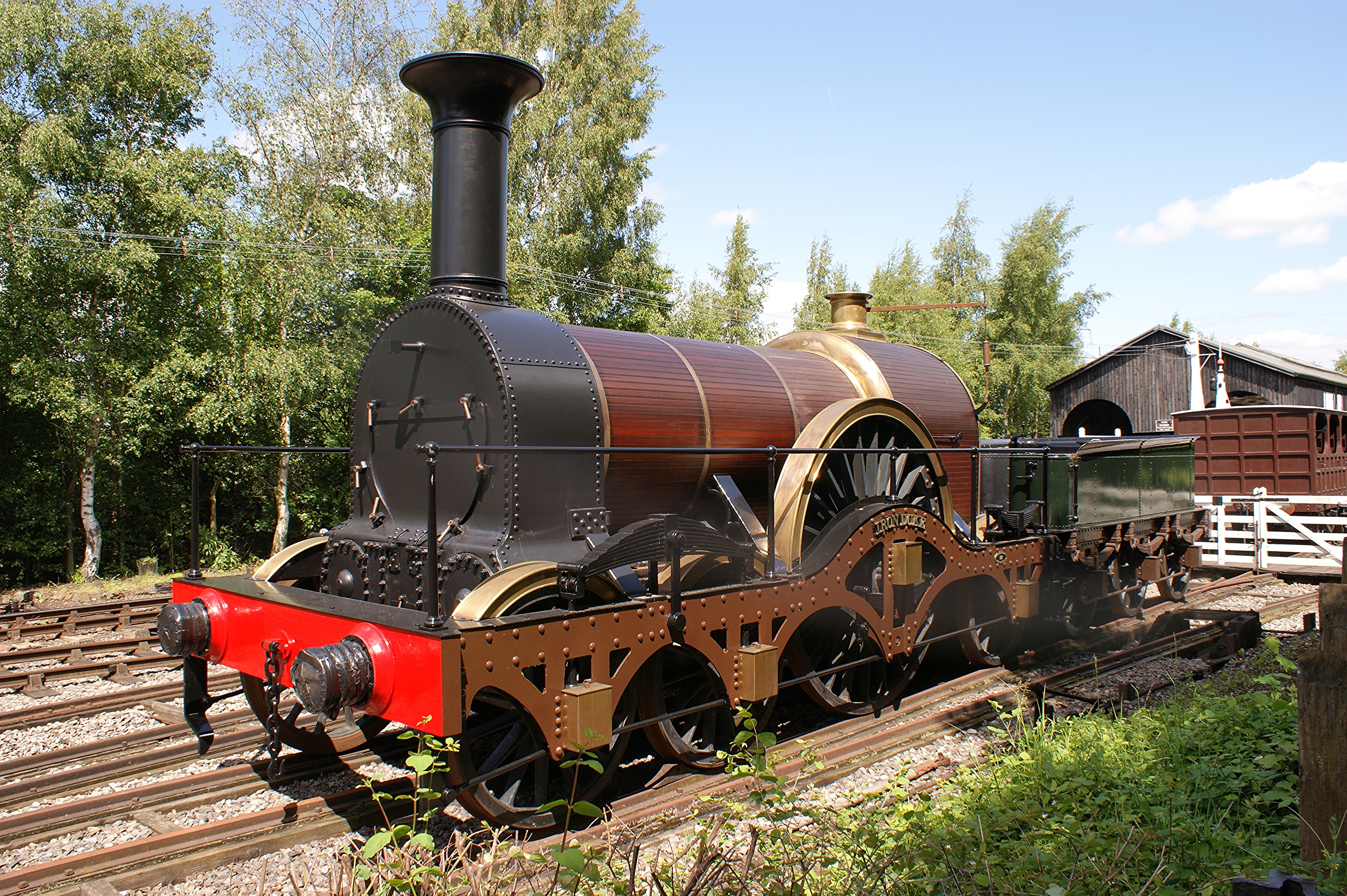
Replica of GWR Broad Gauge (7') Gooch "Alma" or "Iron Duke" Class 4-2-2.

The Great Western Railway Iron Duke Class 4-2-2 was a class of 7 ft 1/4 in (2,140 mm) broad gauge steam locomotives for express passenger train work.

== History ==
The prototype locomotive, Great Western, (Note: The Diaries of Sir Daniel Gooch were first printed in 1892 by Kegan Paul, Trench, Trubner, & Co. Ltd. This edition states that the prototype locomotive was named Great Britain. The 1972 edition of Sir Daniel Gooch: Memoirs and Diary says the locomotive was named Great Western which is in agreement with other books. The 1972 editor further notes that Gooch only started to write his memoirs in 1868 and so early information such as this is reliant on his memories of events 20 years earlier. Daniel Kinnear Clark’s The Steam Engine, published in 1890, identifies the locomotive as Great Britain when considering Gooch's Indicators as a case study.) was built as a 2-2-2 locomotive in April 1846, but was soon converted to a 4-2-2 arrangement, with the leading wheels set rigidly within the sandwich framing, rather than in a separate bogie. The remainder of the class entered service between April 1847 and July.

The Iron Duke locomotives were fast for their time, and were recorded reaching 78.2 mph (125.9 km/h). They were used to haul the Flying Dutchman express train, which was the fastest express train in the world for several decades. In 1852, the daily service from London Paddington to Exeter (194 miles or 312 km) was achieved with an average speed of 53 mph (85 km/h), with the flatter section between London and Swindon covered at an average speed of 59 mph (95 km/h).

From about 1865, the Iron Duke Class was known as the Alma Class.

In May to July 1870, three locomotives (Great Britain, Prometheus and Estaffete) were extensively rebuilt with new frames and boilers, but retaining their original names. Following these, further locomotives were built to similar specifications, entering service between August 1871 and July 1888. These new locomotives are generally referred to as the Rover class. Although these locomotives took the names of withdrawn locomotives of the original design, they were not rebuilt from them like the first three, but entirely new locomotives (though it is believed that Rover, Swallow and Balaklava may have included some parts from the earlier locomotives of those names).

Apart from the three conversions, the original locomotives were withdrawn between December 1870 and June 1884. Lord of the Isles (the last to be withdrawn) was initially preserved by the GWR at Swindon Works, but was scrapped in January 1906 owing to the pressure of space. The three conversions were withdrawn between September 1880 and October 1887, while the other locomotives to the later design were all withdrawn with the end of the GWR 7 ft 1/4 in (2,140 mm) broad gauge in May 1892 (except Hirondelle, which had been withdrawn in December 1890).

Many of the nameplates can be seen at the National Railway Museum and at the Museum of the Great Western Railway, while the driving wheels from Lord of the Isles can also be seen at Swindon.

== Locomotives ==
=== 2-2-2 Great Western ===
Great Western
Type and origin
- Power type: Steam
- Designer: Daniel Gooch
- Builder: GWR Swindon Works
- Build date: April 1846
Specifications
- Configuration
  - Whyte: 2-2-2
  - UIC: 1A1 n2
- Gauge: 7 ft 1/4 in (2,140 mm)
- Leading dia.: 4 ft 6 in (1.372 m)
- Driver dia.: 8 ft 0 in (2.438 m)
- Trailing dia.: 4 ft 6 in (1.372 m)
- Wheelbase: 8 ft 0 in (2.438 m) + 8 ft 0 in (2.438 m)
- Total weight: 41 long tons 14 cwt (93,400 lb or 42.4 t) (93,400 lb or 42,400 kg)
- Boiler pressure: 140 psi (0.97 MPa)
- Cylinders: Two, inside
- Cylinder size: 21 in × 26 in (533 mm × 660 mm) or 18 in × 24 in (457 mm × 610 mm)

The prototype for this class was named the Great Western and built in 1846. Named after the railway, it was designed to show how the 2-2-2 express engines could be improved; its 8-foot-diameter (2.438 m) driving wheels were one foot (305 mm) larger than those of the successful Fire Fly class. It broke its leading axle after a short while in service and was subsequently rebuilt as a 4-2-2, becoming part of the Iron Duke class.

=== Iron Duke class ===
Iron Duke Class
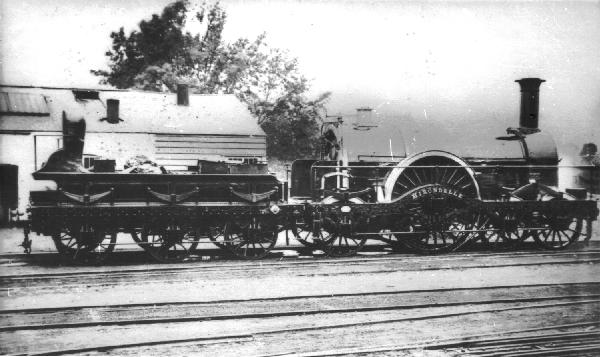
- Hirondelle
Type and origin
- Power type: Steam
- Designer: Daniel Gooch
- Builder: GWR Swindon Works (22); Rothwell and Company (7)
- Order number: Swindon 2nd, 3rd, and 4th Lot Passenger
- Build date: April 1847 – July 1855
Specifications
- Configuration
  - Whyte: 4-2-2
  - UIC: 2A1 n2
- Gauge: 7 ft 1/4 in (2,140 mm)
- Leading dia.: 4 ft 6 in (1.372 m)
- Driver dia.: 8 ft 0 in (2.438 m)
- Trailing dia.: 4 ft 6 in (1.372 m)
- Wheelbase: 2nd Lot Passenger: 4 ft 11 in (1.499 m) + 6 ft 3 in (1.905 m) + 7 ft 4 in (2.235 m); 3rd/4th Lot Passenger: 4 ft 9 1/4 in (1.454 m) + 6 ft 4 1/4 in (1.937 m) + 7 ft 7 in (2.311 m)
- Boiler pressure: 100 lbf/in^{2} (690 kPa), later 115 lbf/in^{2} (790 kPa)
- Cylinder size: 18 in × 24 in (457 mm × 610 mm)

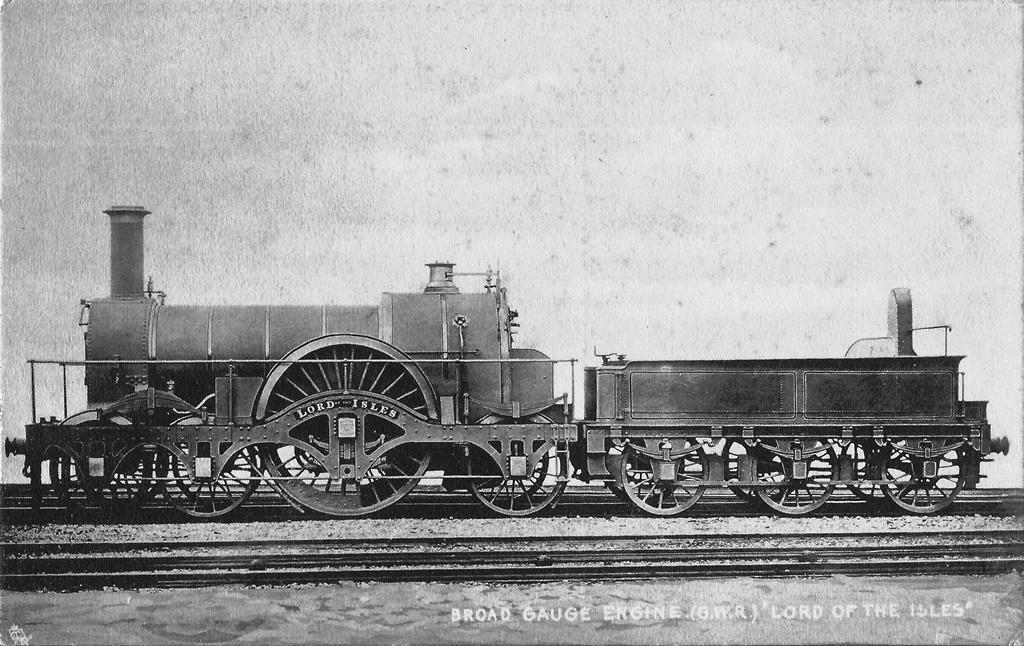
Lord of the Isles

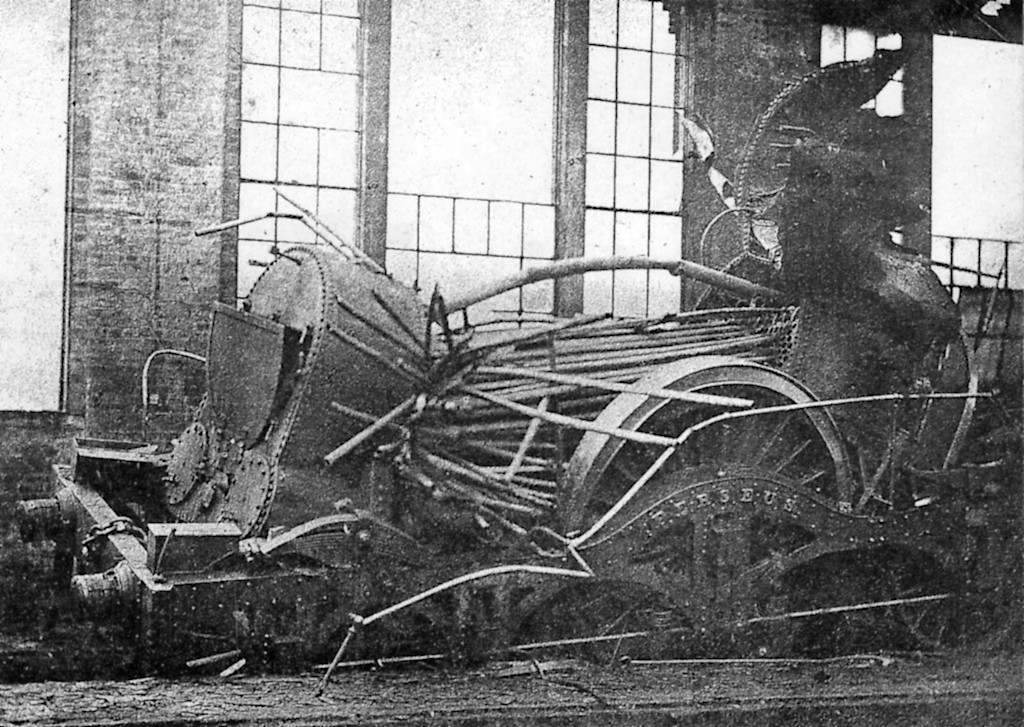
Perseus following the boiler explosion at Westbourne Park, 1862

Name	Built	Withdrawn	Details and information
Great Western	1846	1870	Rebuilt from the 2-2-2 first, prototype, locomotive, with an 18 ft 11 1/2 in (5.779 m) wheelbase. Name of the Great Western Railway company and Brunel's first steam ship, SS Great Western of 1838.
Great Britain	1847	1880	Second production locomotive, one of the first batch built, with an 18 ft 6 in (5.639 m) wheelbase. Name of the country, Great Britain, and Brunel's SS Great Britain steamship of 1843.
Iron Duke	1847	1871	One of the first batch built, with an 18 ft 6 in (5.639 m) wheelbase. Iron Duke was a reference to the Duke of Wellington.
Emperor	1847	1873	One of the first batch built, with an 18 ft 6 in (5.639 m) wheelbase. An emperor is a ruler of an empire.
Lightning	1847	1878	One of the first batch built, with an 18 ft 6 in (5.639 m) wheelbase. Lightning is a fast and powerful discharge of electrostatic energy from clouds.
Pasha	1847	1876	One of the first batch built, with an 18 ft 6 in (5.639 m) wheelbase. A pasha is a Turkish chieftain.
Sultan	1847	1874	One of the first batch built, with an 18 ft 6 in (5.639 m) wheelbase. Involved in an accident at Ealing: it ran into some goods wagons that were being shunted, and six passengers were killed. A sultan is a Muslim ruler.
Courier	1848	1877	A courier is a person who carries packages.
Dragon	1848	1872	A dragon is a mythological type of beast.
Hirondelle	1848	1873	'Hirondelle' is French for a swallow.
Rougemont	1848	1879	Rougemont Castle is a site of historic interest in Exeter, within the GWR region.
Tartar	1848	1876	A Tartar is an eastern European Turkic speakers.
Warlock	1848	1874	A Warlock is a male witch.
Wizard	1848	1875	A wizard is a traditional magician or magus.
Swallow	1849	1871	A swallow is a fast-flying bird.
Timour	1849	1871	Timour, also known as Timur or Tamerlane, was a 14th-century central Asian ruler.
Tornado	1849	1881	A tornado is a powerful wind.
Estaffete	1850	1884	Rebuilt 1870 with a new boiler and its wheelbase increased to 19 ft. 'Estafette' is French for a military courier.
Perseus	1850	1880	Perseus was a character in Greek mythology. Its boiler exploded at the locomotive sheds at Westbourne Park outside Paddington station, 8 November 1862.
Prometheus	1850	1887	Rebuilt in 1870 with a new boiler and its wheelbase increased to 19 ft, it was similar to the Rover class introduced the following year. Prometheus was a character in Greek mythology.
Rover	1850	1871	A rover is a wanderer.
Amazon	1851	1877	The Amazons were a mythical tribe of warrior women.
Lord of the Isles	1851	1884	Before entering service, named Charles Russell in honour of a GWR director; exhibited at the Great Exhibition in London. The following year it hauled the director's inspection train from Paddington station to Birmingham Snow Hill and was involved in a collision at Aynho railway station when it ran into the back of a stopping train and was derailed, several people were seriously injured. It was being driven at the time by Mr Brunel and Mr Gooch. After withdrawal in 1884, the locomotive was stored at Swindon Works until 1906; during this time it was exhibited at Edinburgh in 1890, Chicago in 1893, and Earl's Court, (London) in 1897. When exhibited, it was claimed that between 1851 and July 1881 it was in continual service and completed 789,300 miles on its original boiler. Lord of the Isles was a hereditary title of the Scottish nobility, given to the eldest son of the British monarch.
Alma	1854	1872	Commemorates the Crimean War Battle of Alma (1854).
Balaklava	1854	1871	Commemorates the Crimean War Battle of Balaclava (1854).
Crimea	1855	1876	Commemorates the Crimean War (1853 to 1856).
Eupatoria	1855	1876	Commemorates the Crimean War Battle of Eupatoria (1855).
Inkermann	1855	1877	Commemorates the Crimean War Battle of Inkerman (1854).
Kertch	1855	1872	Commemorates the capture of Kertch during the Crimean War (1855).
Sebastopol	1855	1880	Commemorates the Siege of Sebastopol during the Crimean War (1854–1855).

=== Rover class ===
Rover Class (or Iron Duke Class rebuilt)
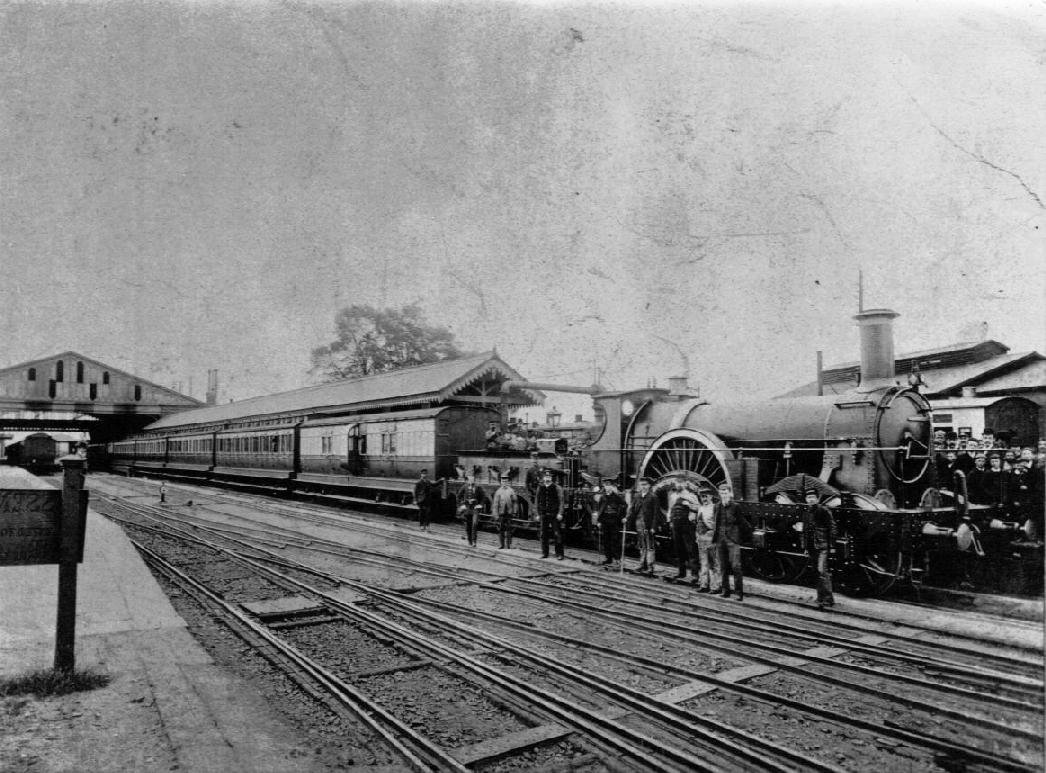
- Dragon at Taunton while working the last broad gauge train from London to Penzance on 20 May 1892
Type and origin
- Power type: Steam
- Designer: Joseph Armstrong
- Builder: Great Western Railway
Specifications
- Configuration
  - Whyte: 4-2-2
  - UIC: 2A1 n2
- Gauge: 7 ft 1/4 in (2,140 mm)
- Leading dia.: 4 ft 6 in (1.372 m)
- Driver dia.: 8 ft 0 in (2.438 m)
- Trailing dia.: 4 ft 6 in (1.37 m)
- Wheelbase: 19 ft 0 in (5.791 m)
- Cylinder size: 18 in × 24 in (457 mm × 610 mm)

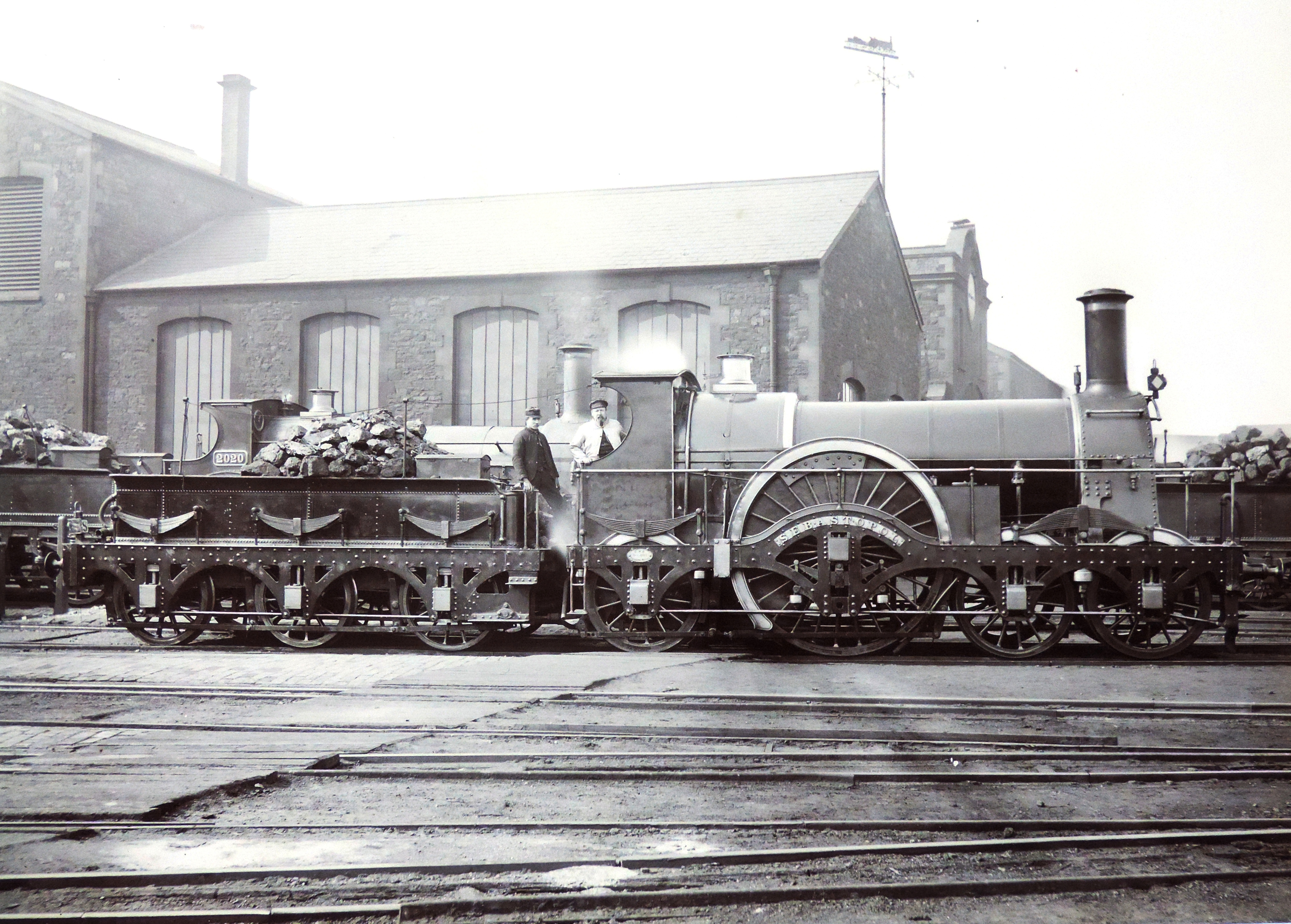
Sebastopol

Name	Built	Withdrawn	Details and information
Balaklava	1871	1892	Name reused from Iron Duke class locomotive withdrawn in 1875 (see above for details).
Hirondelle	1871	1890	Name reused from Iron Duke class locomotive withdrawn in 1873 (see above for details).
Iron Duke	1873	1892	Name reused from Iron Duke class locomotive withdrawn in 1871 (see above for details).
Timour	1873	1892	Name reused from Iron Duke class locomotive withdrawn in 1871 (see above for details).
Sultan	1876	1892	Name reused from Iron Duke class locomotive withdrawn in 1874 (see above for details).
Tartar	1876	1892	Name reused from Iron Duke class locomotive withdrawn in 1876 (see above for details).
Warlock	1876	1892	Name reused from Iron Duke class locomotive withdrawn in 1874 (see above for details).
Amazon	1878	1892	Name reused from Iron Duke class locomotive withdrawn in 1877 (see above for details).
Courier	1878	1892	Name reused from Iron Duke class locomotive withdrawn in 1877 (see above for details).
Crimea	1878	1892	Name reused from Iron Duke class locomotive withdrawn in 1876 (see above for details).
Eupatoria	1878	1892	Name reused from Iron Duke class locomotive withdrawn in 1876 (see above for details).
Inkermann	1878	1892	Name reused from Iron Duke class locomotive withdrawn in 1877 (see above for details).
Lightning	1878	1892	Name reused from Iron Duke class locomotive withdrawn in 1878 (see above for details).
Alma	1880	1892	Name reused from Iron Duke class locomotive withdrawn in 1872 (see above for details).
Bulkeley	1880	1892	This locomotive worked the last broad gauge passenger train out of London Paddington station on the afternoon of 20 May 1892. It worked this as far as Bristol Temple Meads and then returned early the following morning with the last train from Penzance, thus being the last broad gauge locomotive to work a passenger train on the main line. The name, Bulkeley, honoured a long-standing Great Western Railway director. It had previously been carried on a Sir Watkin class 0-6-0T that had been sold to the South Devon Railway Company in 1872.
Dragon	1880	1892	Name reused from Iron Duke class locomotive withdrawn in 1872 (see above for details).
Emperor	1880	1892	Name reused from Iron Duke class locomotive withdrawn in 1873 (see above for details).
Great Britain	1880	1892	Name reused from Iron Duke class locomotive withdrawn in 1880 (see above for details).
Sebastopol	1880	1892	Name reused from Iron Duke class locomotive withdrawn in 1880 (see above for details).
Great Western	1888	1892	Great Western had the honour of hauling the last broad gauge "Cornishman" service from London Paddington, which was the last through train to Penzance, although the locomotives were changed at Bristol Temple Meads. The name was reused from an Iron Duke class locomotive withdrawn in 1870 (see above for details).
Prometheus	1888	1892	Name reused from Iron Duke class locomotive withdrawn in 1887 (see above for details).
Tornado	1888	1892	Name reused from Iron Duke class locomotive withdrawn in 1881 (see above for details).

=== Replica ===
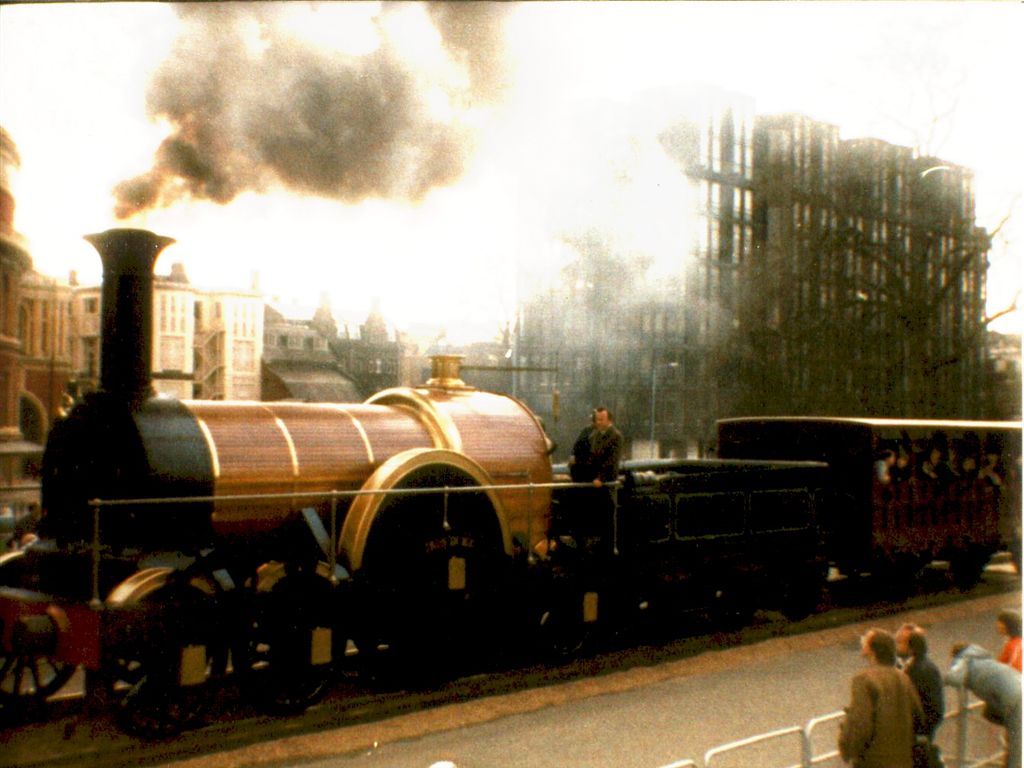
1985 replica of Iron Duke

A working replica of Iron Duke was constructed in 1985 using parts from two Hunslet Austerity tanks for the 'Great Western 150' celebrations. It is part of the National Railway Collection but is currently on long-term loan to the Didcot Railway Centre, which has a section of working broad gauge track. The boiler certificate has expired so it cannot currently be steamed.

The replica appeared in The Railway Series book Thomas and the Great Railway Show, in which it was portrayed with whiskery eyebrows and a walrus moustache.
