= BBÖ 12 =

BBÖ 12 DRB 69.0 ÖBB 69
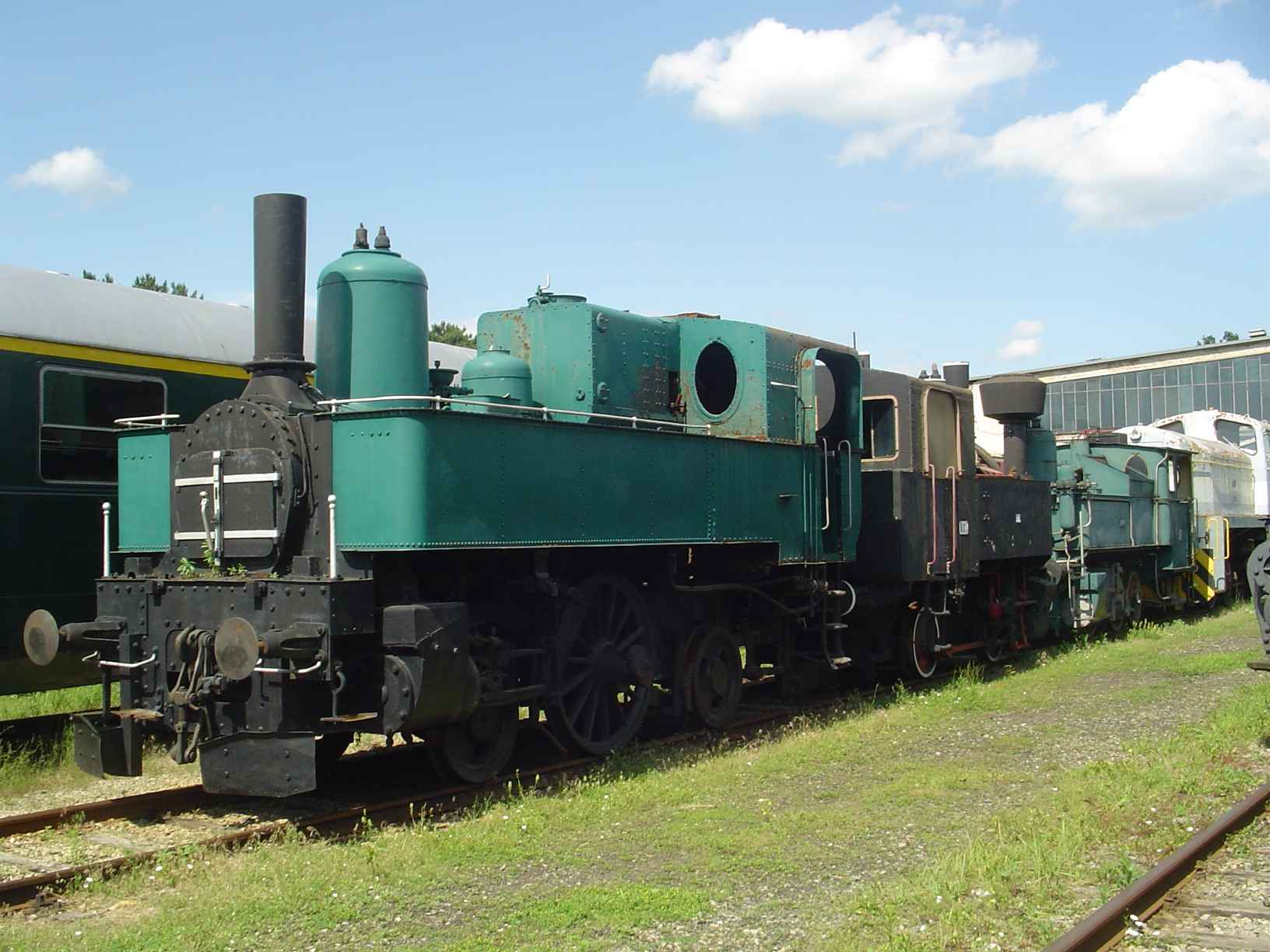
Type and origin
- Power type: Steam
- Rebuilder: Lokomotivfabrik Floridsdorf
- Rebuild date: 1934, 1937
- Number rebuilt: 2
Specifications
- Configuration
  - Whyte: 2-2-2T
  - UIC: 1A1 n2t
- Gauge: 1,435 mm (4 ft 8 1/2 in)
- Leading dia.: 870 mm (2 ft 10 1/4 in)
- Driver dia.: 1,450 mm (4 ft 9 1/8 in)
- Trailing dia.: 870 mm (2 ft 10 1/4 in)
- Wheelbase
  - Engine: 3.300 m (10 ft 9 7/8 in)
- Length: 7.927 m (26 ft 1/8 in) over buffers
- Height: 3.880 m (12 ft 8 3/4 in)
- Adhesive weight: 13.0 tonnes (12.8 long tons; 14.3 short tons)
- Loco weight: 32.0 tonnes (31.5 long tons; 35.3 short tons)
- Fuel type: Oil
- Fuel capacity: 1.2 tonnes (1.2 long tons; 1.3 short tons)
- Water cap.: 4,000 L (880 imp gal; 1,100 US gal)
- Firebox
  - Grate area: 1.04 m^{2} (11.2 sq ft)
- Boiler
  - Small tubes: 99 off
- Boiler pressure: 11 kg/cm^{2} (156 psi; 1.08 MPa)
- Heating surface
  - Firebox: 4.35 m^{2} (46.8 sq ft)
  - Total surface: 53.55 m^{2} (576.4 sq ft)
- Cylinders: 2
- Cylinder size: 345 mm × 480 mm (13 9/16 in × 18 7/8 in)
Performance figures
- Maximum speed: 80 km/h (50 mph)
Career
- Operators: Bundesbahn Österreich; → Deutsche Reichsbahn; → Österreichische Bundesbahnen
- Numbers: BBÖ 12.01–02; DRB 69 001–002; ÖBB 69.02
- Preserved: ÖBB 69.02

The BBÖ 12 was a class of two 2-2-2T express train tank locomotives with the Federal Railway of Austria (Bundesbahnen Österreichs, BBÖ).

Convinced by the performance of the kkStB 112 series, the BBÖ decided in 1934 to procure tank engines for regional express services as well. For reasons of cost however, they achieved this by converting kkStB 97 series 0-6-0 tank locomotives built in 1898 by Krauss/Linz). One unit was converted by the Lokomotivfabrik Floridsdorf in 1934 and another in 1937. Locomotives 97.153 and 97.152 were used for the conversion. The boiler and the valve gear were used unchanged. Oil-firing was provided, the tank for which was installed on the rear section of the boiler barrel, and enabled one-man operation. The engines were given a special livery with the water tanks and driver's cab being painted light green.

The locomotives performed well in service but no more were converted, because from 1935 the BBÖ DT 1 was available for short express trains.

In 1938 the Deutsche Reichsbahn took the engines over as 69 001 and 69 002. Only the latter was still in service after the Second World War. It became ÖBB 69.02 in the Austrian Federal Railways (ÖBB) and was used on a bridge inspection train. This engine is currently preserved.

== See also ==
- Deutsche Reichsbahn
- List of DRG locomotives and railbuses
