= OKa1 =

Class of 20 Latvian 2-2-2T locomotives

PKP class OKa1
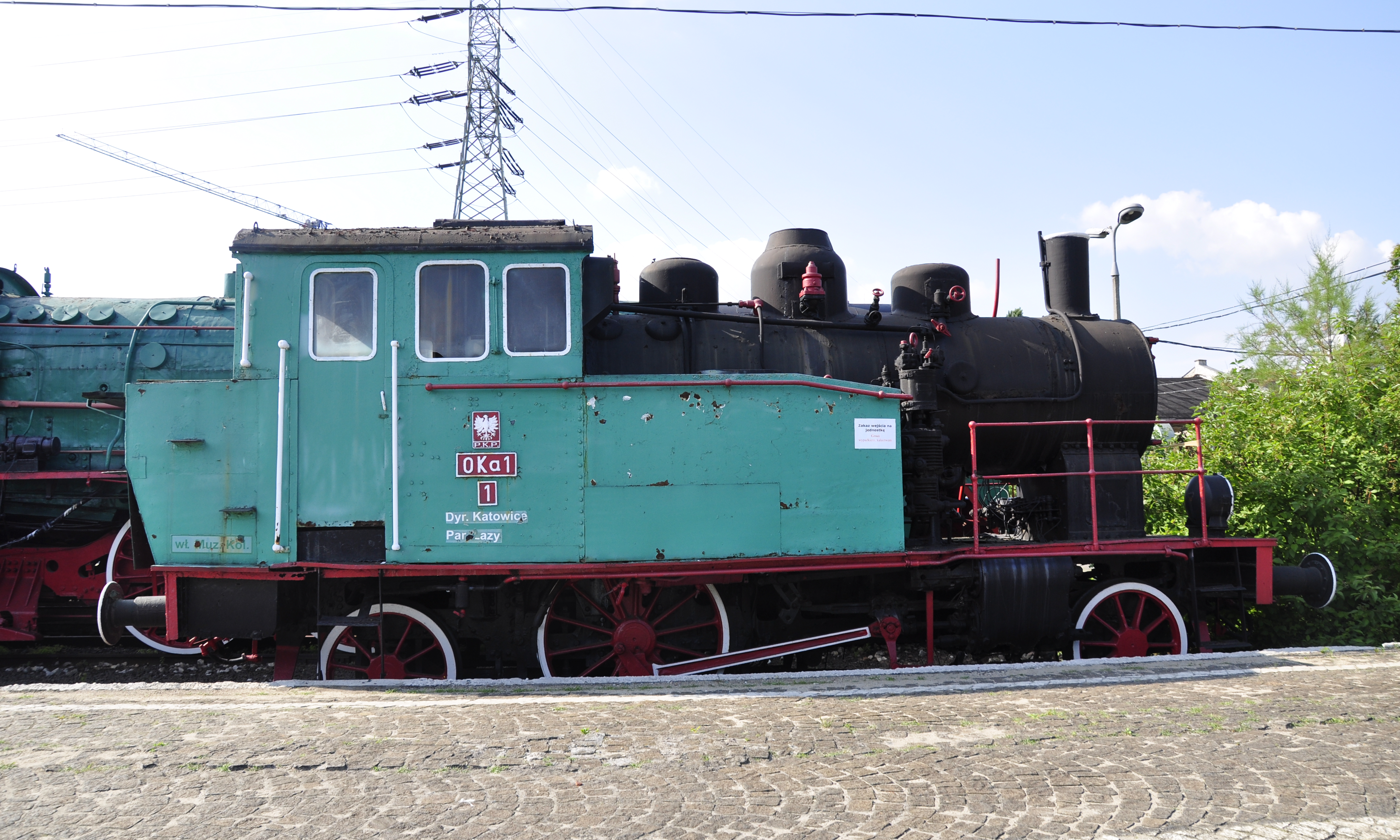
- OKa-1 at the Railway Museum in Warsaw
Type and origin
- Power type: Steam
- Builder: Hohenzollern (231-233); Krupp (234-236); Henschel & Sohn (237-239); TFD (240-242; 248-250); TFL (243-247)
- Build date: 1928-1934
- Total produced: 20
Specifications
- Configuration
  - Whyte: 2-2-2T
  - UIC: 1A1 h2t
- Gauge: 1,524 mm (5 ft); 1,435 mm (4 ft 8 1/2 in)
- Axle load: 17.3 long tons (17.6 t)
- Superheater
  - Heating area: 24.6 m^{2} (265 sq ft)
- Cylinders: Two, outside
- Cylinder size: 320 mm × 520 mm (13 in × 20 in)
- Valve gear: Walschaerts
Career
- Operators: Latvian State Railways; Polish State Railways
- Retired: 1969
- Preserved: OKa1-1
- Current owner: Warsaw Railway Museum

OKa1 was the designation used by the PKP for light steam locomotive of the former Latvian State Railways Tk series. Built in 1928–1934, the units were of German and Latvian production. After 1945, it was used by the Polish State Railways; it was the only steam locomotive in Poland with one driving axle.

== History ==
In 1928, management of the Latvian State Railways placed an order for the construction of light and economical locomotives to support suburban traffic. A total of 20 were purchased, of which the first three were built in Germany (Nos. 231–233) at the Hohenzollern plant in Düsseldorf. Locomotive trials were successful, so in 1931 a further six were ordered from German plants (234-236 - Krupp and 237-239 - Henschel), with final assembly and the construction of various parts (such as the driver's cab and water tanks) carried out by the Latvian Fēnikss plant in Riga. Slight improvements to the design were made over the first batch of locomotives delivered. In 1933–1934, the last 11 locomotives were built in Latvian railway workshops: 6 at TFD in Daugavpils (240-242, 248–250) and 5 at TFL in Liepāja (243-247). They were used as an alternative to diesel railcars on lesser-used passenger routes. The locomotives were normally used on 1,524 mm gauge tracks, but also had interchangeable axles for use on standard gauge tracks of 1,435 mm.

== Usage ==
The locomotives were assigned to the depots in Šķirotava, Jelgava, Dyneburg, Rezekne and Krustpils. In September 1940, after the annexation of Latvia by the USSR, the steam locomotives were taken over by the Soviet Railways. During the Great Patriotic War, some of the Tk series locomotives were captured by the Germans, 5 of which were later recaptured by the Soviet Red Army, and after the war there were 12 steam locomotives of this series in the USSR. They were withdrawn by Soviet Railways in the 1950s, and a few were transferred to various industries. After 1945, there were two Tk locomotives on the Polish State Railways: No. 235 (marked as OKa1-1) and No. 242 (marked as TKa-242). Oka1-1 was withdrawn from service in 1969, and previously ran service trains in the area of the Łazy marshalling yard. The TKa-242 steam locomotive worked until 1957 in the depot in Kutno. The OKa1-1 locomotive was selected for museum preservation and is now housed in the Railway Museum in Warsaw. After the war, three locomotives were used on West German railways (withdrawn at the end of 1951), and one on East German railways. The other two were lost, while OKa1-1 was left behind, would be housed in the Warsaw Railway Museum.

== Technical details ==
The locomotives had bogies with an 1A1 axle system for use with superheated steam. The leading axle and drive axle were rigidly fixed to the underframe, the supporting rear axle was on a Bissel semi-truck (the opposite of what was the most common arrangement). The Tk series locomotives were equipped with a pneumatic mechanism that allowed a load reduction on the rear running axle and thus increased the load on the driving axle by 50% when starting the locomotive. The tractive weight as well as the load on the driving axle was 15.4 tons, with a maximum axle load of 17.3 tons. The locomotive had a boiler with 55 tubes, a diameter of 39.5 / 44.5 mm (heating area 20.5 m^{2}) and 26 tubes having a diameter of 100.5 / 108 mm (heating area 24.6 m^{2}). The boiler was equipped with a superheater, having an area of 21.8 m^{2}. It also had a twin-cylinder, twin engine configuration with a cylinder bore of 320 mm and a piston stroke of 520 mm and was equipped with a Walschaerts valve gear. The Tk series in Latvia also included two other locomotives (and tender): Tk-226 with a C-axel arrangement and Tk-227 with a B-axel arrangement. Latvian locomotives of the Tk series should not be confused with the Lithuanian series of Tk locomotives.
