= Type 69 (disambiguation) =

The Type 69 is a Chinese main battle tank.

Type 69 may also refer to:

- Type 69 RPG, Sino-Soviet rocket-propelled grenade
- Peugeot Type 69, alternate name for the Peugeot Bébé

== See also ==
- Class 69 (disambiguation)
