= GWR Star Class =

Class of 12 British locomotives

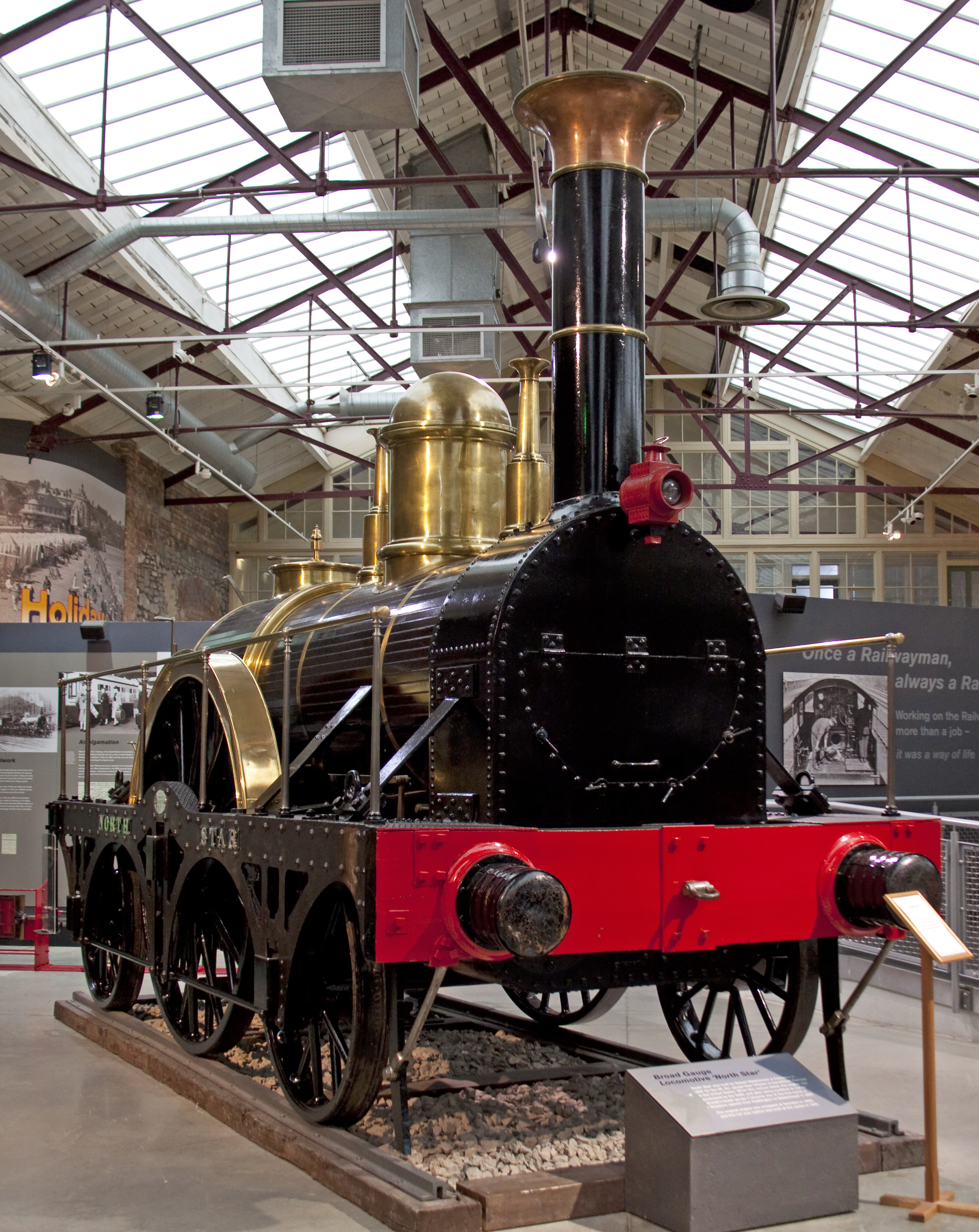
North Star replica (built in 1923 using some parts of the original) on display at Swindon, England, 2011

The Great Western Railway (GWR) Star Class of 2-2-2 broad gauge steam locomotives were used for passenger train work. Designed by Robert Stephenson, the class was introduced into service between November 1838 and November 1841, and withdrawn between April 1864 and September 1871.

A total of twelve Star Class locomotives were manufactured. Notably, they were given the romantic or colloquial (rather than scientific) names of astronomical bodies. By the time the last had been delivered, GWR engineer Daniel Gooch had designed and taken delivery of several of his larger Firefly Class.

== North Star and Morning Star ==
These two were built in 1836 by Robert Stephenson & Co. for the New Orleans Railway, which had a gauge of 5 ft 6 in (1,676 mm). That railway experienced financial difficulties, and was unable to accept them; Stephensons sold the locomotives to the GWR, altering the gauge to 7 ft 1/4 in (2,140 mm) before delivery, and in the case of North Star, also fitting 7 ft 0 in (2,134 mm) driving wheels in place of the original 6 ft 6 in (1,981 mm) wheels.

North Star
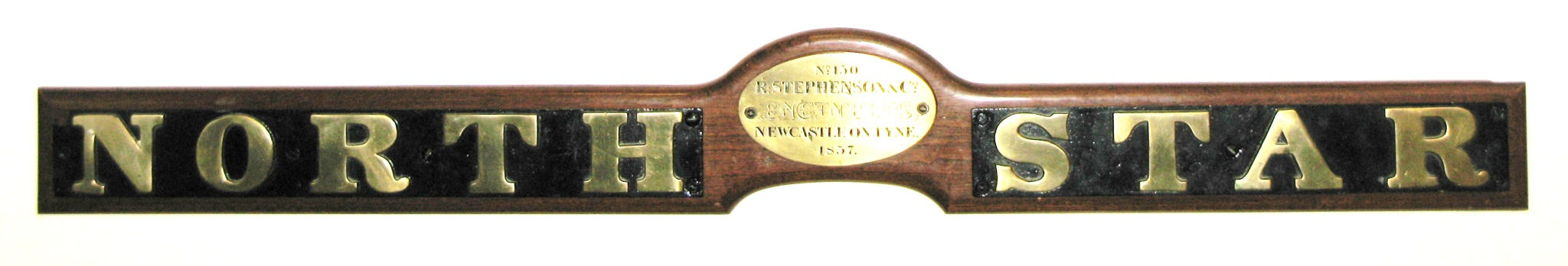
Type and origin
- Power type: Steam
- Designer: Robert Stephenson
- Builder: R Stephenson & Co.
Specifications
- Configuration
  - Whyte: 2-2-2
- Gauge: 7 ft 1/4 in (2,140 mm)
- Leading dia.: 4 ft 0 in (1,219 mm)
- Driver dia.: 7 ft 0 in (2,134 mm)
- Trailing dia.: 4 ft 0 in (1,219 mm)
- Wheelbase: 12 ft 4 in (3,759 mm)
- Cylinder size: 16 in × 16 in (406 mm × 406 mm), dia x stroke
Career
- Operators: Great Western Railway
- Class: Star

- North Star (1837–1871)
  North Star arrived at Maidenhead Bridge station by barge on 28 November 1837; on 31 May 1838 it worked the inaugural train for the company's directors. In 1854 it was rebuilt with 16 in × 18 in (406 mm × 457 mm) cylinders and the wheelbase lengthened by 1 foot (305 mm). It was withdrawn in 1871 but kept at Swindon Works along with Lord of the Isles until 1906, when both were dismantled. However, many parts were later recovered to build a replica.
  'The north star' is one of two common alternative names for Polaris (its other being 'the pole star'). It is the only visible polar star in either hemisphere, and has long been used for navigation due to its constant fixed and unmoving appearance due north in the night sky. The commercial park north of Swindon Station is called North Star after the engine and includes streets named North Star Avenue and Polaris Way.
- Morning Star (1839–1869)
  This, the second Star Class, was not delivered until 14 months after the North Star. It had smaller 6 ft 6 in (1,981 mm) wheels, as had been intended when it was constructed for the New Orleans Railway; the wheelbase was 12 ft 6 in (3,810 mm).
  Named after 'the morning star', the common periodic name for the planet Venus (at times the brightest object in the night sky) when seen in the eastern sky just before sunrise, its motion then appearing to "lead" the sun for many mornings.

== Later locomotives ==
Evening Star
Type and origin
- Power type: Steam
- Designer: Robert Stephenson
- Builder: R Stephenson & Co.
Specifications
- Configuration
  - Whyte: 2-2-2
- Gauge: 7 ft 1/4 in (2,140 mm)
- Leading dia.: 4 ft 0 in (1,219 mm)
- Driver dia.: 7 ft 0 in (2,134 mm)
- Trailing dia.: 4 ft 0 in (1,219 mm)
- Wheelbase: 12 ft 5 in (3,785 mm)
- Cylinder size: 15 in × 18 in (381 mm × 457 mm), dia x stroke
Career
- Operators: Great Western Railway
- Class: Star

North Star and Morning Star having proved successful (in contrast to those from other makers delivered between 1837 and 1840), Gooch ordered ten more from Stephensons to basically the same design as the first two; they were built in 1839–41, although there were variations in design.

- Bright Star (1841–1864)
  A 'bright star' is one clearly visible in the night sky, and generally denotes one of a few that appear to shine more than most.
- Dog Star (1839–1869)
  After withdrawal, Dog Star was used as a stationary boiler at Paddington. Named after 'the dog star', the common name for Sirius, brightest star in the night sky and found in the constellation Canis Major (Lat: 'greater dog', from whence Sirius' common name).
- Evening Star (1839–1871)
  Named after 'the evening star', the common periodic name for the planet Venus (at times the brightest object in the night sky) when seen in the western sky just before sunset, its motion then appearing to "follow" the sun for many evenings.
- Lode Star (1841–1870)
  A 'lodestar' denotes any easily found star that is used to aid navigation (for example Polaris). Now an archaic term, in Middle English it meant 'course star' or 'lead star'.
- Polar Star (1840–1870)
  This locomotive was built with 15 1/2 in × 18 in (394 mm × 457 mm) cylinders. It was rebuilt as a 4-2-2T. Its name is assisted with navigation: a polar star is one that appears fixed and unmoving over the Earth's North or South Pole and is thus used for a guide. The only one visible is Polaris (a.k.a. the Pole Star or North Star).
- Red Star (1840–1865)
  This locomotive was rebuilt as a 4-2-2T tank locomotive. Its name has no particular association with any specific star, although prominent red stars visible from the northern hemisphere include Aldebaran, Arcturus, Antares and Betelgeuse.
- Rising Star (1840–1871)
  This locomotive had a 14 ft 6 in (4,420 mm) wheelbase; at some time it was rebuilt as a 4-2-2T tank locomotive. On 7 September 1841 it ran over an earthslip near Chippenham, but the rest of the train (including Tiger, coupled behind) was derailed. The locomotive's name reflected the company's status: a 'rising star' is the term for any star appearing to climb the sky (rather than moving low across the horizon), and is often used metaphorically to mean someone "new" whose reputation is increasing rapidly.
- Royal Star (1841–1871)
  This locomotive was built with 15 1/2 in × 19 in (394 mm × 483 mm) cylinders and a 12 ft 7 in (3,835 mm) wheelbase. The four Persian 'royal stars' are Aldebaran, Regulus, Antares and Fomalhaut, said to guard the four quarters of the annual night sky.
- Shooting Star (1841–1871)
  This locomotive was rebuilt as a 4-2-2T tank locomotive. A 'shooting star' is the descriptive term for a meteor.
- Western Star (1841–1866)
  This locomotive was built with 15 1/2 in × 19 in (394 mm × 483 mm) cylinders and a 12 ft 7 in (3,835 mm) wheelbase. After withdrawal it was used as a stationary boiler at Oxford. Its name reflected the GWR's westerly direction: 'the western star' has no particular association with any specific star (although Antares was the quarter guardian of the western gate in Persian 'royal star' mythology).

== Replica ==
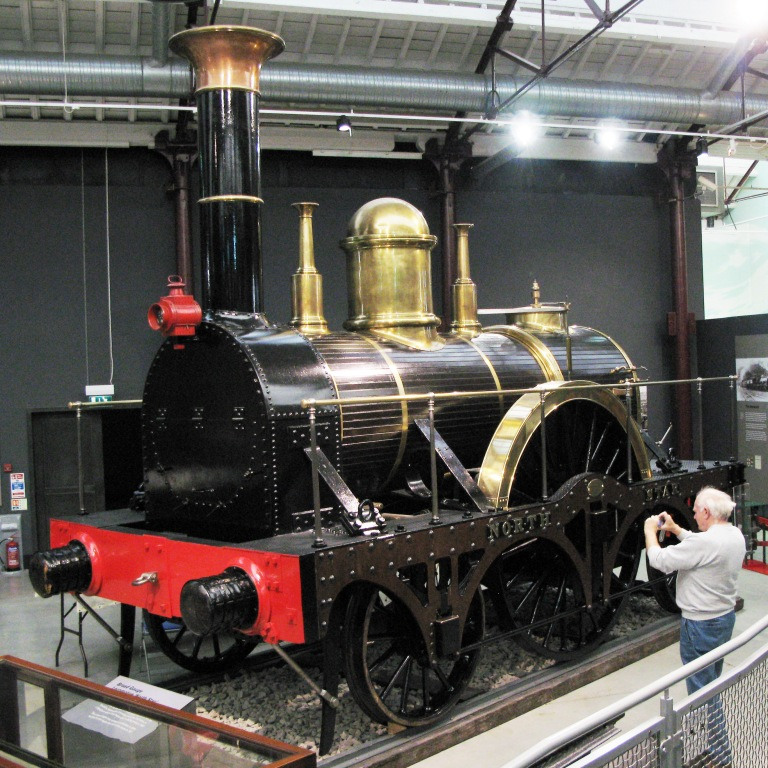
North Star replica (built in 1923 using some parts of the original) on display at Swindon, England, 2008

A non-working replica of North Star was constructed for the 1923 Cavalcade, and is now housed at Swindon Steam Railway Museum.

It made use of some of the parts of the original North Star, scrapped as recently as 1906, but is not capable of being steamed. Although it was featured in the railway's centenary film in 1935, it was pushed by another locomotive.
