= Dragbox =

A dragbox (also drag-box or drag box) is a substantial, often cast metal, part of a locomotive to which the coupling mechanism is attached to allow the locomotive to pull a train.
