= Beuth (locomotive) =

Prussian steam locomotive

BEUTH
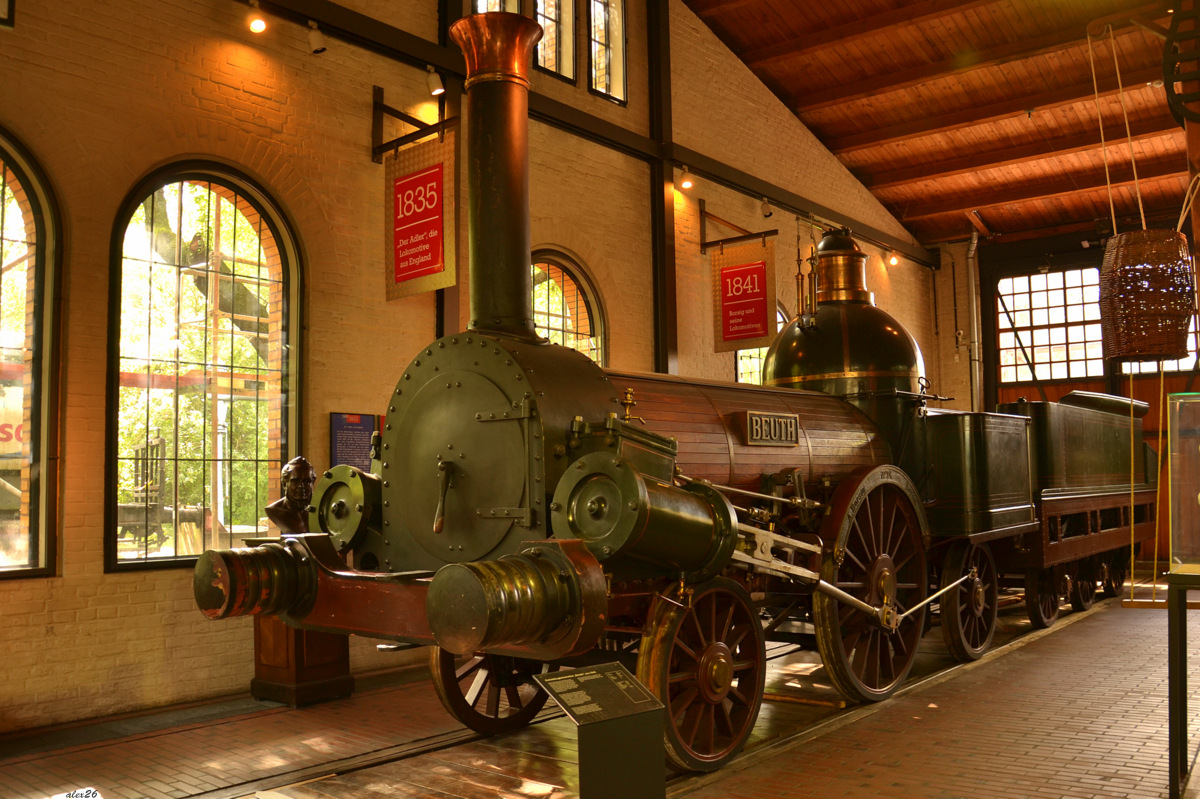
- Beuth replica at the Deutsches Technikmuseum Berlin
Type and origin
- Builder: Borsig
- Serial number: 24
- Build date: 1843
- Total produced: 1
Specifications
- Length: 6,143 mm (20 ft 1.9 in) without tender
- Service weight: 18.5 t without tender
- Boiler pressure: 5.5 kp/cm^{2}
- Heating surface
  - Firebox: 0.83 m^{2}
Career
- Operators: Berlin-Anhalt Railway Company
- Retired: 1864

BEUTH was a 2-2-2 steam locomotive manufactured by Borsig in 1843 and was the first steam locomotive developed independently in Germany. Borsig had previously built locomotives based on American models. The locomotive won a race against a model by Stephenson by about ten minutes and was considered the prototype of fast German locomotive designs for the next ten years. A driving axle and two running axles as well as a vertical boiler ensured comparatively high speeds. It was named after the head of the Prussian trade academy Christian Peter Wilhelm Beuth, who had prophesied to August Borsig that nothing would ever come of it. A replica of the locomotive is currently on display in the German Museum of Technology in Berlin.

== Technical specifications ==
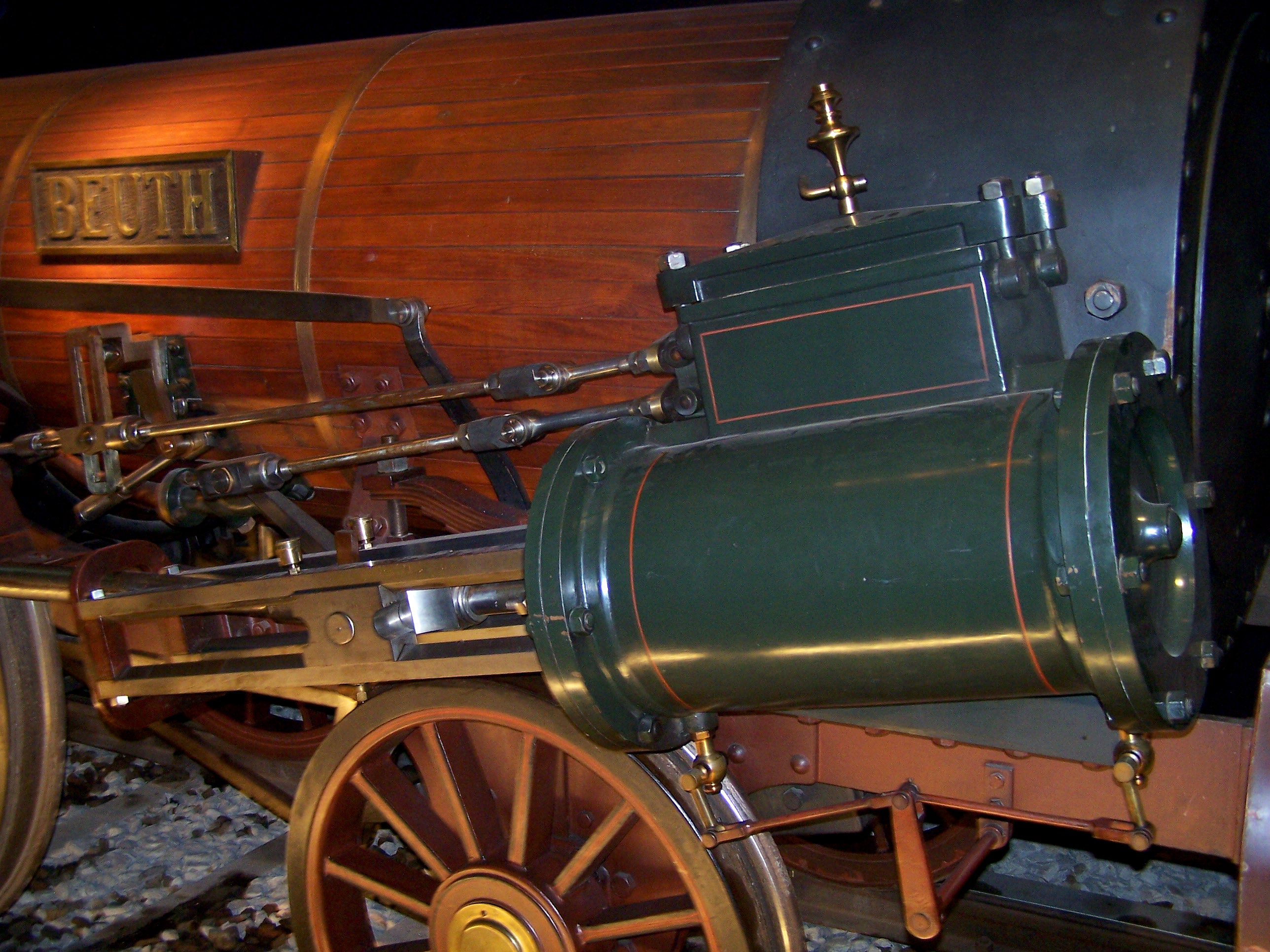
Right cylinder of the 1912 replica

Compared to the Adler, the Beuth had larger cylinders mounted externally. This meant that a crank axle that was difficult to manufacture could be dispensed with. The connecting rods of the cylinders acted directly on the driving wheels located in the middle using eccentrically mounted crank pins pressed into the wheel spoke system. This meant that the crank pin and connecting rod bearings with the highest shear forces were more easily accessible for lubricating and inspection. The higher steam consumption of the engine required a more powerful and larger steam boiler in the form of a long boiler and a vertical boiler with a high steam dome. This cupola-like boiler is typical of all early Borsig designs such as the Borsig and the Borussia that followed the Beuth. The rear wheel set under the open driver's cab of the Beuth is also found in many later designs. The Beuth was actually the first steam locomotive to be produced in series with classic features that were used in almost all later designs worldwide.

The locomotive's design included bar frames and a 2-2-2 wheel arrangement.

== History ==
Named after a teacher of August Borsig at the Königliches Gewerbeinstitut, the Beuth was the 24th locomotive built by the manufacturer. Beuth ended up being a great success, and its valve design became de facto standard for locomotives for decades to come. The original locomotive was scrapped.

The Beuth was displayed at the Berlin Trade Exhibition in 1844 and then operated by the Berlin-Anhalt Railway. A total of 71 examples of this design were produced in a kind of series and they were used throughout northern Germany. A further development of the Beuth by Borsig went in service as Borussia from 1844 e.g. delivering services on the Cologne-Minden Railway; other manufacturers at the time took the Beuth as a prototype.

== Replica ==
A replica of the locomotive was constructed in 1912, which is exhibited in the German Museum of Technology in Berlin.
