= 2-2-2 =

Locomotive wheel arrangement

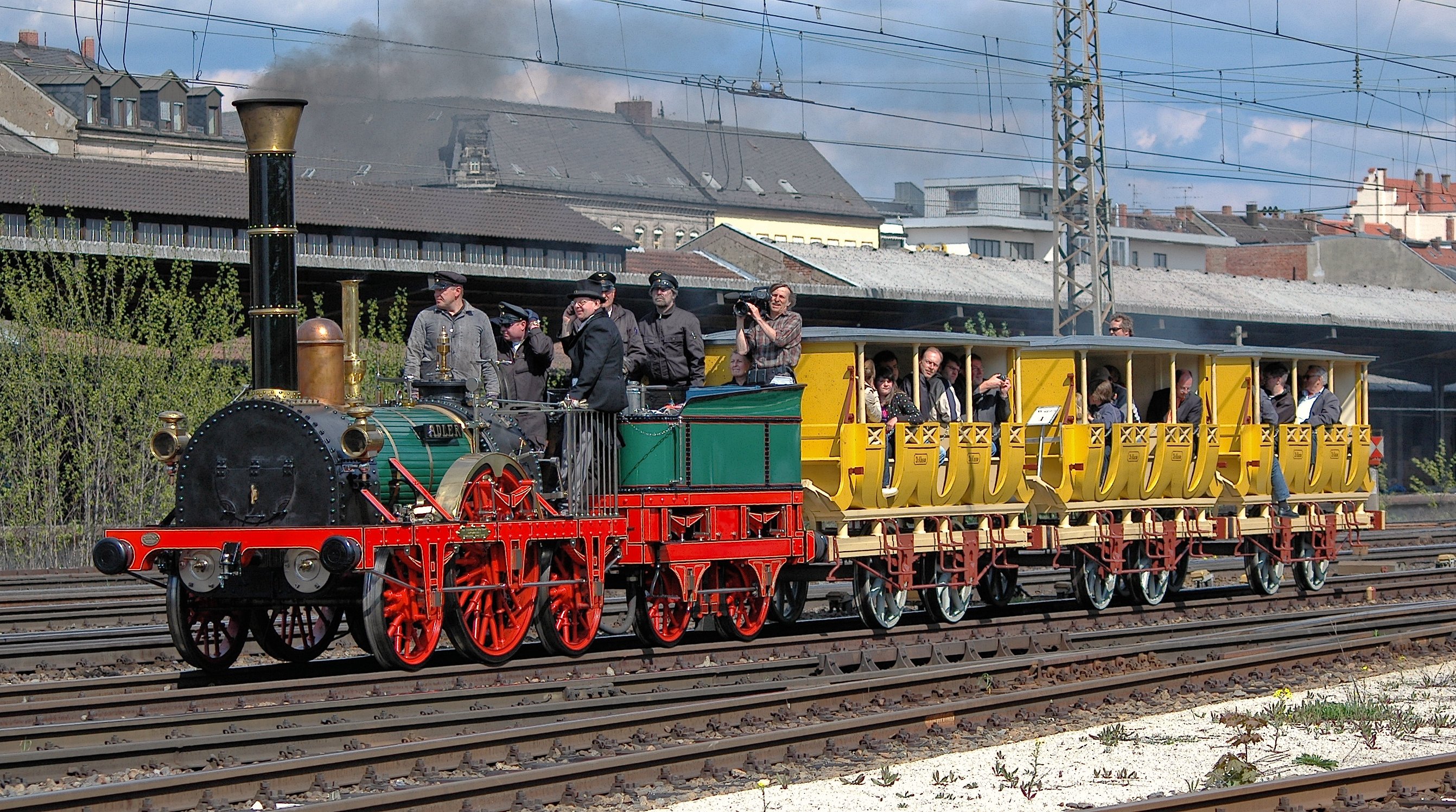
Replica of Adler at Fürth, May 2008

Under the Whyte notation for the classification of steam locomotives, 2-2-2 represents the wheel arrangement of two leading wheels on one axle, two powered driving wheels on one axle, and two trailing wheels on one axle. The wheel arrangement both provided more stability and enabled a larger firebox than the earlier 0-2-2 and 2-2-0 types. This wheel arrangement is sometimes described as a Single, although this name could be used to describe any kind of locomotive with a single pair of driving wheels.

== Equivalent classifications ==
Other equivalent classifications are:

- UIC classification: 1A1 (also known as German classification and Italian classification)
- French classification: 111
- Turkish classification: 13
- Swiss classification: 1/3

== History ==
The 2-2-2 configuration appears to have been developed by Robert Stephenson & Company in 1834, as an enlargement of their 2-2-0 Planet configuration, offering more stability and a larger firebox. The new type became known as Stephenson's Patentee locomotive. Adler, the first successful locomotive to operate in Germany, was a Patentee supplied by Robert Stephenson & Company in component form in December, 1835 was one of the earliest examples. Other examples were exported to the Netherlands, Russia and Italy. By 1838 the 2-2-2 had become the standard passenger design by Robert Stephenson & Company.

Eighteen of the first nineteen locomotives ordered by Isambard Kingdom Brunel for the opening of the Great Western Railway in 1837/8 were of the 2-2-2 type. These included six 2-2-2 locomotives built by Charles Tayleur at his Vulcan Foundry. Also in 1837 the successful North Star broad gauge locomotive was delivered to the Great Western Railway by Stephenson, becoming the first of a class of twelve locomotives by 1841.

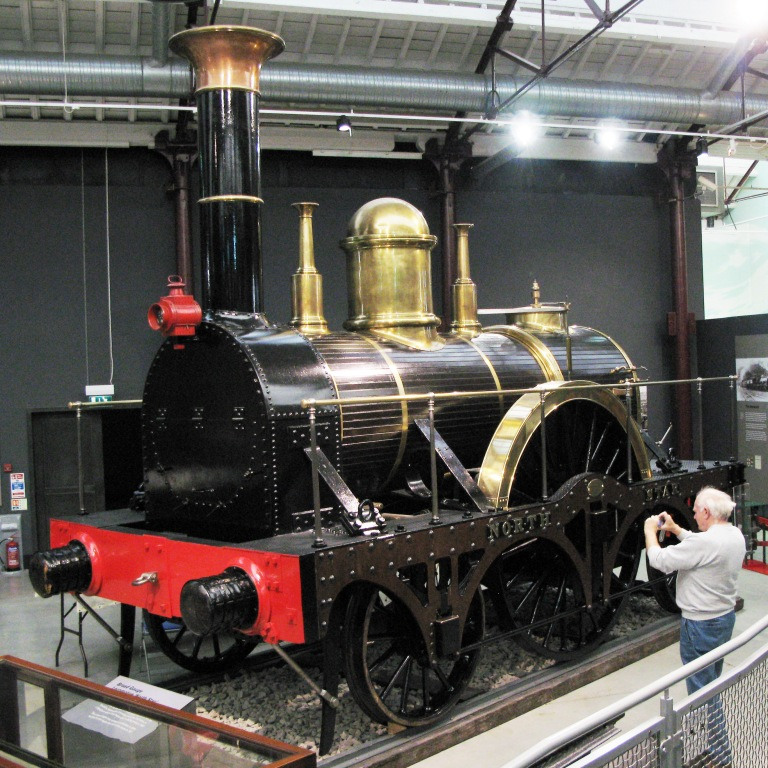
Great Western Railway North Star at Swindon

=== Later UK developments ===
Sharp, Roberts & Company constructed more than 600 2-2-2 locomotives between 1837 and 1857. Ten of these supplied to the Grand Junction Railway became the basis of Alexander Allan's successful designs for the railway from 1845 (the first of which, formerly named Columbine, is preserved). John Rennie supplied 2-2-2 locomotives to the London and Croydon Railway from 1838 and the London and Brighton Railway in 1840. Arend ("eagle") was one of the two first steam locomotives in the Netherlands, built by R. B. Longridge and Company of Bedlington, Northumberland in 1839.

The Great Western Railway continued to order both broad gauge and standard gauge locomotives on the railway, including the Firefly and Sun classes (1840–42), which were enlarged versions of North Star. Bury, Curtis and Kennedy supplied six 2-2-2 locomotives to the Bristol and Gloucester Railway in 1844, and fourteen to the Great Southern and Western Railway in Ireland in 1848, (the last of these has been preserved at Cork Kent railway station.

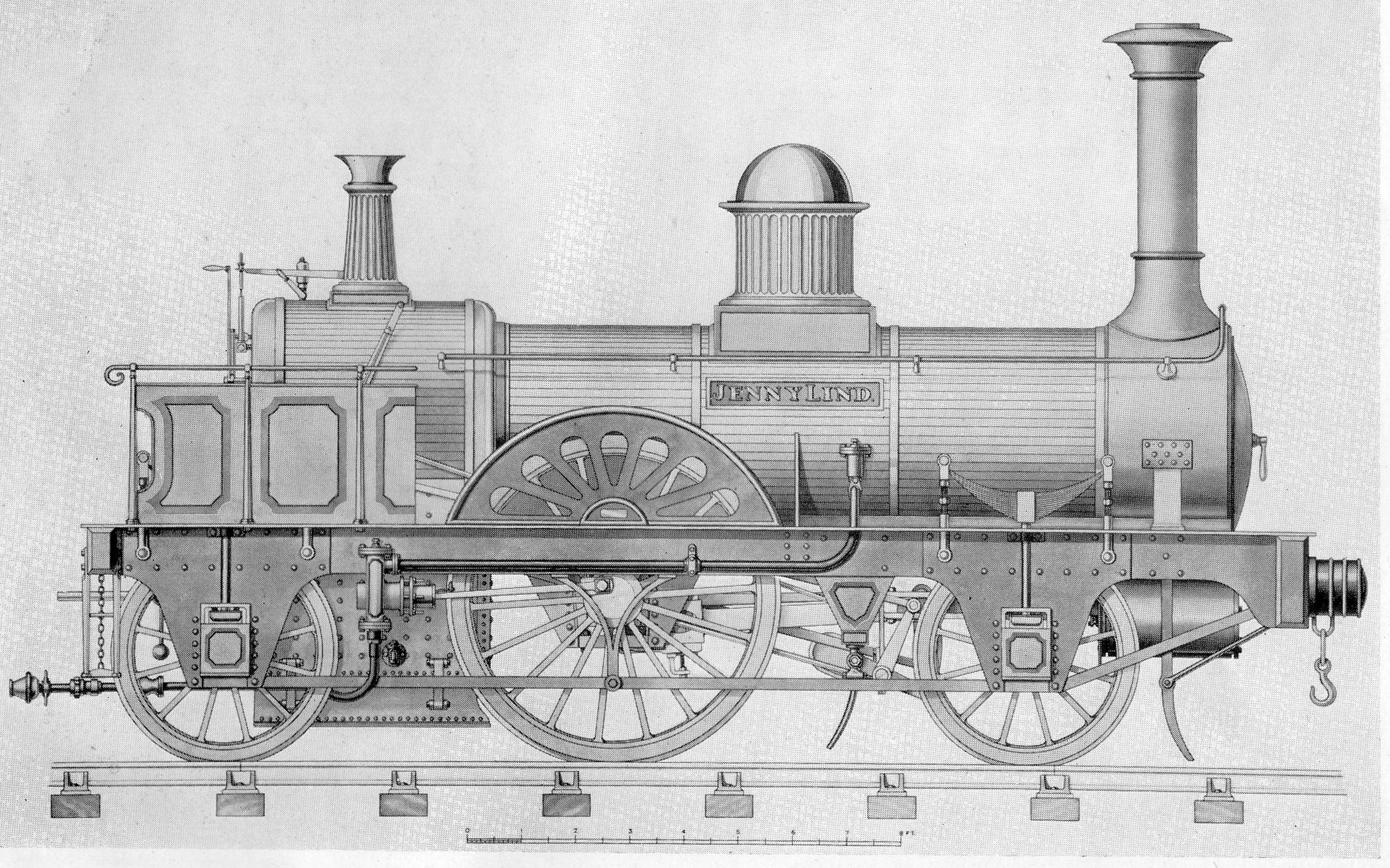
The original "Jenny Lind" locomotive, 1847.

The Jenny Lind locomotive, designed by David Joy and built in 1847 for the London, Brighton and South Coast Railway by the E. B. Wilson and Company of Leeds, became the basis of hundreds of similar passenger locomotives built during the 1840s and 1850s by this and other manufacturers for UK railways. The London and North Western Railway Cornwall locomotive was designed at Crewe Works as a 4-2-2 by Francis Trevithick in 1847, but was rebuilt as a 2-2-2 in 1858.

Although by the 1860s the 2-2-2 configuration was beginning to be superseded by the 2-4-0 type with better adhesion, the invention of steam sanding gave 2-2-2 singles a new lease of life, and they continued to be built until the 1890s. Notable late examples include William Stroudley's singles of 1874–1880, William Dean's 157 class of 1878–79, and his 3001 class (1891–92), both for the Great Western Railway. James Holden of the Great Eastern Railway created some 2-2-2 singles in 1889 by removing the coupling rod from a 2-4-0.

=== Belgium ===
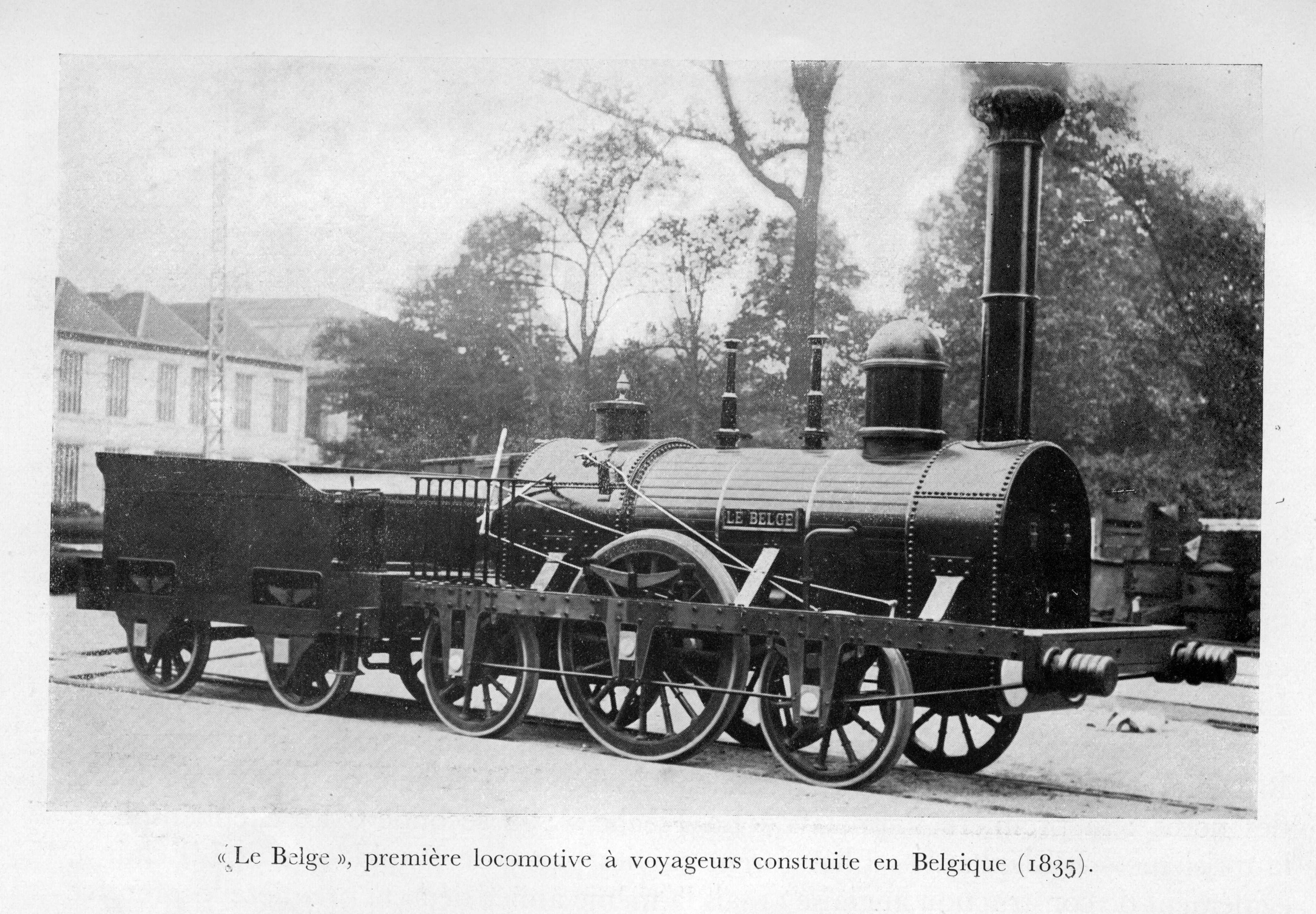
Replica of 'Le Belge' 1835

The first steam railway locomotive built in Belgium in 1835, and was built by John Cockerill under license to a design by Robert Stephenson & Company It was built for use on the first main line on the European mainland, the Brussels-Mechelen line. A replica was built at the workshops of Boissellerie Cognaut for the 150th anniversary of the formation of Belgium. Brussels-Mechelen line

=== Italy ===
Two 2-2-2 locomotives were imported from Longridge and Co of Bedlington Ironworks England for the Naples–Portici railway in 1839 named Bayard and Vesuvio. A replica of 'Bayard is at the Naples Railway Museum.

=== Germany ===
Most of the earliest locomotives to operate in what is now Germany before the mid-1840s were 2-2-2s delivered by UK manufacturers. However, by 1839 the type was also being built locally see List of Bavarian locomotives and railbuses. The Pegasus of 1839 was the first locomotive to be built by the Sächsische Maschinenbau-Compagnie in Chemnitz. August Borsig and Company manufactured Beuth in 1843 which was highly successful; its valve design became de facto standard for locomotives for decades to come. By 1846 he had manufactured more than a hundred similar locomotives. Both the Leipzig-Dresden Railway and Royal Bavarian State Railways (Königlich Bayerische Staatsbahn) built several 2-2-2 classes 1841–1859. Similarly, the Grand Duchy of Mecklenburg Friedrich-Franz Railway grouped various 2-2-2 steam locomotives procured from German manufacturers between 1848 and 1863 into its Mecklenburg I class.

=== Austria ===
The Imperial Austrian State Railways (kaiserlich-königliche österreichische Staatsbahnen or kkStB) built two successful locomotives of this wheel arrangement in 1907. Similarly the Federal Railway of Austria (BBÖ) built two examples of an express tank locomotive in 1934 and 1937.

=== Latvia ===
One of last 2-2-2 tank locomotives were ordered by Latvian Railways, for local traffic. The locomotives Tk class were designed by German Hohenzollern, and 20 were manufactured in Germany and Latvia in 1928–1934. They were next seized by Soviet railways. After World War II one served in Poland as OKa1 class.

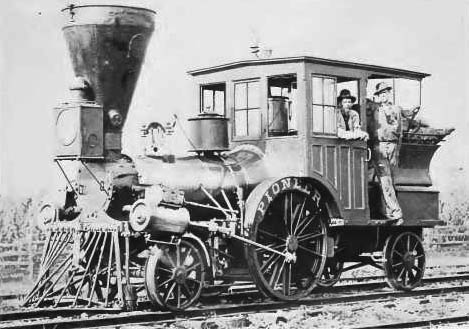
The locomotive "Pioneer" in service on the Cumberland Valley Railroad in the 1880s or 1890s.

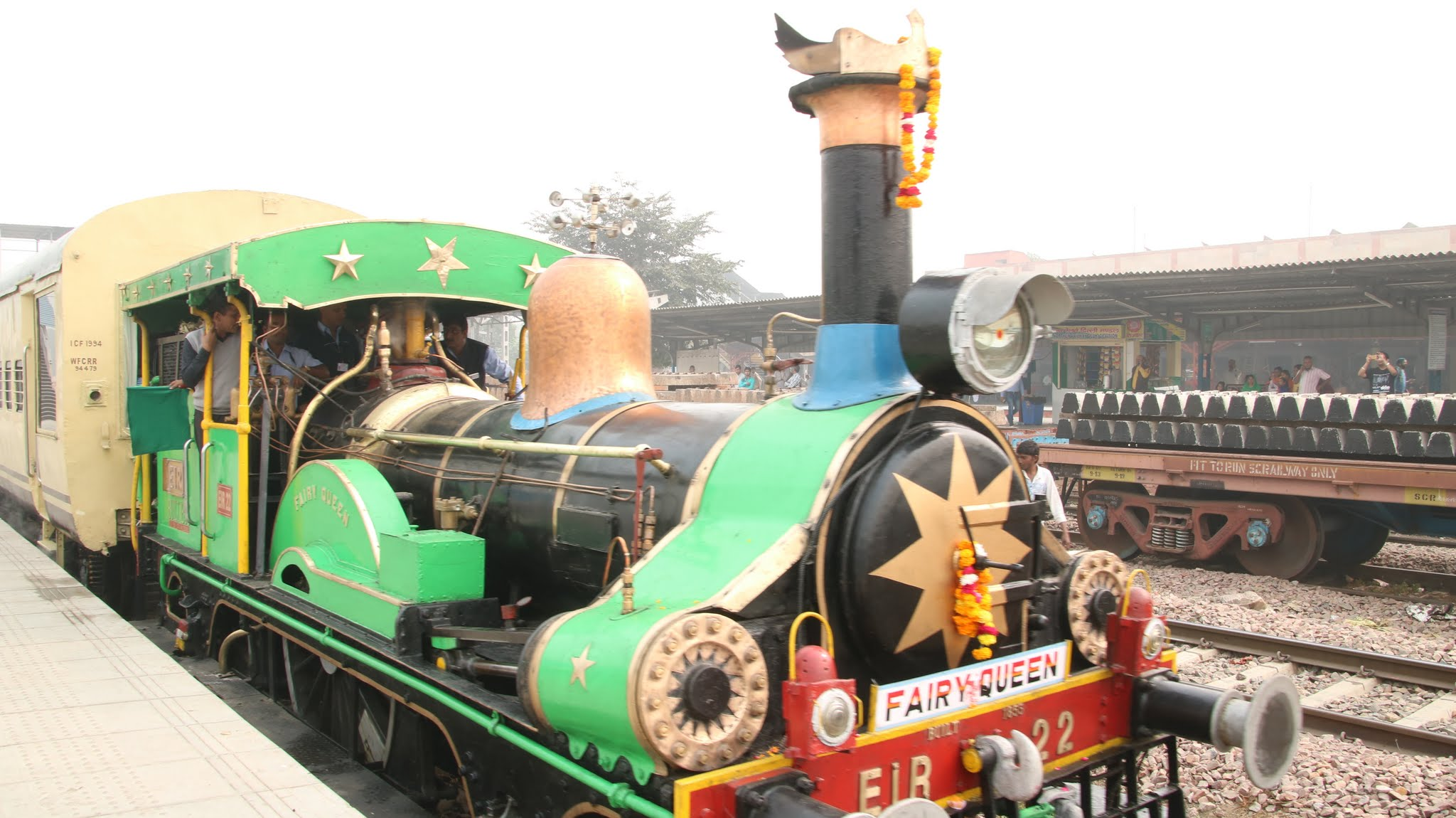
Fairy Queen, East India Railway, 2017

== Preserved examples and replicas ==
Image	Location	Address	Railroad	Road number/Name	builder	Year(s) built	Notes
	Nuremberg Transport Museum	Nuremberg, Germany,	Bavarian Ludwig Railway	Adler	Deutsche Reichsbahn repair works	1935	the serviceable Replica of Adler
	Nuremberg Transport Museum	Nuremberg, Germany,	Bavarian Ludwig Railway	Adler	Ausbesserungswerk in Munich-Freimann	1952	a non-serviceable replica of Adler
	Museum of the Great Western Railway	Swindon, England	Great Western Railway	North Star	Great Western Railway Swindon Works	1923	replica of North Star original built in 1837. North Star was originally going to be preserved but was scrapped as recently as 1906
	Railway Museum (Netherlands)	Utrecht, Netherlands	Hollandsche IJzeren Spoorweg-Maatschappij	De Arend	Central Workshop in Zwolle	1938	replica of Arend original built in 1839.
	Danish Railway Museum	Odense, Denmark	Det Sjællandske Jernbaneselskab	Odin	Danish Railway Museum (constructed at Roskilde roundhouse	2005-2018	replica of Odin original built in 1846
	National Railway Museum	York, England	London and North Western Railway	No.1868 Columbine	LNWR Crewe Works	1845	
	National Railway Museum	York, England	London and North Western Railway	No.3020 Cornwall	LNWR Crewe Works	1847	
	Cork Kent Station	Cork Ireland	Great Southern and Western Railway	GS&WR Bury No. 36	Bury, Curtis and Kennedy	1847	the oldest Steam locomotive in Ireland
	National Museum of American History	Washington, D.C. United States	Cumberland Valley Railroad	No.13 Pioneer	Seth Wilmarth	1851	was on lown to the National Museum of Railroad History & Innovation
	National Rail Museum, New Delhi	Chanakyapuri, New Delhi India	East Indian Railway Company	No.22	Kitson and Company	1855	It still operates for them today, making it the oldest operating steam locomotive in the world in regular service.
	Strasshof Railway Museum	Strasshof an der Nordbahn Lower Austria	Austrian Federal Railways	ÖBB 69.02	Lokomotivfabrik Floridsdorf	1937	
	National Railway Museum (Portugal)	Entroncamento, Portugal	Portuguese Railway Company	CP No.1 (D.Luiz)	Beyer, Peacock & Company	1862	for the Portuguese Royal Train. Currently is under major restoration at Entroncamento yard together with the Royal Train wagons.
	Warsaw Railway Museum	Warsaw, Poland	Polish State Railways	OKa1-1	Friedrich Krupp AG Hoesch-Krupp	1931	
	Canadian Railway Museum	Saint-Constant, Quebec, Canada	Champlain and St. Lawrence Railroad	John Molson	Kawasaki Heavy Industries	1970	original built in 1848.
	National Museum of Transportation	St. Louis, Missouri, United States	Philadelphia & Reading Coal & Iron Co.	Black Diamond	Baldwin Locomotive Works	1889	

== See also ==
- Wheel arrangement
