= GWR Firefly Class =

Class of British steam locomotives

Fire Fly
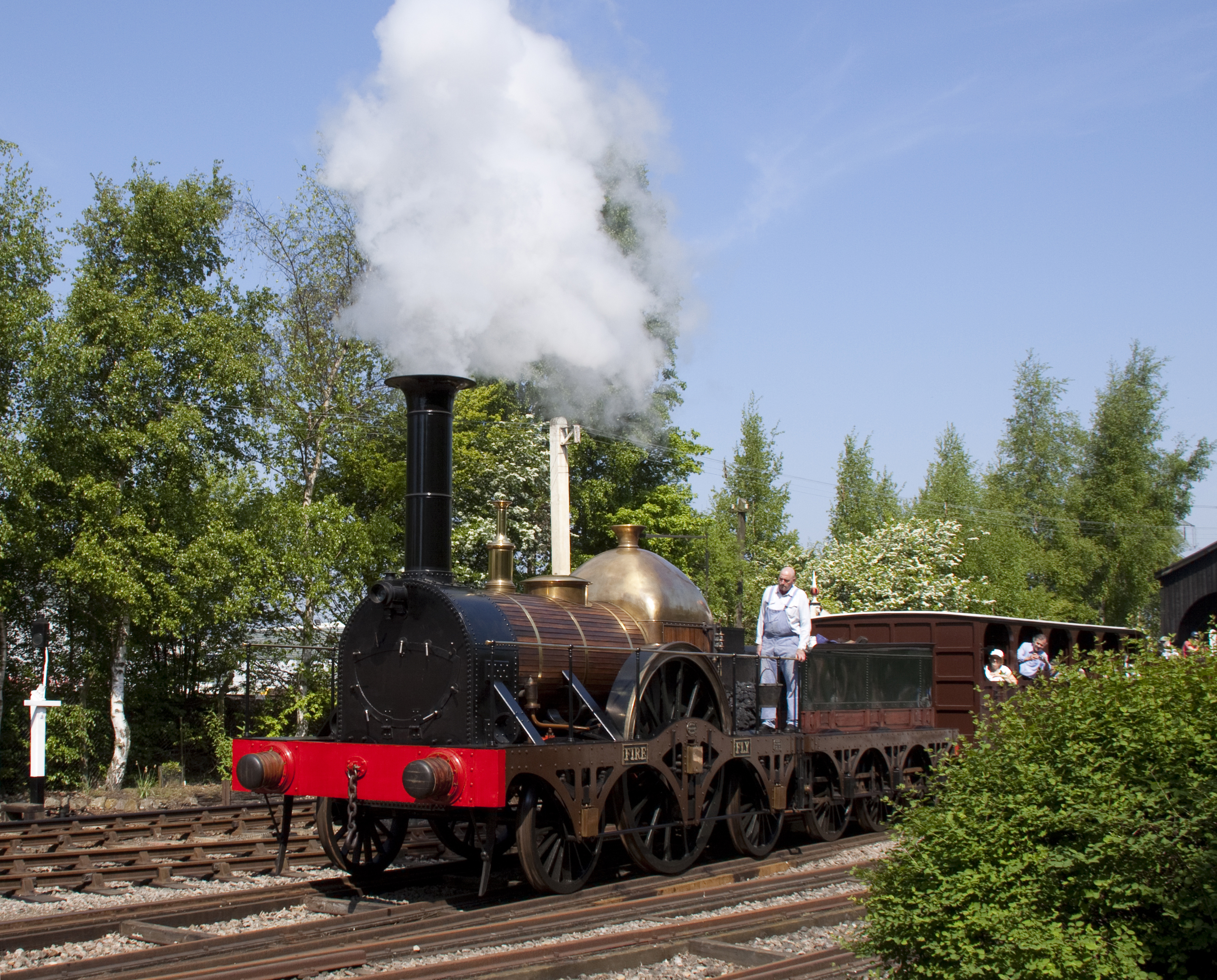
- Replica of the Great Western Railway Gooch 7 foot gauge "Priam" Class, or “Firefly” Class 2-2-2 "Fire Fly”.
Type and origin
- Power type: Steam
- Designer: Daniel Gooch
- Builder: Jones, Turner and Evans (6); Sharp, Roberts and Company (10); Fenton, Murray and Jackson (20); G. and J. Rennie (2); R. B. Longridge and Company (6); Stothert, Slaughter and Company (2); Nasmyth, Gaskell and Company (16)
- Build date: 1840–1842
- Total produced: 62
Specifications
- Configuration
  - Whyte: 2-2-2
- Gauge: 7 ft 1/4 in (2,140 mm)
- Leading dia.: 4 ft 0 in (1.219 m)
- Driver dia.: 7 ft 0 in (2.134 m)
- Trailing dia.: 4 ft 0 in (1.219 m)
- Wheelbase: 13 ft 2 in (4.013 m)
- Cylinder size: 15 in × 18 in (381 mm × 457 mm) (bore x stroke); 16 in × 20 in (406 mm × 508 mm) (later)
Career
- Operators: Great Western Railway
- Class: Fire Fly, or Priam
- Disposition: Original 62 withdrawn and scrapped, new replica built in 2005

The Firefly was a class of broad gauge 2-2-2 steam locomotives used for passenger services on the Great Western Railway. The class was introduced into service between March 1840 and December 1842, and withdrawn between December 1863 and July 1879.

Following the success of the Star class locomotives introduced to the Great Western Railway by Daniel Gooch, Gooch set to work to develop a new class based on North Star, but with larger boilers. The result was the Fire Fly, later followed by 61 similar locomotives designated the same class.

From about 1865, the Fire Fly Class locomotives became part of the Priam Class, along with the Prince Class locomotives.

The original Fire Fly is said to have covered the 30.75 miles (49.49 km) from Twyford to London Paddington in 37 minutes, an average speed of 50 miles per hour (80 km/h), which was unprecedented in 1840.

== Locomotives ==
=== A to D ===
Acheron
1842–1866. Built by Fenton, Murray and Jackson. The name Acheron comes from a Greek river and was later carried by a Hawthorn class locomotive.
Achilles
1841–1867. Built by Nasmyth, Gaskell and Company. The name is that of a Greek mythological warrior. See Achilles.
Actaeon
1841–1868. Built by Nasmyth, Gaskell and Company, the name is that of a hero from Greek mythology. See Actaeon.
Arab
1841–1870. Built by G and J Rennie. An Arab is a member of an ethnic group found mainly in the Middle East and Africa.
Argus
1842–1873. Built by Fenton, Murray and Jackson. Argus was the builder of the Argo, a ship in Greek mythology.
Arrow
1841–1864. Built by Stothert and Slaughter. An arrow is a pointed projectile weapon.
Bellona
1841–1870. Built by Nasmyth, Gaskell and Company. Bellona was a Roman goddess.
Castor
1841–1874. Built by Nasmyth, Gaskell and Company. Castor was the twin of Pollux in Greek mythology.
Centaur
1841–1867. Built by Nasmyth, Gaskell and Company. A centaur is a Greek mythological creature, half human and half horse.
Cerberus
1841–1866. Built by Fenton, Murray and Jackson. Cerberus was a character in Greek mythology and the name was later carried by a Hawthorn class locomotive.
Charon
1840–1878. Built by Fenton, Murray and Jackson. In Greek mythology, Charon was the ferryman who carried the dead in his boat.
Cyclops
1840–1865. Built by Fenton, Murray and Jackson. The Cyclopes were one-eyed figures in Greek mythology.
Damon
1842–1870. Built by Nasmyth, Gaskell and Company. Damon was a follower of the Greek philosopher, Pythagoras.
Dart
1841–1870. Built by Stothert and Slaughter. A dart is a projectile weapon.

=== E to H ===
Electra
1842–1867. Built by Nasmyth, Gaskell and Company. In Greek mythology, Electra was daughter of Agamemnon and Clytemnestra.
Erebus
1842–1873. Built by Fenton, Murray and Jackson. Erebus was the son of the primordial Greek god, Chaos.
Falcon
1840–1867. Built by Sharp, Roberts and Company. A falcon is a kind of bird of prey.
Fire Ball
1840–1866. Built by Jones, Turner and Evans with a 13-foot-4-inch (4.06 m) wheelbase, Fire Ball hauled the first train from Temple Meads to Bath on 31 August 1840, and from Temple Meads to Bridgwater on 14 June 1841. It was rebuilt c.1849 as a saddle tank locomotive. This was one of six Fire Fly class locomotives named with a fire theme - the term fire ball refers to an explosion of fire.
Fire Brand
1840–1866. Built by Jones, Turner and Evans with a 13-foot-4-inch (4.06 m) wheelbase. A firebrand is a piece of burning wood, but also used to denote a person with a fiery temperament.
Fire Fly
1840–1870. Built by Jones, Turner and Evans with a 13-foot-4-inch (4.06 m) wheelbase. A firefly is a luminous beetle.
Fire King
1840–1875. This locomotive crashed in front of Isambard Kingdom Brunel on 25 October 1840, the first recorded accident on the railway. The driver and a guard were killed when Fire King and its goods train failed to stop at the temporary terminus at Faringdon Road. It had been built by Jones, Turner and Evans with a 13-foot-4-inch (4.06 m) wheelbase, and was rebuilt circa 1849 as a saddle tank locomotive.
Ganymede
1842–1878. Built by Fenton, Murray and Jackson. Ganymede was a hero in Greek mythology.
Gorgon
1841–1878. Built by Fenton, Murray and Jackson. The Gorgon was a Greek mythological monster with hair of living snakes.
Greyhound
1841–1866. Built by Sharp, Roberts and Company. A greyhound is a kind of dog bred for its speed.
Harpy
1841–1873. Built by Fenton, Murray and Jackson. A harpy was a Greek mythological winged spirit.
Hawk
1840–1865. Built by Sharp, Roberts and Company. A hawk is a kind of bird of prey; the name was later carried by a Hawthorn class locomotive.
Hecate
1841–1867. Built by Fenton, Murray and Jackson. Hecate was a Greek goddess of childbirth.
Hector
1841–1866. Built by Nasmyth, Gaskell and Company. Hector was a Greek hero in the Trojan War.
Hydra
1842–1865. Built by Fenton, Murray and Jackson. The Hydra was a many-headed serpent in Greek mythology.

=== I to N ===
Ixion
1841–1879. Built by Fenton, Murray and Jackson, this was the locomotive that represented the broad gauge at the Gauge Commission trials of 1845, achieving a maximum of 61 miles per hour (98 km/h). Ixion was a king in Greek mythology.
Jupiter
1841–1867. Built by R. B. Longridge and Company. This locomotive was named after Jupiter, a senior Roman god.
Leopard
1840–1878. Built by Sharp, Roberts and Company. A leopard is a large member of the cat family.
Lethe
1842–1878. Built by Fenton, Murray and Jackson. Lethe is one of the rivers in Hades, the Greek underworld, and drinking its waters caused forgetfulness.
Lucifer
1841–1870. Built by R B Longridge and Company. Lucifer was the poetic Roman name for the morning star.
Lynx
1840–1870. Built by Sharp, Roberts and Company. A lynx is a kind of wild cat.
Mars
1841–1868. Built by R B Longridge and Company. This locomotive was named after Mars, the Roman god of war.
Mazeppa
1841–1868. Built by G and J Rennie. Mazeppa was a popular Victorian heroic poem.
Medea
1842–1873. Built by Fenton, Murray and Jackson. Medea was a princess in Greek mythology.
Medusa
1842–1864. Built by Fenton, Murray and Jackson. Medusa was a Greek mythological monster whose look could turn a person to stone.
Mentor
1841–1867. Built by Nasmyth, Gaskell and Company. The original mentor was a friend of Odysseus who featured in Greek mythology.
Mercury
1841–1865. Built by R B Longridge and Company. This locomotive was named after Mercury, a Roman god.
Milo
1841–1866. Built by Nasmyth, Gaskell and Company. This locomotive was probably named after Titus Annius Milo, a Roman politician.
Minos
1841–1870. Built by Fenton, Murray and Jackson. Minos was a king of Crete featured in Greek mythology.

=== N to W ===
Orion
1842–1867. Built by Nasmyth, Gaskell and Company. Rebuilt as a 4-2-2ST saddle tank locomotive. This locomotive was probably named after Orion of Thebes, a Grecian scholar.
Ostrich
1840–1865. Built by Sharp, Roberts and Company. An ostrich is a large flightless bird; the name was later carried by a Hawthorn class locomotive.
Panther
1840–1869. Built by Sharp, Roberts and Company. A panther is a big cat and appears in Greek mythology as an animal that carried gods.
Pegasus
1842–1868. Built by Nasmyth, Gaskell and Company. Pegasus was the winged horse of Greek mythology.
Phlegethon
1842–1866. Built by Fenton, Murray and Jackson, this locomotive had the privilege of powering Queen Victoria's first railway journey on 13 June 1842. Phlegethon was one of the five rivers of the Greek underworld. The name was later carried by a Hawthorn class locomotive.
Phoenix
1842–1870. Built by Nasmyth, Gaskell and Company. The phoenix was a Greek mythological bird that is reborn from the ashes of its fiery death.
Pluto
1841–1870. Built by Fenton, Murray and Jackson. This locomotive was named after Pluto, the Roman god of the underworld.
Pollux
1842–1866. Built by Nasmyth, Gaskell and Company. Pollux was the twin of Castor in Greek mythology; the name was later transferred to a Hawthorn class locomotive.
Priam
1842–1864. Built by Nasmyth, Gaskell and Company. Priam was the king of Troy during the Trojan War.
Proserpine
1842–1873. Built by Fenton, Murray and Jackson. Proserpine was the goddess of the Greek underworld.
Saturn
1841–1878. Built by R B Longridge and Company. This locomotive is named after Saturn, the Roman god of the harvest.
Spit Fire
1840–1878. Built by Jones, Turner and Evans with a 13-foot-4-inch (4.06 m) wheelbase.
Stag
1840–1870. Built by Sharp, Roberts and Company. A stag is a male deer.
Stentor
1842–1867. Built by Nasmyth, Gaskell and Company. Stentor was a herald in the Trojan War.
Tiger
1840–1873. Built by Sharp, Roberts and Company, it derailed near Chippenham on 7 September 1841 due to an earthslip, although Rising Star, which was coupled in front, ran over the damaged track without mishap. A tiger is a big cat.
Venus
1841–1870. Built by R B Longridge and Company. This locomotive was named after Venus, the Roman goddess of love.
Vesta
1841–1864. Built by Fenton, Murray and Jackson. Vesta was the Roman goddess of the home.
Vulture
1840–1870. Built by Sharp, Roberts and Company. A vulture is a large scavenging bird.
Wild Fire
1840–1867. Built by Jones, Turner and Evans with a 13-foot-4-inch (4.06 m) wheelbase. One of six Firefly Class locomotives named with a fire theme; a wildfire is another name for a forest fire.

== Accidents and incidents ==
- On 25 November 1852, Lynx was hauling a passenger train which was derailed at Gatcombe, Gloucestershire.

== Replica ==
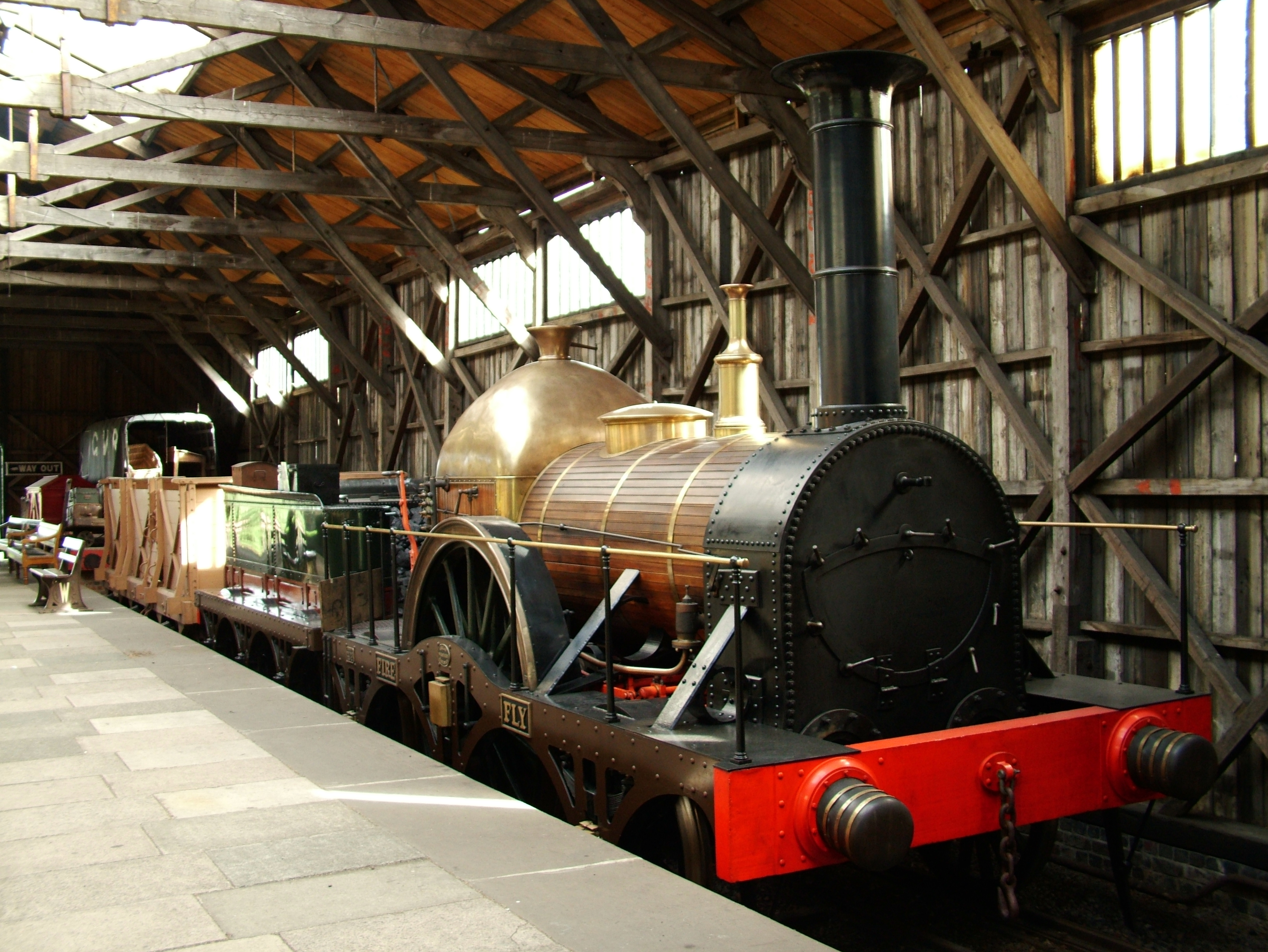
GWR Firefly replica at Didcot Railway Centre

- Firefly (2005)

A 63rd member of the Fire Fly class was unveiled to the public in 2005. It is a working replica of the original Fire Fly and is based at Didcot Railway Centre.

== In literature ==
- A silver model of a Firefly Class locomotive provides a plotline in the novel "The Silver Locomotive Mystery" by Edward Marston, published 2009.
