= KkStB 112 =

kkStB 112 BBÖ 112 DRB Class 69.01
Type and origin
- Builder: Krauß/Linz
- Build date: 1907
- Total produced: 2
Specifications
- Configuration
  - Whyte: 2-2-2T
- Gauge: 1,435 mm (4 ft 8 1/2 in)
- Leading dia.: 870 mm (34 1/4 in)
- Driver dia.: 1,450 mm (57 1/8 in)
- Trailing dia.: 870 mm (34 1/4 in)
- Wheelbase
  - Overall: 5,050 mm (16 ft 6 3/4 in)
- Length: 7,550 mm (24 ft 9 1/4 in)
- Height: 4,558 mm (14 ft 11 1/2 in)
- Adhesive weight: 14.3 t (14.1 long tons; 15.8 short tons)
- Service weight: 31.6 t (31.1 long tons; 34.8 short tons)
- Fuel capacity: 1.36 t (1.34 long tons; 1.50 short tons) of coal
- Water cap.: 3.0 m^{3} (660 imp gal; 790 US gal)
- Boiler
- No. of heating tubes: 128
- Heating tube length: 2,500 mm (8 ft 2 1/2 in)
- Boiler pressure: 15 kgf/cm^{2} (1,470 kPa; 213 lbf/in^{2})
- Heating surface
  - Firebox: 1.03 m^{2} (11.1 sq ft)
  - Radiative: 5.20 m^{2} (56.0 sq ft)
  - Tubes: 39.60 m^{2} (426.3 sq ft)
- Cylinders: 2
- High-pressure cylinder: 260 mm (10 1/4 in)
- Low-pressure cylinder: 400 mm (15 3/4 in)
- Piston stroke: 550 mm (21 5/8 in)
Performance figures
- Maximum speed: 75 km/h (47 mph)
Career
- Numbers: kkStB: 112.01–112.02; BBÖ: 112.01–112.02; DRB: 69 011
- Retired: 1937, 1942

The kkStB 112 was a class of express train 2-2-2 tank engine operated by the Imperial Royal Austrian State Railways (German: kaiserlich-königliche österreichische Staatsbahnen or kkStB).

In order for the kkStB to provide a fast feeder service to express train stations, a requirement arose for small, fast locomotives. Karl Gölsdorf designed Class 112 for this purpose. The compound locomotives were well built, enabled a top speed of 100 km/h (62 mph) to be attained for short periods of time and could haul 100 tonnes continuously at 80 km/h (50 mph). On their delivery by Krauß to Linz in 1907 the two engines were fitted with a small smokebox superheater, that was later removed.

The small locomotives were initially used to haul newspaper trains between Vienna and Linz. Later they hauled the shuttle (Pendler) between Hütteldorf and Unterpurkersdorf, a connecting line to the Vienna Stadtbahn, where they were marshalled in the centre of the train.

Number 112.02 was retired in 1937, whilst 112.01 went into the Deutsche Reichsbahn as number 69 011 where it was withdrawn from service in 1942.

== See also ==
- Deutsche Reichsbahn
- List of DRG locomotives and railbuses
