= List of South Devon Railway locomotives =

Locomotive classes used by the broad gauge South Devon Railway, later amalgamated with the Great Western Railway. (Note: This article uses the class groups and names from Sheppard (2008), as the most recent and most authoritative study.)

Class	code (Note: Broad Gauge Society class code)	Wheel arrangement	Builder	Driving wheels	Cylinders	Introduced	Withdrawn	Number built	Names
Comet	D41	4-4-0ST		5 ft 9 in	17 in × 24 in	1851	1884	12	Comet, Lance, Rocket, Meteor, Priam, Aurora, Damon, Ostrich, Falcon, Orion, Ixion, Osiris
Antelope	D42	4-4-0ST	Slaughter, Grüning & Co.	5 ft 6 in	16½ in × 24 in	1859	1892	15	Hawk, Eagle, Elk, Lynx, Gazelle, Mazeppa, Giraffe, Lion, Antelope, Wolf, Tiger, Hector, Cato, Dart, Pollux, Castor
Zebra	D43	4-4-0ST	Avonside Engine Co.	5 ft 8 in	17 in × 24 in	1866	1892	6	Sedley, Gorgon, Titan, Pluto, Zebra, Sol
Stag	D44	4-4-0ST	Avonside Engine Co.	5 ft 9 in	17 in × 24 in	1872	1892	4	Leopard, Stag, Lance, Osiris
Heron	D46	4-4-0ST	South Devon Railway	5 ft 3 in	17 in × 24 in	1872	1892	2	Heron, Magpie
King	D47	2-4-0T	Avonside Engine Co.	3 ft	9 in × 16 in	1871	1878	1	King
Prince	D48	2-4-0ST	South Devon Railway	4 ft	12 in × 17 in	1871	1892	1 (Note: Prince was completed by the SDR, but the others were still under construction when the SDR amalgamated with the GWR)	Prince, Saturn, Jupiter, Mercury
Penwith	D49	2-4-0ST	Stothert & Slaughter	5 ft	15 in × 22 in	1872	1888	1	Penwith
Tiny	D50	0-4-0VBT	Sara and Co.	3 ft	9 in × 12 in	1872	1888 (Note: Tiny is one of the few surviving broad gauge locomotives)	1	Tiny
Weasel	D51	0-4-0WT	Avonside Engine Co.	3 ft	11 in × 16 in	1873	1893	3	Owl, Goat, Weasel
Raven	D52	0-4-0ST	Avonside Engine Co.	3 ft	14 in × 18 in	1874	1892	5	Raven, Rook, Lark, Crow, Jay
Tornado	D61	0-6-0ST	Vulcan Foundry	4 ft 9 in	17 in × 24 in	1854	1885	4	Volcano, Tornado, Sampson, Goliath
Ada	D62	0-6-0ST	Slaughter, Grüning & Co.	4 ft 6 in	16½ in × 24 in	1860	1887	5 (Note: Two other locomotives built for the Llynvi Valley Railway)	Dido, Hero, Rosa
Romulus	D63	0-6-0ST	Slaughter, Grüning & Co.	4 ft 9 in	17 in × 24 in	1860	1892	8 (Note: The classification of some of these locomotives is questioned, as to whether they were the 4 ft 6 in wheeled Ada class, or the 4'9" wheeled Romulus class. See Dido class)	Hebe, Ajax, Brutus, Argo, Atlas, Juno, Romulus, Remus
Taurus	D64	0-6-0ST	Avonside Engine Co.	3 ft	12½ in × 16 in	1869	1892	1	Taurus
Camel	D65	0-6-0ST	Avonside Engine Co.	4 ft 9 in	17 in × 24 in	1872	1892	10	Buffalo, Elephant, Camel, Hercules, Dragon, Achilles, Dromedary, Emperor, Python, Vulcan
Redruth	D66	0-6-0ST		4 ft 9 in	17 in × 24 in	1871	1887	1	Redruth
GWR Sir Watkin class	A63	0-6-0ST	GWR	4 ft 6 in	17 in × 24 in	1872	1892	1 (Note: This was a class of six, built by the GWR as side tanks. Three were sold in 1872 to the South Devon and the Cornwall Railways (Bulkeley & Fowler). They returned to the GWR on amalgamation in 1876. All six were rebuilt as saddle tanks after 1883)	Saunders
GWR 'Banking' class	A61	0-6-0ST	GWR	5 ft	17 in × 24 in	1872	1889	1 (Note: A class of five, built by the GWR in 1852. Juno was sold to the South Devon in 1872)	Stromboli (Note: Previously named Juno, but renamed to avoid confusion with the Romulus class locomotive)
