= South Devon Railway locomotives =

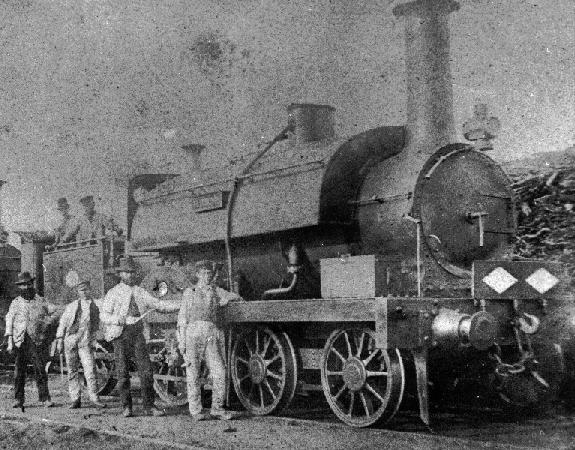
4-4-0ST Heron as rebuilt in 1872

South Devon Railway locomotives were broad gauge locomotives that operated over the South Devon Railway, Cornwall Railway, and West Cornwall Railway in England. They were, at times, operated by contractors on behalf of the railways.

== Operators ==
=== 1846 Great Western Railway ===
The South Devon Railway was designed by Isambard Kingdom Brunel to be operated by atmospheric power, but this was not a success and so the Great Western Railway provided steam locomotives when the railway first opened. Two High Foundry locomotives were specially named for working on the line, Snake and Viper became Exe and Teign during their sojourn in Devon.

Other locomotives were used including members of the Fire Fly, Leo, and Sun classes, and also Hercules class goods locomotives.

Two tank locomotives, Corsair and Brigand were specially designed by Daniel Gooch with innovative bogies to cope with the sharp curves on the railway. These were known as the Bogie class.

=== 1851 Evans and Geach ===
Brunel selected Edward Evans and Charles Geach to supply and operate a new fleet of tank locomotives designed by Gooch. These were supplied by Evans' Haigh Foundry and other builders. Payments were made for working the trains and interest, and various excess charges could also be raised for extra workings. The railway provided engine sheds and were allowed to buy the locomotives at the end of the ten-year contract, which started on 3 June 1851.

=== 1859 Evans, Walker and Gooch ===
A new seven-year contract took effect from 1 July 1859, now signed by Edward Evans, Thomas Walker and Daniel Gooch. The terms were considered to be more beneficial to the railway. The locomotive fleet grew to allow the South Devon Railway to operate a number of independent branches: the South Devon and Tavistock Railway (1859), Dartmouth and Torbay Railway (1859), and the Launceston and South Devon Railway (1865).

A separate contract was signed with the same contractors to provide locomotives to the Cornwall Railway, which had opened on 4 May 1859.

=== 1866 South Devon Railway ===
The South Devon Railway bought the locomotives when the contract ended on 1 July 1866 and took over their operation. The Cornwall Railway locomotives were also sold to the South Devon Railway, and further locomotives were provided for the West Cornwall Railway. The locomotives were operated as a common fleet throughout the three railways, but the locomotives were separately accounted for by each railway.

The number of lines operated increased further with the opening of the Moretonhampstead and South Devon Railway (1866), and the Buckfastleigh, Totnes and South Devon Railway (1871). The Lostwithiel and Fowey Railway was also provided with locomotives for a short time when it opened in 1869.

=== 1876 Great Western Railway ===
The South Devon Railway was amalgamated into the Great Western Railway on 1 February 1876 and so the whole locomotive fleet was transferred, including those on the Cornwall and West Cornwall railways. They were allocated numbers 2096 to 2179. As the older locomotives were withdrawn they were replaced by more modern locomotives but those for the Cornish fleets continued to be separately accounted for.

The new owners enabled some changes in operation to happen, notably the operation of tender locomotives west of Exeter, such as the well-known Rovers.

== Locomotive sheds ==
The main locomotive workshops were established at Newton Abbot, initially under W. F. Gooch, Daniel's brother, but from 1864 the superintendent was John Wright. Other depots were situated at:

- Carn Brea
- Exeter
- Falmouth
- Kingswear
- Launceston
- Penzance
- Plymouth
- St Ives
- Tavistock
- Totnes
- Truro

Equipment was provided for some heavier repairs on the Cornwall Railway at Truro and was moved to Falmouth when the line was extended to that town. The West Cornwall Railway had established workshops at Carn Brea which were transferred to the South Devon Railway with their locomotives.

== Locomotive types ==
- 1851 Comet class – twelve 4-4-0STs
- 1854 Tornado class – four 0-6-0STs
- 1859 Eagle class – sixteen 4-4-0STs
- 1860 Dido class – eight 0-6-0STs
- 1866 Gorgon class – six 4-4-0STs
- 1866 Remus class – two 0-6-0STs
- 1868 Tiny – a small 0-4-0VB
- 1868 ex-Llynvi Valley Railway – three 0-6-0STs
- 1868 Etna – a secondhand 4-4-0ST
- 1869 Taurus – a small 0-6-0ST
- 1871 King – a small 2-4-0T
- 1871 Prince – a small 2-4-0ST
- 1871 Redruth – a West Cornwall Railway 0-6-0ST rebuilt to broad gauge
- 1872 Penwith – a West Cornwall Railway rebuilt 2-4-0ST
- 1872 Buffalo class – ten convertible 0-6-0STs
- 1872 ex-Great Western Railway Sir Watkin class – three secondhand 0-6-0STs
- 1872 Great Western Railway Banking class – a secondhand 0-6-0ST
- 1872 ex-Carmarthen and Cardigan Railway – three secondhand 4-4-0STs
- 1872 Leopard class – four convertible 4-4-0STs
- 1873 Owl class – three small convertible 0-4-0WTs
- 1874 Raven class – five convertible 0-4-0STs
- 1876 Prince class – three 2-4-0STs not completed

== Alphabetical list of locomotives ==
=== A to E ===
- Achilles Buffalo class 0-6-0ST (SDR)
- Ada ex-Llynvi Valley Railway 0-6-0ST (WCR)
- Ajax Dido class 0-6-0ST (SDR)
- Antelope Eagle class 4-4-0ST (SDR)

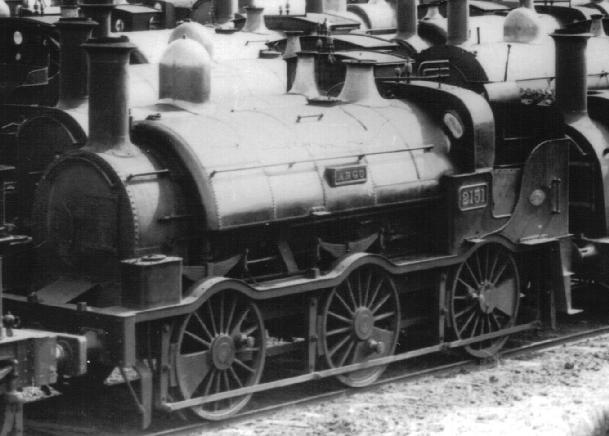
Argo

- Argo Dido class 0-6-0ST (CR)
- Atlas Dido class 0-6-0ST (CR)
- Aurora Comet class 4-4-0ST (SDR)
- Brutus Dido class 0-6-0ST (SDR)
- Buffalo Buffalo class 0-6-0ST (SDR)
- Bukeley ex-Great Western Railway Sir Watkin class 0-6-0ST (CR)
- Camel Buffalo class 0-6-0ST (SDR)
- Castor Eagle class 4-4-0ST (CR)
- Cato Eagle class 4-4-0ST (CR)
- Comet Comet class 4-4-0ST (SDR)
- Crow Raven class 0-4-0ST (SDR)
- Damon Comet class 4-4-0ST (SDR)
- Dart Eagle class 4-4-0ST (SDR)
- Dido Dido class 0-6-0ST (CR)
- Dragon Buffalo class 0-6-0ST (CR)
- Dromedary Buffalo class 0-6-0ST (SDR)
- Eagle Eagle class 4-4-0ST (CR)
- Elephant Buffalo class 0-6-0ST (SDR)
- Elk Eagle class 4-4-0ST (CR)
- Emperor Buffalo class 0-6-0ST (CR)
- Etna ex-Carmarthen and Cardigan Railway 4-4-0ST (SDR)

=== F to K ===
- Falcon Comet class 4-4-0ST (SDR)
- Fowler ex-Great Western Railway Sir Watkin class 0-6-0ST (CR)
- Gazelle Eagle class 4-4-0ST (CR)
- Giraffe Eagle class 4-4-0ST (SDR)
- Goat Owl class 0-4-0WT (SDR)
- Goliah Tornado class 0-6-0ST (SDR)
- Gorgon Gorgon class 4-4-0ST (SDR)
- Hawk Eagle class 4-4-0ST (SDR)
- Hebe Dido class 0-6-0ST (SDR)
- Hecla ex-Carmarthen and Cardigan Railway 4-4-0ST (SDR)
- Hector Eagle class 4-4-0ST (SDR)
- Hercules Buffalo class 0-6-0ST (CR)
- Hero Dido class 0-6-0ST (CR)

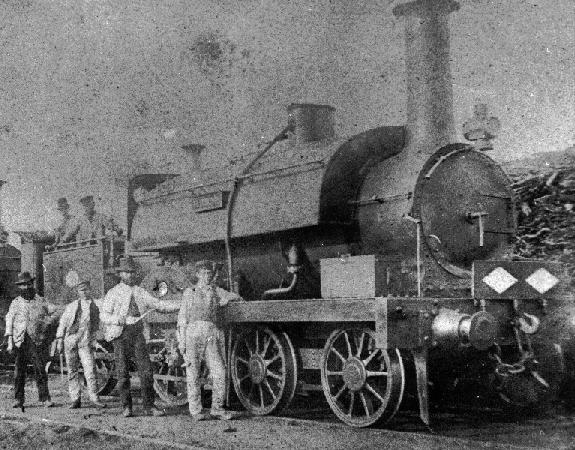
Heron

- Heron ex-Carmarthen and Cardigan Railway 4-4-0ST (SDR)
- Ixion Comet class 4-4-0ST (SDR)
- Jay Raven class 0-4-0ST (SDR)
- Juno Dido class 0-6-0ST (SDR)
- Jupiter Prince class 2-4-0ST
- King Avonside Engine Company 2-4-0T (SDR)

=== L to P ===
- Lance (1851) Comet class 4-4-0ST (SDR)
- Lance (1875) Leopard class 4-4-0ST (SDR)
- Lark Raven class 0-4-0ST (SDR)
- Leopard Leopard class 4-4-0ST (SDR)
- Lion Eagle class 4-4-0ST (SDR)
- Lynx Eagle class 4-4-0ST (CR)
- Magpie ex-Carmarthen and Cardigan Railway 4-4-0ST (CR)
- Mazeppa Eagle class 4-4-0ST (CR)
- Mercury Prince class 2-4-0ST
- Meteor Comet class 4-4-0ST (SDR)
- Orion Comet class 4-4-0ST (SDR)
- Osiris (1853) Comet class 4-4-0ST (SDR)
- Osiris (1875) Leopard class 4-4-0ST (SDR)
- Ostrich Comet class 4-4-0ST (SDR)
- Owl Owl class 0-4-0WT (SDR)
- Penwith 2-4-0ST (WCR)
- Pluto Gorgon class 4-4-0ST (WCR)
- Pollux Eagle class 4-4-0ST (CR)
- Priam Comet class 4-4-0ST (SDR)
- Prince 2-4-0ST (SDR)
- Python Buffalo class 0-6-0ST (SDR)

=== R to Z ===
- Raven Raven class 0-4-0ST (SDR)
- Redruth 0-6-0ST (WCR)
- Remus Remus class 0-6-0ST (WCR)
- Rocket Comet class 4-4-0ST (SDR)
- Romulus Remus class 0-6-0ST (WCR)
- Rook Raven class 0-4-0ST (SDR)
- Rosa ex-Llynvi Valley Railway 0-6-0ST (WCR)
- Sampson Tornado class 0-6-0ST (SDR)
- Saturn Prince class 2-4-0ST
- Saunders ex-Great Western Railway Sir Watkin class 0-6-0ST (SDR)
- Sedley Gorgon class 4-4-0ST (SDR)
- Sol Gorgon class 4-4-0ST (SDR)
- Stag Leopard class 4-4-0ST (SDR)
- Stromboli ex-Great Western Railway Banking class 0-6-0ST (SDR)
- Taurus Avonside Engine Company 0-6-0ST (SDR)
- Tiger Eagle class 4-4-0ST (SDR)
- Tiny Sara and Company 0-4-0vb (SDR)
- Titan Gorgon class 4-4-0ST (WCR)
- Tornado Tornado class 0-6-0ST (SDR)
- Una ex-Llynvi Valley Railway 0-6-0ST (WCR)
- Volcano Tornado class 0-6-0ST (SDR)
- Vulcan Buffalo class 0-6-0ST (CR)
- Weasel Owl class 0-4-0WT (SDR)
- Wolf Eagle class 4-4-0ST (CR)
- Zebra Gorgon class 4-4-0ST (WCR)
