= South Devon Railway Gorgon class =

Gorgon
Type and origin
- Power type: Steam
- Designer: Daniel Gooch
- Builder: Avonside Engine Co.
Specifications
- Configuration
  - Whyte: 4-4-0ST
- Gauge: 7 ft 1/4 in (2,140 mm)
- Leading dia.: 3 ft 4 in (1.02 m)
- Driver dia.: 5 ft 8 in (1.73 m)
- Wheelbase: 18 ft 3 1/2 in (5.575 m)
- Cylinder size: 17 in × 24 in (430 mm × 610 mm)
Career
- Operators: South Devon Railway
- Class: Gorgon

The Gorgon class were six 4-4-0ST broad gauge locomotives operated on the South Devon Railway, Cornwall Railway and West Cornwall Railway. They were designed for passenger trains on this steep and sharply curved line but were also used on goods trains when required.

They were ordered by the South Devon Railway which was contracted to operate the locomotives for both the railways. They were designed by Daniel Gooch a development of his earlier Comet class, and built by the Avonside Engine Company.

The locomotives of the three railways were operated as a combined fleet by the South Devon Railway but each was accounted to the railway that ordered it. On 1 February 1876, the South Devon Railway was amalgamated with the Great Western Railway, the locomotives were given numbers by their new owners but continued to carry their names too.

== Locomotives ==
=== South Devon Railway ===
- Gorgon (1866 – 1892) GWR no. 2122
  On a foggy Christmas Day in 1883, Gorgon was put on the front of a train at Newton Abbot railway station to assist it over the heavy gradients to the west. After leaving the station the driver realised that he did not have the train behind him. The driver slowed down, only for the remainder of the train to emerge from the fog and collide with his locomotive. Gorgon was named after a Greek mythological monster, the Gorgon.
- Sedley (1866 – 1885) GWR no. 2124
  Sedley was the first broad gauge locomotive to take a passenger train through to Penzance when the West Cornwall Railway was converted to mixed gauge. The derivation of this name is uncertain.
- Sol (1866 – 1892) GWR no. 2125
  The word Sol is the Sun in Latin.

=== West Cornwall Railway ===
- Pluto (1866 – 1892) GWR no. 2123
  Pluto is believed to have been one of the two locomotives on the last passenger train from Penzance on 20 May 1892 before the broad gauge was abandoned. Named after a Roman mythological character, Pluto.
- Titan (1866 – 1886) GWR no. 2126
  A titan is a powerful Greek god.
- Zebra (1866 – 1892) GWR no. 2127
  This locomotive was named after a fast animal, zebra.
