= South Devon Railway Eagle class =

Class of locomotive

Type and origin
- Power type: Steam
- Designer: Daniel Gooch
- Builder: Slaughter, Grüning and Company
- Serial number: 360–368, 411–412, 522, 559, 591–593
- Build date: 1859–1865
- Total produced: 16
Specifications
- Configuration
  - Whyte: 4-4-0ST
  - UIC: 2′B n2t
- Gauge: 7 ft 1/4 in (2,140 mm)
- Leading dia.: 3 ft 6 in (1.067 m)
- Driver dia.: 5 ft 6 in (1.676 m)
- Wheelbase: 18 ft 0 in (5.49 m)
- Water cap.: 1,100 imp gal (5,000 L; 1,300 US gal)
- Cylinder size: 16 1/2 in × 24 in (419 mm × 610 mm)
Career
- Operators: South Devon Railway; → Great Western Railway
- Class: Eagle
- Withdrawn: 1876–1892
- Disposition: All scrapped

The Eagle class were sixteen 4-4-0ST broad gauge locomotives operated on the South Devon Railway (SDR), Cornwall Railway (CR) and associated adjacent railways. They were designed for passenger trains on this steep and sharply curved line but were also used on goods trains when required.

They were ordered by Evans, Walker and Gooch who were contracted to operate the locomotives for both the railways. Daniel Gooch designed them as a development of his earlier Comet class. They had slightly smaller wheels but larger tanks containing 1,100 gallons, a 37.5% increase. They were built by Slaughter, Grüning and Company.

The locomotives were bought by the SDR on 1 July 1866 after which they were operated as a combined fleet over both the SDR and CR, but they continued to be accounted to their original owner. On 1 February 1876 the South Devon Railway was amalgamated with the Great Western Railway, the locomotives were given numbers by their new owners but continued to carry their names too.

== Locomotives ==
=== South Devon Railway ===
- Hawk (Slaughter, Grüning & Co. 591? of 1859); GWR no. 2108; withdrawn 1885

Named after the bird of prey, hawk.

- Giraffe (SG 365 of 1859); GWR no. 2112; withdrawn 1877

Giraffe hauled the first train on the Launceston and South Devon Railway on 1 June 1865 with Dart.
The locomotive was named after the animal, giraffe.

- Lion (SG 366 of 1859); GWR no. 2113; withdrawn 1883

Named after the powerful animal, lion.

- Antelope (SG 367 of 1859); GWR no. 2114; withdrawn 1884

Named after the swift animal, antelope.

- Tiger (SG 411 of 1860); GWR no. 2116; withdrawn 1884

Named after the powerful animal, tiger.

- Hector (SG 412 of 1860); GWR no. 2117; withdrawn 1892

Named after the Greek mythological character, Hector.

- Dart (SG 559 of 1863); GWR no. 2119; withdrawn 1885

Dart hauled the first train on the Launceston and South Devon Railway on 1 June 1865 with Giraffe.
The locomotive was named after the dart missile.

=== Cornwall Railway ===
- Eagle (SG 360 of 1859); GWR no. 2106; withdrawn 1876

Named after the bird of prey, eagle.

- Elk (SG 361 of 1859); GWR no. 2107; withdrawn 1877

Just two days after the opening of the railway Elk was derailed near St Germans and fell off Grove viaduct with fatal consequences.
The locomotive was named after the animal, elk.

- Lynx (SG 363 of 1859); GWR no. 2109; withdrawn 1876

Named after the strong animal, lynx.

- Gazelle (SG 364 of 1859); GWR no. 2110; withdrawn 1865

Named after the swift animal, gazelle.

- Mazeppa (SG 362 of 1859); GWR no. 2111; withdrawn 1885

Named after an epic poem, Mazeppa by Lord Byron.

- Wolf (SG 368 of 1859); GWR no. 2115; withdrawn 1878

Named after the strong animal, wolf.

- Cato (SG 522 of 1863); GWR no. 2118; withdrawn 1877

Cato was a name shared by many famous Romans.

- Pollux (SG 592 of 1865); GWR no. 2120; withdrawn 1892

Named after the Greek mythological character, Pollux, it had originally been intended to be named Tamar after the River Tamar.

- Castor (SG 593 of 1865) GWR no. 2121; withdrawn 1882

Named after the Greek mythological character' Castor, it had originally intended to be named Fal after the River Fal.
