= Llynvi and Ogmore Railway =

Former railway in Wales, United Kingdom

Overview
- Headquarters: Tondu
- Locale: Wales
- Dates of operation: 1861–1873
- Successor: Great Western Railway

Technical
- Track gauge: 4 ft 8 1/2 in (1,435 mm) and 7 ft 1/4 in (2,140 mm) Brunel gauge
- Length: 27 miles (43 km)

In 1861 the Llynvi Valley Railway was opened in Glamorganshire, Wales, to convey mineral products to the Bristol Channel at Porthcawl. It adopted an earlier tramroad, the Duffryn Llynvi and Porthcawl Railway. The Llynvi and Ogmore Railway (L&OR) was opened in 1865, and the two companies amalgamated to form the Llynvi and Ogmore Railway in 1866. At first Porthcawl harbour was an important destination for onward transport, but this soon declined.

The area covered by the two lines combined developed considerably serving collieries and the iron and zinc smelting industries, and the L&OR system was extremely busy in conveying minerals up until 1914. A number of extensions to the system were made, even after takeover by the Great Western Railway in 1873 for management purposes and in 1883 as full amalgamation.

Passengers were carried on parts of the network, but were never dominant except at Porthcawl, which declined as a harbour and arose as a holiday and residential location. As the mineral industries declined after 1945 the railway network followed, but in 1992 the line from Bridgend to Maesteg was reopened to passenger trains, and that is the principal remaining railway activity on the old L&OR network.

== Industry before the railway ==
The Llynfi Valley runs north to south, from the high mountains 3 miles (5 km) north of Maesteg down to Tondu where it joins the River Ogmore, which itself continues through Bridgend to the Bristol Channel at Ogmore-by-Sea.

In the first half of the eighteenth century the area was entirely rural, but coal outcropped in the ground and was used by farmers, and some was taken away for sale by pack animal. Charcoal had been used for smelting iron but in the second half of the 18th century, coke began to be used instead; limestone was available locally and was used in the process.

Cefn Cribwr had been the site of a blast furnace established by John Bedford in 1780, though that declined after Bedford's death in 1791. William Bryant took over the works in about 1825. Elsewhere though, the industry had been on a small scale. It was in 1826 that the Maesteg Iron Company was founded: the first furnace was blown in 1828 and by 1831 the population of the local hamlet had tripled (Cwmdu, from 968 to 2,880). The Maesteg Iron Company later became known as the Old Works and its foundation started the large scale industrialisation of the process locally.

This was followed in 1831 by the establishment by James Allen of the Spelter Works near what is now Caerau. Spelter is an ore of zinc; it was mined in Cornwall and brought to the area for smelting. The locality of the works became known as Spelter, and the name appears on present-day maps. In 1839 Allen and his partners established another iron company, the Cambrian Iron Works (later known as the Llynvi Iron Works), in Maesteg.

These industries needed transport away to market, and this was chiefly by sea from wharves on the Bristol Channel. Transport from the works and the collieries to the coast was expensive and slow, generally taking place on the backs of pack animals. The ordinary road network was quite inadequate for industrial development.

== Duffryn Llynvi and Porthcawl Railway ==
Duffryn Llynvi and Porthcawl Railway Act 1825
- Act of Parliament
- Parliament of the United Kingdom
- Long title: An Act for making and maintaining a Railway or Tram Road from or from near to a certain Place called Duffryn Llynvi, in the Parish of Llangonoyd, in the County of Glamorgan, to or near to a certain Bay called Pwll Cawl, otherwise Porth Cawl, in the Parish of Newton Nottage, in the same County; and for extending and improving the same Bay, by the Erection of a Pier and other suitable Works for that Purpose.
- Citation: 6 Geo. 4. c. civ

Dates
- Royal assent: 10 June 1825

Other legislation
- Amended by: Duffryn, Llynvi and Porthcawl Railway Act 1829

Text of statute as originally enacted

Even the earlier, small-scale iron and coal industries around Maesteg, and further south along the Cefn Cribwr ridge, created a demand for ship-borne transport to market. The Duffryn Llynvi and Porth Cawl Railway (DL&PR) was promoted by local people, including the Earl of Dunraven, Sir John Nicholl and Sir Digby Mackworth. They obtained an act of Parliament, the Duffryn Llynvi and Porthcawl Railway Act 1825 (6 Geo. 4. c. civ), on 10 June 1825 to make a horse-drawn toll railway from Duffryn Llynvi to Pwll Cawl (or Porthcawl, or Pwll-y-Cawl), and to improve the harbour there by the erection of a jetty, and charge harbour dues and wharfage. The engineer was John Hodgkinson.

As well as conveying mineral products down to Porthcawl for shipping transport away, it was to bring limestone (used for fluxing in iron making) up from Cornelly, and also to a certain extent timber for mine use. The line was to use stone-block sleepers and cast iron fish-bellied edge rails, and the track gauge was to be 4 ft 7 in (1,397 mm) and its length would be 17 miles (27 km). (Note: Dendy Marshall says on page 93 that this and the Bridgend Railway were plate railways, opened in 1834, "rather a late date for a plate-railway". Smith says the gauge was 4 ft 7 in (1,397 mm), as do Barrie and Baughan. Chapman, in Ely Valley says the gauge was 4 ft 6 3/4 in (1,391 mm). Barrie in The Porthcawl Branch says the line was "reputedly constructed to the unusual gauge of 4 ft 7 in, although that may have been a discrepancy in point of measurement.")

Duffryn, Llynvi and Porthcawl Railway Act 1829
- Act of Parliament
- Parliament of the United Kingdom
- Long title: An Act to alter, amend, and enlarge the Powers of an Act passed in the Sixth Year of the Reign of His present Majesty, for making and maintaining the Duffryn Llynvi and Porth Cavil Railway, and other Works connected therewith.
- Citation: 10 Geo. 4. c. xxxviii

Dates
- Royal assent: 14 May 1829

Other legislation
- Amends: Duffryn Llynvi and Porthcawl Railway Act 1825
- Repealed by: Llynvi Valley Railway Act 1855

Status: Repealed

Text of statute as originally enacted

Capital was £40,000 and this was all subscribed before the act was passed, but obtaining a mortgage loan proved much more difficult, and a further act of 14 May 1829, the Duffryn, Llynvi and Porthcawl Railway Act 1829 (10 Geo. 4. c. xxxviii), was required to elevate the priority of the mortgage payments in order to secure the loans.

Construction of the line only began in 1826, and the line from the Maesteg ironworks at Duffryn Llynvi to Porthcawl was opened on 22 June 1828.

Duffryn Llynvi was the name of the ironworks in Maesteg—the district was also known as Garnlwyd. Many other works and collieries were served intermediately by the new line. Duffryn Llynvi was reached in 1828 when the line opened; the line was extended to Allen's spelter works in 1831. The line was soon extended further to the Blaenllynfi Colliery, in present-day Caerau; the colliery was alongside what is now Caerau Road (and Railway Terrace).

There were already a number of tramroad connections to works in the Tondu and Maesteg area, and the opening of the line, giving easy access to the dock at Porthcawl, encouraged the establishment of further metal foundries and collieries, in many cases served by private tramroads in connection with the DL&PR and in other cases purely internal and private. In 1839 a new ironworks, known as the Cambrian Ironworks, was established by Allen and his partners established another iron company, the Cambrian Iron Works (later named the Llynvi Iron Works), and in 1846 the Forge was added to these works.

The journey time from Duffryn Llynvi to Porthcawl was just over six hours; the return journey, uphill, took eight hours. A regular time table was operated on the line, and the passing places were designated. Each train was pulled by a team of three horses. As a toll railway the line was open to private carriers who paid tolls for the use of the line; the company did not operate trains nor own wagons of their own.

However it was becoming apparent that the harbour improvements at Porthcawl were inadequate, not doing enough to shelter vessels there from the prevailing winds, and it tended to be used in summer only.

Duffryn Llynvi and Porth Cawl Railway Act 1840
- Act of Parliament
- Parliament of the United Kingdom
- Long title: An Act to enable the Duffryn Llynvi and Porth Cawl Railway Company to raise a further Sum of Money, and to amend the Acts relating to the said Railway and to the Bay of Porth Cawl in the County of Glamorgan.
- Citation: 3 & 4 Vict. c. lxx

Dates
- Royal assent: 19 June 1840

Other legislation
- Repealed by: Llynvi Valley Railway Act 1855

Status: Repealed

Text of statute as originally enacted

In 1840 a further act, the Duffryn Llynvi and Porth Cawl Railway Act 1840 (3 & 4 Vict. c. lxx), was obtained, enabling money to be raised for the provision of coal chutes, and the construction of a new wet dock. This considerably improved business, and the DL&PR was able to pay dividends of 8% later.

== Route of the Duffryn Llynvi and Porthcawl Railway ==
Running south from Blaenllynfi Colliery the line proceeded along the east bank of the River Llynfi to Tywith (or Ty-chwyth) and through Nantyffyllon by Heol Tywith. From there it crossed the river and followed along Bangor Terrace, behind High Street, crossing the road near the Traveller's Rest Hotel, through the Llynvi Iron Works to Llynfi Road. It then continued through Commercial Street to Bethania Street and along Llwydarth Road to the Cerdin (Cross Inn); thence to the Llwyndurys weighing house at Pontrhydycyff (Llangynwyd), after which it ran across the main road, and continued behind the modern Maesteg Comprehensive School to the old Gadlys Woollen Mill, where its embankment can be traced across Nant-y-Gadlys. The tramway then continued to Cefn Ydfa and to Tondu, where it turned west to Cefn Cwsc, Kenfig Hill, Pyle, Cornelly and finally to the harbour at Porthcawl.

The route of the tramway from Commercial Street to the Cross Inn later became the main road from the Maesteg town centre. Its unusual width is explained by the development of the railways and a road alongside it before the housing was built up.

The line was 16 3/4 miles (27 km) in length and there was a fall of 490 feet (150 m), making an average gradient of 1 in 180 (5.6‰) down to Porthcawl.

== Bridgend Railway ==
Bridgend Railway Act 1828
- Act of Parliament
- Parliament of the United Kingdom
- Long title: An Act for making and maintaining a Railway or Tram Road from the Dyffryn Llynvi and Pwll Cawl otherwise Porth Cawl Railway, to commence at a certain Point therein in the Parish of Laleston in the County of Glamorgan, and to terminate near to the Town of Bridgend in the same County.
- Citation: 9 Geo. 4. c. xcii

Dates
- Royal assent: 19 June 1828

Text of statute as originally enacted

The Bridgend Railway Company (Note: Baxter refers to this as the Bridgend Railroad Company; however section 1 of the Bridgend Railway Act 1828 created the company of proprietors under the name 'Bridgend Railway Company'.) was authorised by the Bridgend Railway Act 1828 on 19 June 1828 to build a line from Bridgend to join the DL&PR at Park Slip, a little west of Tondu, to Bridgend. The capital was £6,000.

The distance was 4 miles (6 km); it was sponsored by the same promoters as the DL&PR, and like the DL&PR it was a 4 ft 7 in (1,397 mm) gauge edge railway, using cast iron fish-bellied rails on stone block sleepers.

The line entered Bridgend along Quarella Road and terminated at The Green; very little of this line was used for the later Tondu branch line railway. The line opened on 22 October 1830. (Note: The Hereford Journal edition of 3 December 1830 refers to the line opening on the "22d inst." At that time newspapers often syndicated minor news items from other periodicals without troubling to edit or update them. The same report with similar wording but starting "On Friday, October 22, the Bridgend Railway was opened to the public..." is quoted from The Cambrian newspaper by Smith in Railways of the Llynfi Valley, page 11. Dendy Marshall muddies the water considerably by reporting the line as a plateway opening in 1834, "rather a late date for a new plateway". Awdry agrees 1830 (page 17) but Barrie and Baughan say 1834 (page 179).)

== Llynvi Valley Railway ==
The Duffryn Llynvi and Porthcawl Railway and the Bridgend Railway were simply horse-operated tramroads using primitive stone-block sleepers and cast iron rails, and as the volume of mineral activity increased, they were overwhelmed by the business offered. By the mid 1840s railway technology had advanced considerably; the South Wales Railway had been projected for some years and obtained its authorising act of Parliament, the South Wales Railway Act 1845 (8 & 9 Vict. c. cxc) in 1845, so that soon the area would be connected by a trunk railway to the British network. Local businesspeople decided to promote a new railway to modernise the DL&PR and Bridgend Railway networks.

Llynvi Valley Railway Act 1846
- Act of Parliament
- Parliament of the United Kingdom
- Long title: An Act for making a Railway from Llangynwyd to Margam, by a Company to be called "The Llynvi Valley Railway Company."
- Citation: 9 & 10 Vict. c. cccliii

Dates
- Royal assent: 7 August 1846

Other legislation
- Repealed by: Llynvi Valley Railway Act 1855

Status: Repealed

Text of statute as originally enacted

In 1845 the Llynvi Valley and South Wales Junction Railway was promoted. It would run directly down the Llynfi valley to Tondu, and then run west past Pyle to join the proposed South Wales Railway (SWR) at Margam. The name of the company was changed during the parliamentary hearings and it was the Llynvi Valley Railway (LVR) that was incorporated on 7 August 1846 by the Llynvi Valley Railway Act 1846 (9 & 10 Vict. c. cccliii), (Note: From Simmonds; also Barrie and Baughan, and also Jones, page 76; Carter says 26 August 1846 (page 139).) with authorised capital of £200,000. It was to acquire the DL&PR and convert it to modern railway standards, and to introduce locomotive operation. As the South Wales Railway was being built on the broad gauge and was to be the only main line railway in the vicinity, the Llynvi Valley Railway was to adopt the broad gauge as well.

Llynvi Valley Railway Act 1847
- Act of Parliament
- Parliament of the United Kingdom
- Long title: An Act for the Consolidation of the Duffryn Llynvi and Porth Cawl Railway Company with the Llynvi Valley Railway Company.
- Citation: 10 & 11 Vict. c. ccxcv

Dates
- Royal assent: 22 July 1847

Other legislation
- Repealed by: Llynvi Valley Railway Act 1855

Status: Repealed

Text of statute as originally enacted

The LVR acquired the DL&PR in 1847, ratified by the Llynvi Valley Railway Act 1847 (10 & 11 Vict. c. ccxcv), passed on 22 July. DL&PR shareholders got a total of £50,000 in new LVR shares.

Llynvi Valley Railway Extension Act 1847
- Act of Parliament
- Parliament of the United Kingdom
- Long title: An Act to enable the Llynvi Valley Railway Company to make an Extension of their Railway to Newcastle in the County of Glamorgan, and to amend the Act relating to their said Railway, to be called "The Llynvi Valley Railway Extension."
- Citation: 10 & 11 Vict. c. lxxix

Dates
- Royal assent: 2 July 1847

Other legislation
- Repealed by: Llynvi Valley Railway Act 1855

Status: Repealed

Text of statute as originally enacted

Already on 2 July 1847 the LVR had obtained authorisation in the Llynvi Valley Railway Extension Act 1847 (10 & 11 Vict. c. lxxix) to deviate from its earlier intended route. The South Wales Railway had originally intended to follow a route much closer to the coast between Pencoed and Margam, but now it revised its route to pass Pyle. The LVR abandoned its line to Margam, instead running south from Tondu to a triangular junction with the SWR at Bridgend, independently of the Bridgend Railway.

Llynvi Valley Railway Act 1851
- Act of Parliament
- Parliament of the United Kingdom
- Long title: An Act for amending the Acts relating to the Llynvi Valley and Duffryn Llynvi and Porth Cawl Railways, and for forming a Junction between such Railways and the South Wales Railway.
- Citation: 14 & 15 Vict. c. cxxv

Dates
- Royal assent: 1 August 1851

Other legislation
- Repealed by: Llynvi Valley Railway Act 1855

Status: Repealed

Llynvi Valley Railway Act 1853
- Act of Parliament
- Parliament of the United Kingdom
- Long title: An Act for amending the Acts relating to the "Llynvi Valley Railway Company," and for authorizing the Company to make Diversions in and improve their Line of Railway and construct a new Branch, and for better regulating the Harbour of Porth Cawl and the Rates leviable thereat; and for other Purposes.
- Citation: 16 & 17 Vict. c. cxlvi

Dates
- Royal assent: 4 August 1853

Other legislation
- Repealed by: Llynvi Valley Railway Act 1855

Status: Repealed

Text of statute as originally enacted

The LVR got a further act in 1851, the Llynvi Valley Railway Act 1851 (14 & 15 Vict. c. cxxv) authorising a short north to east connection to the SWR at Stormy, east of Pyle. (Note: Simmonds refers to this as a south-to-east connection, but this is wrong; see Cooke and the remains of the alignment on 1876 Ordnance Survey mapping.) Steam power was prohibited from being used on it. The broad gauge connection, known as the South Wales Junction Branch Railway, was constructed almost immediately, and may originally have been intended as a transhipment siding. The Cefn Cwsc colliery and Ford's Works were located a short distance from the junction of the South Wales Junction Branch Railway on LVR territory, and extensions of the broad gauge were laid in to them. This resulted in a short length of mixed gauge 4 ft 7 in (1,397 mm) and broad gauge track.

Llynvi Valley Railway Act 1855
- Act of Parliament
- Parliament of the United Kingdom
- Long title: An Act to consolidate and amend the Acts relating to the Llynvi Valley Railway Company; to enable them to construct a new Railway from Llangonoyd to Bridgend, and to extend their present Line from Foce Toll House to Saint Bride's Minor, to abandon Parts of their existing and authorized Lines, to dissolve the Bridgend Railway Company, and to abandon their Railway; and for other Purposes.
- Citation: 18 & 19 Vict. c. l

Dates
- Royal assent: 15 June 1855

Other legislation
- Repeals/revokes: Llynvi Valley Railway Act 1846; Llynvi Valley Railway Act 1847; Llynvi Valley Railway Act 1851; Llynvi Valley Railway Act 1853

Text of statute as originally enacted

However, no progress was made in the construction of the steam railway or the conversion of the DL&PR for some years, and it was not until 18 June 1855 that the Llynvi Valley Railway Act 1855 (18 & 19 Vict. c. l) was obtained authorising the LVR's intentions. These included a new line from Tywith down to Ffos Toll House west of Tondu, and in addition a new line 3 miles (5 km) long from Tondu to a junction with the SWR near Bridgend station, all to the broad gauge. The act authorised the re-incorporation of the company with a capital of £200,000, with powers to purchase the Bridgend Railway for £3,000, and to enter into working arrangements with the SWR.

In fact the first sod was cut on 15 July 1858. Brunel was the supervising engineer of the LVR construction work; he appointed Captain McNair to the post of resident engineer. The new LVR line opened to mineral traffic on 10 August 1861.

Passenger services between Bridgend and Maesteg commenced on 25 February 1864. The short South Wales Junction Branch Railway at Stormy was removed after the opening of the LVR, the only connection with the SWR then being at Bridgend. (The plateway known as the Bridgend Railway was entirely separate at this stage.)

At first the LVR made its only connection with the South Wales Railway at Stormy, east of Pyle; at the time this was a very remote location. The LVR alignment at Pyle was parallel to the South Wales Railway, but distanced from it by 100 yards (90 m), to the south. In running towards Tondu it curved round to the north and crossed the South Wales Railway main line by a flat crossing, but there was no inter-running connection there.

The line was worked by the Great Western Railway (GWR) until two engines were delivered on 4 April 1862, enabling the company to work its own traffic. The LVR terminus was first placed at the site of the later goods yard in Coity Road. Then in 1866, it crossed the bridge and ran into Bridgend Station, where it had its own platform and booking office. This station was approached by a lane behind the Coity Castle Hotel.

On 1 August 1865 the LVR started operating a passenger service to Porthcawl, in addition to the Bridgend to Maesteg service. The LVR had its own station at Pyle. The LVR line and the South Wales Railway (now GWR following amalgamation) route were not immediately adjacent and there was no connection between them, and the stations were not close together.

The Bridgend Railway route fell into disuse and later became used as a roadway; this was also the fate of parts of the DL&PR in the upper Llynfi valley. (Note: Barrie says (in Railways of the Bridgend District) that the Bridgend Railway was converted into a broad gauge railway. In fact only small parts, if any, of the Bridgend Railway system were retained and the later Bridgend–Tondu line was on an entirely different alignment.)

== Ogmore Valley Railway ==
Ogmore Valley Railways Act 1863
- Act of Parliament
- Parliament of the United Kingdom
- Long title: An Act to authorize the Construction of Railways in Glamorganshire, to be called "The Ogmore Valley Railways."
- Citation: 26 & 27 Vict. c. cxxxix

Dates
- Royal assent: 13 July 1863

Text of statute as originally enacted

Industrialists in the Ogmore Valley wanted a railway connection, and an act of Parliament, the Ogmore Valley Railways Act 1863 (26 & 27 Vict. c. cxxxix), was obtained on 13 July 1863 to construct a railway from Tondu (on the LVR) through Brynmenyn and Blackmill to Nantymoel. The railway, known as the Ogmore Valley Railway (OVR), was 7 miles (11 km) in length. Capital was to be £90,000. A significant decision was taken to construct it on the narrow (standard) gauge, and there were powers to lay a third rail (to make mixed gauge) between Tondu and Porthcawl over the LVR.

The Ogmore Valley Railway opened on 1 August 1865 from Nantymoel to Tondu for mineral traffic through to Porthcawl. it had sold a locomotive to the LVR, probably to work OVR passenger trains over the LVR to Porthcawl. and connected with the LVR at Tondu Junction.

== Porthcawl dock further improved ==
Mining output and the ironfounding businesses in the Llynfi and Ogmore valleys continued to grow, and indeed it was obviously outstripping the limited capacity of Porthcawl harbour to handle it. Although the Llynvi Valley Railway was partly mixed gauge, the Ogmore Valley Railway was narrow (standard) gauge and the two railways were operated in close collaboration. The South Wales Railway had become part of the Great Western Railway in 1863. Use of that line to convey the mineral output away was of limited use because it was broad gauge only.

The dominant partners in mining and iron operations in the Maesteg and Tondu area were the Brogden family, brothers who together controlled the majority of the iron foundries and collieries in the district. In addition they were the principal forces in both the Llynvi Valley Railway and the Ogmore Valley Railway.

Llynvi and Ogmore Railways Act 1864
- Act of Parliament
- Parliament of the United Kingdom
- Long title: An Act for authorizing the Improvement of the Harbour of Porth Cawl, to confirm Arrangements relative thereto between the Llynvi Valley Railway Company and the Ogmore Valley Railways Company; and for other Purposes.
- Citation: 27 & 28 Vict. c. xlviii

Dates
- Royal assent: 23 June 1864

This enabled a close collaboration between the two companies, and they procured an act of Parliament, the Llynvi and Ogmore Railways Act 1864 (27 & 28 Vict. c. xlviii) in June 1864 to construct the New Porthcawl Dock. Much larger and better protected from prevailing winds, it cost £250,000 to build, and was engineered by R. P. Brereton, sometime the principal assistant of Isambard Kingdom Brunel. The new dock was opened on 22 July 1867.

== Ely Valley Extension Railway ==
The Ely Valley Extension Railway (EVER) had been authorised on 28 July 1863 to build 2 1/2 miles (4 km) of broad gauge railway from the Ely Valley Railway at Gellyrhaid (near Hendreforgan) to a colliery at Gilfach Goch. The Ogmore Valley Railway company sought an eastward outlet for the mineral products it carried, and in 1865 it acquired the company.

The EVER opened for mineral traffic on 16 October 1865, but it was physically detached from the OVR and was in any case a broad gauge line. It was worked by the Great Western Railway as part of the Ely Valley Railway, which they also worked. It had a basic passenger service from 9 May 1881; the trains ran from Blackmill, reversing at Hendreforgan.

== Formation of the Llynvi and Ogmore Railway ==
Llynvi and Ogmore Railways (Amalgamation) Act 1866
- Act of Parliament
- Parliament of the United Kingdom
- Long title: An Act for the Amalgamation of the Llynvi Valley Railway Company and the Ogmore Valley Railways Company; and for other Purposes.
- Citation: 29 & 30 Vict. c. cxx

Dates
- Royal assent: 28 June 1866

Llynvi and Ogmore Railway Act 1867
- Act of Parliament
- Parliament of the United Kingdom
- Long title: An Act to enable the Llynvi and Ogmore Railway Company to increase their Capital; and for other Purposes.
- Citation: 30 & 31 Vict. c. cxv

Dates
- Royal assent: 15 July 1867

Text of statute as originally enacted

The time seemed right for the LVR and the OVR to amalgamate, and the necessary powers were secured in an act of Parliament, the Llynvi and Ogmore Railways (Amalgamation) Act 1866 (29 & 30 Vict. c. cxx) on 28 June 1866: the new company would be called the Llynvi and Ogmore Railway (L&OR).

Under the 1866 act the Ogmore Valley Railway Company was dissolved and amalgamated with the Llynvi Valley Railway Company to create the Llynvi and Ogmore Railway Company with a capital of £402,000 and borrowing powers of £133,900.

By 1868 the third rail had been laid throughout the system, and the L&OR became effectively a narrow (standard) gauge railway, although broad gauge traffic to and from the Great Western Railway system was carried on the broad gauge rails, which remained in situ for the time being.

Tondu Junction became the headquarters of the L&OR. A locomotive shed and workshops were erected there and Mr. J. Routledge was appointed the Locomotive Superintendent.

The GWR converted its South Wales system to the standard gauge in 1872, although in the meantime there was increasing hostility among mineral traffic customers against the constraints of the broad gauge, such that the L&OR projected a long line from Brynmenin to Nantgarw on the Rhymney Railway in 1871. The project would have been extremely expensive, although the London and North Western Railway encouraged it and would no doubt have contributed to the cost in order to get the access. However the GWR was motivated by now to convert its South Wales system to the standard gauge, which it did in 1872, and nothing more was heard of the scheme to reach Nantgarw. As the broad gauge system was no longer in use in South Wales, the L&OR removed the third rail that had been provided for broad gauge vehicles.

== Managed by the Great Western Railway ==
Llynvi and Ogmore Railway Act 1873
- Act of Parliament
- Parliament of the United Kingdom
- Long title: An Act for authorising the Llynvi and Ogmore Railway Company to make new Railways; to deviate portions of existing Railways; to raise additional Capital; to authorise arrangements with the Great Western Railway Company; and for other purposes.
- Citation: 36 & 37 Vict. c. clxxvii

Dates
- Royal assent: 21 July 1873

Text of statute as originally enacted

Great Western and Llynvi and Ogmore Railways Amalgamation Act 1883
- Act of Parliament
- Parliament of the United Kingdom
- Long title: An Act for amalgamating the Llynvi and Ogmore Railway Company with the Great Western Railway Company.
- Citation: 46 & 47 Vict. c. lii

Dates
- Royal assent: 29 June 1883

On 16 May 1873 the L&OR agreed with the Great Western Railway (GWR) that the latter would take over the working of their line, which by now extended to 27 miles (43 km), reaching 26 collieries. The L&OR was so successful by now that the GWR guaranteed 6% to its shareholders as its part of the agreement. This was ratified by the Llynvi and Ogmore Railway Act 1873 (36 & 37 Vict. c. clxxvii) of 1 July 1873. The GWR absorbed the L&OR ten years later on 1 July 1883 under the Great Western and Llynvi and Ogmore Railways Amalgamation Act 1883 (46 & 47 Vict. c. lii).

Meanwhile, the Porthcawl dock facilities had been improved by the (former) Llynvi Valley Railway and Ogmore Valley Railway, working together. Now capable of handling vessels of 2,000 tons, it had become an important gateway for mineral products and incoming necessities, including timber for the mines, and a shipbuilding business had been established.

== Extending to the Afan Valley ==
The northern extent of the L&OR above Maesteg had been the Blaenllynfi Colliery at Caerau, near the head of the Llynfi Valley. Cymmer Afan stood a little over 1 mile (1.6 km) away, in the Afan Valley. Considerable mineral resources existed in that valley, which at the time was served by the South Wales Mineral Railway, which led by an operationally difficult route to Briton Ferry. The intervening mountain rose to 1,138 feet (347 m). Caerau itself stood at about 640 feet (200 m).

The Great Western Railway took the decision to extend the line, starting from a junction with the Caerau line at Nantyffyllon, and driving a tunnel through the mountain to Cymmer, making a junction there with the South Wales Mineral Railway. The necessary authorising act of Parliament was obtained on 1 July 1873, to build from Nantyfyllon to Abergwynfi. The construction involved driving a tunnel 1,594 yards (1.458 km) in length, and making a large single span bridge crossing the River Afan at Cymmer. The tunnel cost £47,422. The line opened on 1 July 1878 for mineral traffic; passenger services started on 16 July 1880.

The line was continued to Abergwynfi where there were important mineral deposits, and the passenger service was extended there from Cymmer on 22 March 1886.

== Pyle improvements ==
When the South Wales Railway had constructed its main line through Pyle, it had made a level crossing with the DL&PR where it intersected it a short distance east of Pyle. There was a connecting line at Stormy, a few miles to the east, from 1851, removed in 1864, but there was otherwise no railway connection between the two railways at Pyle stations, and in fact they ran a hundred yards or so (100 m) apart. In 1876 the Great Western Railway made some improvements there. The L&OR line was altered so as to pass under the South Wales main line by a bridge. The new route opened on 13 November 1876. (Note: Mitchell and Smith erroneously indicate the earlier route of the main line of the L&OR as running due north from the west end of Pyle GWR station "between 1861 and 1876 when the flyunder was completed". This is shown by them in map XXI, and they credit The Railway Magazine. The map is taken from The Railway Magazine of March 1954, page 150, and the map is identical except for the connecting line, quite properly not shown on The Railway Magazine map. Before the diveunder of 1876 the L&OR looped round to the east of Pyle station in a broad sweep. Cobb also incorrectly shows the location of the line.)

In 1882 the alignment of the L&OR line was altered to bring it alongside the South Wales main line and connecting tracks were installed. The South Wales Railway station was relocated to be alongside the L&OR station on 1 July 1886, and the combined station was sometimes known as Pyle Junction at this period. The 1882 connection between the L&OR lines and the GWR main line was basic, and in July 1900 new enhanced connections were installed, and in 1912 further improvements linking the passenger accommodation were installed.

From before 1876 there had been a connection at the west end of Pyle GWR station, heading north to the Bryn-du coke works and colliery, and the Cefn Cibwr colliery. This was a tramway only. In 1898 this was upgraded to railway status as part of the Port Talbot Railway and Docks Company Ogmore Valleys Extension Railway scheme.

== Porthcawl ==
Under the original powers, the DL&PR provided a breakwater and small tidal harbour at Porthcawl. In the 1860s the LVR and OVR companies worked together to construct an inner wet dock of 1 1/2 acres (6,100 m^{2}), capable of handling vessels up to 2,000 tons; the new dock was equipped with coal tips and other appliances.

For some decades the little harbour enjoyed considerable success, but the increasing size of sea-going shipping and the difficult seaward access eventually militated against it in competition with larger and better equipped ports elsewhere. This was brought home forcefully in 1892 when large and efficient docks were opened at Port Talbot and Barry. Porthcawl docks went into a terminal decline, and the GWR closed the dock in 1898, although some sporadic use was made until 1906. In 1913 the docks were transferred to Porthcawl Urban District Council.

The original station at Porthcawl was north of the main road level crossing. On 6 March 1916 it was superseded by a new station nearer the sea, on the site of the old dock sidings, which were now no longer operational. In the 1920s the dock itself was filled in.

== Ely Valley Extension Railway ==
In 1865 the Ogmore Valley Railway had acquired the Ely Valley Extension Railway Company, which opened for mineral traffic on 16 October 1865. It served a colliery at Gilfach Goch, but at the time was separated from the OVR network, and it was worked by the GWR; the line was broad gauge.

In 1873 the GWR and all the broad gauge railways in South Wales converted to the narrow (standard) gauge. This prompted the L&OR (as successors to the OVR) to build the missing link, a new line from Blackmill (at the foot of the Ogmore Valley) to Hendreforgan, on the EVER. It opened on 1 September 1875.

== Cardiff and Ogmore Valley Railway ==
Cardiff and Ogmore Valley Railway Act 1873
- Act of Parliament
- Parliament of the United Kingdom
- Long title: An Act for making a Railway from the Llynvi and Ogmore Railway near Blackmill to the Great Western Railway at Llanharan, to be called the Cardiff and Ogmore Valley Railway; and for other purposes.
- Citation: 36 & 37 Vict. c. cxlvii

Dates
- Royal assent: 21 July 1873

Text of statute as originally enacted

Llynvi and Ogmore and Cardiff and Ogmore Valley Railway Companies Act 1876
- Act of Parliament
- Parliament of the United Kingdom
- Long title: An Act for the Amalgamation of the Cardiff and Ogmore Valley Railway Company with the Llynvi and Ogmore Railway Company; and for other purposes.
- Citation: 39 & 40 Vict. c. cxcv

Dates
- Royal assent: 24 July 1876

Text of statute as originally enacted

Now that the South Wales Main Line was standard gauge, the possibility opened up of taking Ogmore Valley minerals to Cardiff, or Penarth, where better shipping facilities existed. The Cardiff and Ogmore Railway (C&OR) was incorporated by the Cardiff and Ogmore Valley Railway Act 1873 (36 & 37 Vict. c. cxlvii) on 21 July 1873 to build a line from C&O Junction on the Ogmore Valley line north of Blackmill, to Llanharan on the South Wales Main Line. On the line of route it made a connection with several collieries. It opened on 2 October 1876. Sponsored by the L&OR from the outset, it was amalgamated with it by the Llynvi and Ogmore and Cardiff and Ogmore Valley Railway Companies Act 1876 (39 & 40 Vict. c. cxcv), and worked by the GWR like its parent company.

In 1877 a further line was built by the L&OR from a junction between Tondu and Brynmenyn and the Llanharan line of the C&OR (Bryncethin Junction to Ynysawdre Junction); it opened on 1 May 1877. These lines were for mineral traffic only and never carried passenger trains. From 1889 the Barry Railway opened its connection from Peterston to Drope Junction and Barry, giving a useful connection to the docks there.

== Blaengarw ==
The Great Western Railway promoted a further branch line to serve the central valley at Blaengarw. It was 5 1/4 miles (8.4 km) long from Brynmenin Junction, a short distance west of Tondu. There were gradients of 1 in 34 (29.4‰) in the passenger section, and 1 in 18 (55.6‰) in the minerals-only upper part.

Ogmore Valley Railways Act 1866
- Act of Parliament
- Parliament of the United Kingdom
- Long title: An Act for authorizing the Ogmore Valley Railways Company to make Extension Railways; to raise additional Monies; and for other Purposes.
- Citation: 29 & 30 Vict. c. cclii

Dates
- Royal assent: 23 July 1866

Text of statute as originally enacted

The passing of the Ogmore Valley Railways Act 1866 (29 & 30 Vict. c. cclii) of 28 June 1866 had sanctioned the company to construct a branch line to the Garw Valley. However, as a result of a general depression in trade, the scheme was long delayed, and it was not until 25 October 1876 that a branch line was finally opened to Blaengarw at the head of the Garw Valley.

== Amalgamation with the Great Western Railway ==
The Llynvi and Ogmore Railway had been worked by the Great Western Railway since 1873. This left an ambiguity over financial responsibility for major improvements to the system, and formal amalgamation was a logical step. The L&OR was absorbed by the Great Western Railway (GWR), from 1 July 1883.

After the amalgamation the GWR made considerable alterations to the old system on the Llynfi Valley line. In 1898 Maesteg station was relocated a short distance northwards from the original location, and double track was installed.

Tywith station was opened on 19 July 1880, initially with only one platform. In 1898 a second platform was opened, and both were constructed to a longer length. Tywith Station was renamed Nantyfyllon on 1 January 1903. A new GWR station was opened at Llangonoyd in 1899; the new station was renamed Llangynwyd in March 1935. Meanwhile, Troedyrhiw Garth Station was built in the 1870s during the time when the GWR was working and managing the L&OR, but the platform was lengthened in 1910, and shortened again in 1938.

Caerau Station, at the head of the line in the Llynfi Valley, was the last station to be opened, on 1 April 1901, following the development of the Caerau district at the turn of the nineteenth century. Also in 1901 the main section of the line from Tondu to Bridgend was doubled. Finally, with the opening of Blaengarw Station on 26 May 1902, a full passenger service was provided for the three valleys—Llynfi, Garw and Ogmore—converging at Tondu.

The poor approach to Porthcawl Dock, together with its inadequate facilities, once more made it impossible for the site to compete economically with other South Wales ports, especially as larger steamships were coming into use. Hence at the turn of the century the dock virtually ceased to function as a port, and it was closed by the GWR in 1906. Porthcawl town developed as a seaside resort with a new railway station built on the site of the old dock lines in March 1916, and during the years of the Second World War the dock was filled in.

When the Vale of Glamorgan Railway was being constructed, ready for its opening in 1897, it had sought running powers to Tondu, but these were refused, and exchange sidings had to be built at Coity Junction.

== Rhondda and Swansea Bay Railway ==
The mineral wealth of the Rhondda Valley proved immensely lucrative to the Taff Vale Railway, and later others, in conveying coal to Bristol Channel ports for shipment. At the end of the 1870s, the Swansea harbour authorities were expanding their dock facilities, and wished to bring more business in their direction.

The Rhondda and Swansea Bay Railway (R&SBR) was authorised on 10 August 1882. Construction involved a 3,443-yard (3.148 km) tunnel from the head of the Afan valley to Blaenrhondda, and the rock was exceptionally hard, making the construction supremely difficult.

The Rhondda and Swansea Bay Railway opened from Aberavon to Cymmer was opened on 2 November 1885, and the R&SBR opened a station there alongside the L&OR (GWR) station. Opening of the tunnel was much delayed: the line was opened from Cymmer to Blaengwynfi, short of the tunnel, on 2 June 1890, and through the tunnel to Blaenrhondda on 2 July 1890.

== Port Talbot Railway and Dock ==
On 31 August 1897 the Port Talbot Railway and Docks Company opened its mineral line through Maesteg, on a sinuous west to east alignment crossing over the L&OR route.

At first this terminated at Lletty Brongu, but on 17 January 1898 the line was extended further, to Pontyrhyll, where it made a junction with the Garw branch. Running powers up the Garw line had been sought but refused, so Pontyrhyll was an exchange point.

These incursions were followed on 19 December 1898 by a line—the "Ogmore Valleys Extension" of the Port Talbot Railway and Dock (PTR&D)—from Port Talbot along the coast, turning east over the South Wales main line to a junction with the L&OR line at Cefn Junction, giving access towards Tondu. At the same time a spur to Pyle, entering from the north west, was opened. This followed the course of a tramway that had existed since before 1876.

== The Grouping of the Railways in 1922 ==
Following the difficult operating conditions during World War I the government decided to restructure most of the railways of Great Britain into one or other of four new large companies, a process called the "Grouping", by the Railways Act 1921. The South Wales railway companies became part of a new Great Western Railway. The L&OR group of lines had been part of the Great Western Railway since 1883, but the process did away with the competition with other South Wales companies.

The first of the amalgamations took effect on 1 January 1922 and contributed to a passenger connecting service with the former L&OR and the former R&SBR at Cymmer, the result of which provided a through service from the Llynfi Valley to the Rhondda via the tunnel at the head of the Afan Valley.

== From 1923 ==
The passenger service between Blackmill, Hendreforgan and Gilfach Goch was withdrawn on 5 March 1928, but local protests succeeded in getting the service restored; however this was now from the east instead of from Blackmill, and established travel patterns were not catered for. Final closure followed on 22 September 1930. The mineral line of the Cardiff and Ogmore Railway between C&O Junction and Bryncethin Junction was closed completely on 28 July 1938.

Pyle west Loop was laid out before the second world war but only commissioned on 15 September 1946. As a south to west curve, it was used by limestone traffic between Cornelly Sidings and the Abbey steelworks, and by morning and evening residential passenger trains between Swansea and Porthcawl.

== From 1948 ==
Following World War II the government again imposed a restructuring process on the railways of Great Britain: they were taken into national ownership under British Railways.

At the same time the mineral industries were declining, and the population also was diminishing as workers moved to other parts of the country for work. The rise of efficient road-based public transport hit the viability of the passenger train services.

The Blaengarw branch passenger service was discontinued from 9 February 1953, and the Ogmore Vale Branch lost the Nantymoel service on 5 May 1958.

=== 1960s closures ===
The R&SBR line and the GWR (L&OR) line ran parallel and adjacent from Cymmer to Blaengwynfi. In 1960 expensive repairs to Gelli Tunnel and Groeserw Viaduct on the R&SBR line became necessary, and instead a connection between the two routes was made, enabling trains on the R&SBR route to use 1 1/2 miles (2.4 km) of the GWR line, by-passing the defective section, which was closed. The L&OR line was connected into the R&SBR station, and east of the station a slue was made back into it. A new junction was made some distance west of Blaengwynfi, where the two routes separated once again. The new arrangement was commissioned on 13 June 1960.

On the same day however Abergwynfi Station, at the head of the former L&OR Extension line in the Afan Valley, was closed to passenger traffic. The service from Bridgend via Cymmer Afan was transferred to Blaengwynfi station. Goods traffic continued to use the Abergwynfi Station until 27 May 1963.

On 3 December 1962 the Treherbert to Swansea passenger service on the former R&SBR was withdrawn, and replaced by a new diesel rail car service between Treherbert and Bridgend over the rearranged lines at Cymmer. From 18 April 1964 nearly all the L&OR network was diesel hauled, following re-organisation of Tondu locomotive depot.

On 5 June 1961 the section from Gellyrhaidd Junction to Gilfach Goch was closed completely.

The Porthcawl branch and the Pyle to Tondu service was closed to passengers on 9 September 1963, and the entire Porthcawl branch closed to all traffic on 1 February 1965.

Llanharan Junction was severed on 3 December 1962 and remaining C&OR served pits around Wern Tarw reached from Bryncethin Junction and the Pencoed branch. Known afterwards as the Raglan branch, the Ogmore Junction to Wern Tarw section continued in operation but it was later closed in September 1983.

The R&SBR line in the Afan Valley was closed from Duffryn Rhondda down to Aberavon and Briton Ferry in 1964. From that time coal from Duffryn Rhondda Colliery was hauled up the valley to Cymmer, and after reversal, taken down the L&OR route to Bridgend via Maesteg. However Duffryn Rhondda colliery closed in October 1966.

Freight operation in the Garw and Ogmore branches ceased on 22 March 1965, but coal traffic continued until final closure in 1980.

=== 1970s closures ===
The passenger service between Bridgend and Treherbert continued longer than some of the others, because of the mountainous terrain and the difficulty of securing reliable replacement bus services. It closed down on 22 June 1970, although school trains continued between Cymmer and Llangynwyd until 14 July 1970.

The section between Nantyffyllon and Caerau closed for freight traffic on 7 September 1976 and was formally closed on 7 March 1977. Traffic from Caerau Colliery continued to travel via the Coegnant inlet to the Maesteg Colliery until the closure of Caerau Colliery on 27 August 1977.

Traffic lower down the line was also lost in 1977 with the closure of the Llynfi Power Station which had been opened in 1943. Further traffic was lost in 1981 when the Bridgend Paper Mills traffic transferred to road transport; the small mines and coal yard traffic at Maesteg station ended when Coegnant Colliery ceased production in 1981.

== 1992 reopening to passengers ==
On 26 October 1992 the line between Bridgend and Maesteg was reopened by British Rail and Mid Glamorgan County Council for passenger trains. New stations were provided at Wildmill and Sarn, just south of the site of the former Aberkenfig station, Garth, a little north of the former Troedyrhiew Garth station, Maesteg Ewenny Road, and Maesteg, a little south of the original Maesteg station.

== Llynvi and Ogmore Railway locomotives ==
=== Broad gauge 0-6-0ST ===
0-6-0ST
Type and origin
- Power type: Steam
- Builder: Slaughter, Grunning & Co.
Specifications
- Configuration
  - Whyte: 0-6-0ST
- Gauge: 7 ft (2,134 mm)
- Driver dia.: 4 ft 6 in (1,372 mm)
- Wheelbase: 15 ft 5 in (4,699 mm)
- Cylinder size: dia × stroke, 16.5 in × 24 in (419 mm × 610 mm)

- Ada (1862–1868)
- Una (1862–1868)

The railway owned two 0-6-0STs for goods traffic. Built by Slaughter, Grunning and Company, they were similar to the South Devon Railway Dido class built at around the same time.

In 1868 they were exchanged for standard gauge locomotives from the West Cornwall Railway, which had recently been rebuilt to allow broad gauge trains to run through from the Great Western Railway to Penzance.

In 1876 Ada and Una became GWR 2146 and 2147 respectively. They were withdrawn in 1884 and 1886.

=== Broad gauge 4-4-0ST ===
4-4-0ST
Type and origin
- Power type: Steam
- Builder: Slaughter, Grunning & Co.
Specifications
- Configuration
  - Whyte: 4-4-0ST
- Gauge: 7 ft (2,134 mm)
- Leading dia.: 3 ft 6 in (1,067 mm)
- Driver dia.: 5 ft 6 in (1,676 mm)
- Wheelbase: 18 ft 0 in (5,486 mm)
- Cylinder size: dia × stroke 16.5 in × 24 in (419 mm × 610 mm)

- Rosa (1863–1868)

The railway owned a single 4-4-0ST passenger tank locomotive. Built by Slaughter, Grunning and Company, it was similar to the South Devon Railway Eagle class.

Rosa was also exchanged for West Cornwall Railway rolling stock in 1868. It was then rebuilt as an 0-6-0ST, making it similar to Ada and Una.

It became GWR 2145 and was withdrawn in 1885.

=== Standard gauge ===
Twelve Lynvi and Ogmore Railway locomotives were acquired by the Great Western Railway in 1873 and renumbered 915 to 926.

- 5 Sharp, Stewart and Company 0-6-0ST (1865)
- 4 Robert Stephenson and Company 2-4-0 ex-West Cornwall Railway (1868), three rebuilt as tank locomotives
- 3 Black, Hawthorn & Co. (1871)

== Topography ==
=== Afan Valley Extension ===
- Ocean Colliery;
- Abergwynfi; open 22 March 1886; closed 13 June 1960;
- Cymmer; opened 19 July 1880; amalgamated with Cymmer Afan station as Cymmer General January 1950; closed 13 June 1960;
- Cymmer South Junction; convergence of South Wales Mineral Railway;
- Caerau; opened 1 April 1909; closed to public 22 June 1970; school use to 15 July 1970;
- Nantyffyllon; convergence with LVR main line (below).

=== Llynvi Valley Railway main line ===
- Duffryn goods;
- Tywith; opened 19 July 1880; renamed Nantyffyllon 1 January 1903; closed 22 June 1970; school use to 14 July 1970;
- Maesteg Castle Street; opened 25 February 1864; renamed Maesteg Castle Street 1 July 1924 to 1968; closed to public 22 June 1970; school use until 14 July 1970;
- Maesteg opened 28 September 1992; still open;
- Maesteg Ewenny Road; opened 26 October 1992; still open;
- Garth Mid Glamorgan; opened 28 September 1992; still open;
- Troedyrhiew Garth; open by October 1873; closed to public 22 June 1970; school use until 14 July 1970;
- Llangynwyd; open from September 1865; new station 1897; closed 1 January 1917; reopened 1 January 1919; renamed Llangynwydd March 1935; schools only from 22 June 1970; last school train 14 July 1970;
- Tondu North Junction; divergence of North Loop towards Brynmenin;
- Tondu; opened 25 February 1864; closed 22 June 1970; reopened 28 September 1992; convergence of OVR line; divergence of line to Bridgend;
- Cefn Junction; divergence of Ogmore Valleys Extension Railway to Margam;
- Cefn opened 1 August 1865; renamed Kenfig Hill from 1 August 1885; closed 5 May 1958;
- South Wales Junction; divergence of South Wales Junction Railway to Stormy 1851 to 1864;
- Pyle; opened 1 August 1865; amalgamated with main line station 13 November 1876; closed 9 September 1963; main line station closed 2 November 1964;
- Heol-y-Sheet Junction; convergence of Pyle West Loop from Port Talbot direction;
- Porthcawl Golfers' Platform; opened by July 1902; opened to public as Nottage Halt 14 July 1924; closed 9 September 1963;
- Porthcawl first station; opened 1 August 1865; resited to south 6 March 1916;
- Porthcawl second station; opened 6 March 1916; closed 9 September 1963.

=== Bridgend Branch ===
- Tondu (above);
- Aberkenfig; opened by April 1869; closed by January 1870;
- Sarn; opened 28 September 1992; still open;
- Coity Junction;
- Wildmill; opened 18 November 1992; closed same day (safety) reopened 12 December 1992; still open;
- Bridgend (L&OR station); opened 25 February 1864; closed and trains diverted to GWR station 1 July 1873.

=== Pyle West Loop ===
- Heol-y-Sheet Junction;
- Pyle West Loop Junction.

=== Garw Valley ===
- Blaengarw; used by miners from 1877; open to public 26 May 1902; closed 9 February 1953;
- Pontycymmer; miners only 1877; open to public 1 June 1889; closed 9 February 1953;
- Pontyrhyll; opened 25 October 1886; closed 9 February 1953; divergence of Port Talbot Railway and Dock line;
- Llangeinor; opened 25 October 1886; closed 1 January 1917; reopened 1 January 1919; closed 9 February 1953;
- Brynmenin; opened 12 May 1873; renamed Brynmenyn 1886; closed 5 May 1958; convergence of Blackmill branch; divergence of Brynmenin Loop towards Pencoed;
- Ynysawdre Junction; convergence of line from Pencoed;
- Tondu Ogmore Junction; divergence of Tondu North Loop towards Maesteg;
- Tondu; above.

=== Ogmore Valley ===
- Nantymoel; opened 12 May 1873; closed 5 May 1958;
- Wyndham Halt; opened 10 August 1942; closed 5 May 1958;
- Tynewydd; opened 12 May 1873; renamed Ogmore Vale 1 January 1902; closed 5 May 1958;
- C&O Junction; divergence of line to Llanharan (below);
- Lewistown Halt; opened 10 August 1942; closed 4 June 1951;
- Blackmill; convergence of line from Hendreforgan; opened 12 May 1873; closed 5 May 1958;
- Brynmenyn (above).

=== Blackmill branch ===
- Blackmill (above);
- Hendreforgan (below).

=== Gilfach Branch ===
- Gilfach Goch Colliery Platform; miners only; open after 1915; closed by June 1954;
- Gilfach; opened 9 May 1881; closed 5 March 1928; reopened 26 March 1928; renamed Gilfach Goch 1928; closed 22 September 1930;
- Hendreforgan; opened 1 September 1875; closed 5 March 1928; reopened 26 March 1928; closed 22 September 1930;
- Gellirhaidd Colliery; end-on junction with Ely Valley Railway.

=== Cardiff and Ogmore Branch ===
- C&O Junction; above;
- Bryncethin Junction; convergence of line from Tondu;
- Llanharan; convergence with Bridgend to Cardiff main line.

=== Pencoed branch ===
- Ynysawdre Junction; above;
- Brynmenin Tynycoed Junction; convergence of Brynmenin Loop.
- Bryncethin Junction; convergence with C&O branch.

=== Brynmenin Loop ===
- Brynmenin Junction;
- Brynmenin Tynycoed Junction.
