= South Devon Railway Comet class =

Class of British steam locomotives

South Devon Railway Comet Class
Type and origin
- Power type: Steam
- Designer: Daniel Gooch
- Builder: R. B. Longridge and Company (5); Haigh Foundry (4); William Fairbairn & Sons (1); Stothert, Slaughter and Company (2)
- Build date: October 1851 – April 1853
Specifications
- Configuration
  - Whyte: 4-4-0ST
- Gauge: 7 ft 1/4 in (2,140 mm)
- Leading dia.: 3 ft 6 in (1.07 m)
- Driver dia.: 5 ft 9 in (1.75 m)
- Wheelbase: 5 ft 0 in (1.52 m) +; 5 ft 1 in (1.55 m) +; 7 ft 8 in (2.34 m)
- Water cap.: 800 imp gal (3,600 L; 960 US gal)
- Firebox
  - Grate area: 22 sq ft (2.0 m^{2})
- Boiler
  - Pitch: 6 ft 8 in (2.032 m)
  - Diameter: 4 ft 5 in (1.35 m) (outside)
  - Tube plates: 10 ft 6 in (3.20 m)
  - Small tubes: 2 in (51 mm), 220 off
- Heating surface
  - Firebox: 118 sq ft (11.0 m^{2})
  - Tubes: 1,205 sq ft (111.9 m^{2})
  - Total surface: 1,323 sq ft (122.9 m^{2})
- Cylinder size: 17 in × 24 in (430 mm × 610 mm)
Career
- Operators: South Devon Railway; Great Western Railway
- Class: Comet

The Comet class were 12 4-4-0ST broad gauge locomotives operated on Britain's South Devon Railway and associated railways. They were designed for passenger trains on this steep and sharply curved line but were also used on goods trains when required.

They were ordered by Evans and Geach who were contracted to operate the railway's locomotives. They were designed by Daniel Gooch and based on his Bogie class locomotives built for the Great Western Railway who had previously operated the South Devon Railway.

On 1 February 1876 the South Devon Railway was amalgamated with the Great Western Railway, the locomotives were given numbers by their new owners but continued to carry their names too.

Six similar locomotives were built for the Vale of Neath Railway by Robert Stephenson and Company in 1851. Some of these could be found working on the South Devon lines after the 1876 amalgamation.

== Locomotives ==
- Aurora (1852 – 1878) GWR no. 2099

Built by Longridge and Company. Named after the goddess Aurora.

- Comet (1851 – 1884) GWR no. 2096

Built by Longridge and Company. On 1 August 1853, it was working an express train when it collided with Ixion, which had passed a danger signal at Rattery, Devon.
The name Comet represents a heavenly body, and was reused on a Leopard class locomotive built in 1875.

- Damon (1852 – 1876) GWR no. 2101

Built by the Haigh Foundry, it was named after Damon, a Greek mythological character.

- Falcon (1852 – 1878) GWR no. 2102

Built by the Haigh Foundry. On 13 September 1866, Falcon was working the mail train when it failed to stop at the signal at Plympton so it collided with Brutus, which ran away to Plymouth. It was named after a bird, the falcon.

- Ixion (1853 – 1878) GWR no. 2105

Built by Stothert and Slaughter. On 1 August 1853, Ixion was working a goods train from Exeter to Plymouth. At Rattery the driver ignored a danger signal and collided with a mail train while shunting. Ixion was badly damaged and was out of use for many months, despite having seen less than five months' work at the time. Named after Ixion from Greek mythology.

- Lance (1851 – 1873)

Built by Longridge and Company. Lance was written off after it was involved in a head-on collision with another train near Menheniot railway station on the Cornwall Railway on 2 December 1873. At the time it was providing front-end assistance to a heavy goods train. The name Lance means a projectile, and was reused on a Leopard class locomotive built in 1875.

- Meteor (1851 – 1881) GWR no. 2098

Built by Longridge and Company, Meteor was named after a heavenly body, a meteor.

- Orion (1853 – 1878) GWR no. 2103

Built by the Haigh Foundry. Named after Orion, a Greek Titan.

- Osiris (1853 – 1873)

Built by Stothert and Slaughter. On 31 October 1853, it was approaching Totnes railway station with a passenger train when it was hit by a goods train which had been unable to stop after descending the incline from Rattery. After withdrawal, Osiris was taken to Portreath where it provided steam for the stationary engine that powered the cable railway which raised wagons from the harbour up to the West Cornwall Railway line.
Named after Osiris, the Egyptian god of death, the name was reused on a Leopard class 4-4-0ST.

- Ostrich (1852 – 1877) GWR no. 2104

Built by Fairbairn and Sons, Ostrich was named after a large African bird, the ostrich.

- Priam (1851 – 1876) GWR no. 2100

Built by the Haigh Foundry, it was named after Priam, the king of Troy.

- Rocket (1851 – 1877) GWR no. 2097

Built by Longridge and Company, it was named after a projectile, a rocket.
