= South Devon Railway Tornado class =

Class of British steam locomotives

Tornado
Type and origin
- Power type: Steam
- Designer: Daniel Gooch
- Builder: Vulcan Foundry
- Serial number: 365–366, 401–402
Specifications
- Configuration
  - Whyte: 0-6-0ST
- Gauge: 7 ft (2,134 mm)
- Driver dia.: 4 ft 9 in (1.448 m)
- Wheelbase: 15 ft 7 in (4.75 m)
- Cylinder size: 17 in × 24 in (432 mm × 610 mm)
Career
- Operators: South Devon Railway
- Class: Tornado

The four Tornado class locomotives were 0-6-0ST broad gauge locomotives operated on the South Devon Railway and associated railways. They were designed for goods trains but were also used on passenger trains when required.

They were ordered by Evans and Geach who were contracted to operate the railway's locomotives. They were designed by Daniel Gooch and based on his Banking Class locomotives built for the Great Western Railway who had previously operated the South Devon Railway, and built by the Vulcan Foundry.

On 1 February 1876 the South Devon Railway was amalgamated with the Great Western Railway, the locomotives were given numbers by their new owners but continued to carry their names too.

Three similar locomotives were built for the Vale of Neath Railway in 1854. Some of these could be found working on the South Devon lines after the 1876 amalgamation.

== Locomotives ==
- Goliah (1855 – 1885) GWR no. 2141
  This locomotive was named after a biblical character, Goliath.
- Sampson (1855 – 1884) GWR no. 2142
  This locomotive was named after Samson, a biblical character associated with Goliath.
- Tornado (1854 – 1884) GWR no. 2139
  On 13 March 1860 Tornado was working a goods train at Totnes when its boiler exploded, killing the driver. It was also notorious for being the locomotive of a runaway china clay train at Burngullow on the Cornwall Railway on 29 October 1872.
  A tornado is a kind of wind.
- Volcano (1854 – 1877) GWR no. 2140
  A volcano is a mountain that erupts magma.
