= South Devon Railway 0-4-0 locomotives =

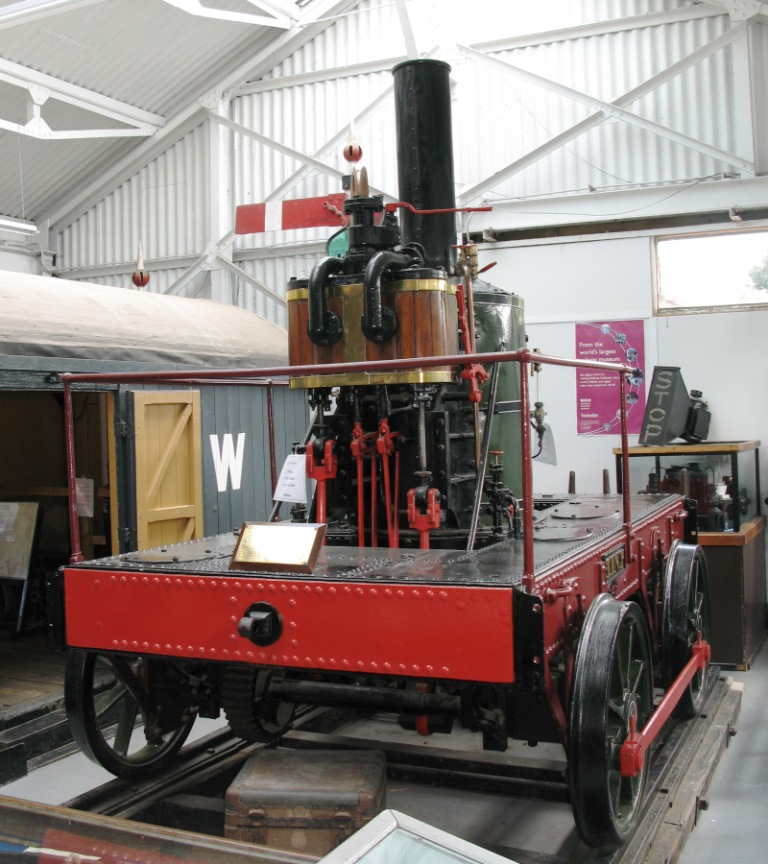
Tiny on display at Buckfastleigh

The South Devon Railway 0-4-0 locomotives were small 0-4-0 broad gauge locomotives operated on the South Devon Railway, Cornwall Railway, mainly on the dockside lines around Plymouth.

On 1 February 1876 the South Devon Railway was amalgamated with the Great Western Railway, the locomotives were given numbers by their new owners but continued to carry their names too.

== Tiny ==
Tiny
Type and origin
- Power type: Steam
- Builder: Sara and Company
Specifications
- Configuration
  - Whyte: 0-4-0VBT
- Gauge: 7 ft 1/4 in (2,140 mm)
- Driver dia.: 3 ft 0 in (0.91 m)
- Wheelbase: 5 ft 9 in (1.75 m)
- Cylinder size: 9 in × 12 in (230 mm × 300 mm)
Career
- Operators: South Devon Railway, Great Western Railway
- Disposition: Static display

- Tiny (1868 – 1883) GWR no. 2180

Tiny was built by Sara and Company of Penryn, Cornwall. It has a vertical boiler and is similar to four locomotives that later worked in the docks at Falmouth in Cornwall. It was used to replace a horse for wagon shunting on the Sutton Docks branch in Plymouth.

After withdrawal it was used at Newton Abbot where it was used to power machinery in the workshops there. By 1927 it was no longer required for this purpose and was displayed on the station platform opposite the workshops. In the 1980s it was moved to Buckfastleigh railway station on the heritage South Devon Railway, where it is displayed in the museum.

Tiny is the last surviving locomotive originally built to Brunel's 7 ft 0 1/4 in (2140 mm) broad gauge. It is part of the UK National Collection.

== Owl class ==
Owl
Type and origin
- Power type: Steam
- Builder: Avonside Engine Company
Specifications
- Configuration
  - Whyte: 0-4-0WT
- Gauge: 7 ft 0 1/4 in (2.140 m)
- Driver dia.: 3 ft 0 in (0.91 m)
- Wheelbase: 7 ft 0 in (2.13 m)
- Cylinder size: 11 in × 16 in (280 mm × 410 mm)
Career
- Operators: South Devon Railway, Great Western Railway, Pearson & Son
- Class: Owl
- Disposition: All scrapped

The three Owl class locomotives had well tanks and were built by the Avonside Engine Company.

- Owl (1873 – 1889) GWR no. 2172
  The locomotive was named after the bird Owl.
- Goat (1873 – 1885) GWR no. 2174
  The locomotive was named after the animal Goat.
  Owl and Goat were withdrawn and stored. In 1890 they were sold to Pearson and Son, engineers contracted to work on the railway near Ivybridge. Once this work was finished in 1893 they were sold back to the Great Western Railway, then converted to standard gauge and worked until 1913.
- Weasel (1873 – 1882) GWR no. 2173
  The locomotive was named after the animal Weasel. It was withdrawn in 1882 and scrapped.

== Raven class ==
Raven
Type and origin
- Power type: Steam
- Builder: Avonside Engine Company
Specifications
- Configuration
  - Whyte: 0-4-0ST
- Gauge: 7 ft 1/4 in (2,140 mm)
- Driver dia.: 3 ft 0 in (0.91 m)
- Wheelbase: 7 ft 6 in (2.29 m)
- Cylinder size: 14 in × 18 in (360 mm × 460 mm)
Career
- Operators: South Devon Railway, Great Western Railway, Wantage Tramway, Powlesland & Mason
- Class: Raven
- Disposition: All scrapped

The seven Raven class were saddle tank locomotives and were again built by the Avonside Engine Company. They were highly unusual for broad gauge locomotives in having outside cylinders.

- Crow (1874 – 1892) GWR no. 2177
  After gauge conversion in 1892 Crow was rebuilt as a standard gauge locomotive and ran in this form as no. 1331 until sold to Powlesland and Mason for work at Swansea harbour.
  The locomotive was named after the bird Crow, a member of the crow family.
- Jay (1875 – 1892) GWR no. 2179
  After gauge conversion in 1892 Jay was rebuilt as a standard gauge locomotive and ran in this form as no. 1333 until sold to Powlesland and Mason for work at Swansea harbour.
  The locomotive was named after the bird Jay, a member of the crow family.
- Lark (1874 – 1892) GWR no. 2178
  After gauge conversion in 1892 Lark was rebuilt as a standard gauge locomotive and ran in this form as no. 1332 until sold to Powlesland and Mason for work at Swansea harbour.
  The locomotive was named after the bird Lark.
- Raven (1874 – 1892) GWR no. 2175
  Raven was sold to the Torbay and Brixham Railway in 1877. In 1883 this railway was sold to the Great Western Railway. After gauge conversion in 1892 it was rebuilt as a standard gauge locomotive and ran in this form as no. 1329, eventually finding it way to the Wantage Tramway where it was withdrawn in 1919 following an accident.
  The locomotive was named after the bird Raven, a member of the crow family.
- Rook (1874 – 1891) GWR no. 2176
  After gauge conversion in 1892 Rook was rebuilt as a standard gauge locomotive and ran in this form as no. 1330 and until 1906 when it was sold to Powlesland and Mason for work at Swansea harbour and they gave it number 7. On 1 January 1924 it was one of nine Powlesland and Mason locomotives that returned to the Great Western Railway. It was given new GWR number 925 and was finally withdrawn in 1929.
  The locomotive was named after the bird rook, a member of the crow family.
