= South Devon Railway Dido class =

Class of 8 British broad-gauge 0-6-0ST locomotives

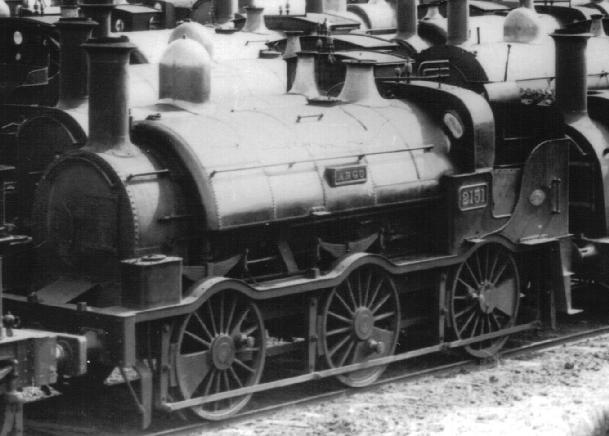
- GWR 2151 Argo at Swindon in 1892 awaiting dismantling following the end of the Great Western Railway's broad gauge services.
Type and origin
- Power type: Steam
- Builder: Slaughter, Grüning and Company
- Serial number: 392–396, 523–524, 558
- Build date: 1860–1864
- Total produced: 8
Specifications
- Configuration
  - Whyte: 0-6-0ST
  - UIC: C n2t
- Gauge: 7 ft 1/4 in (2,140 mm)
- Driver dia.: First two: 4 ft 6 in (1.37 m); Remainder: 4 ft 9 in (1.45 m)
- Wheelbase: First two: 15 ft 5 in (4.70 m); Remainder: 15 ft 4 in (4.67 m)
- Water cap.: 1,100 imp gal (5,000 L; 1,300 US gal)
- Cylinders: Two, inside
- Cylinder size: First two: 16 1/2 in × 24 in (420 mm × 610 mm); Remainder: 17 in × 24 in (430 mm × 610 mm)
Career
- Operators: South Devon Railway; → Great Western Railway
- Class: Dido
- Numbers: GWR 2143–44, 2148–53
- Withdrawn: 1877–1892
- Disposition: All scrapped

The eight Dido class locomotives were 0-6-0ST broad gauge locomotives operated on the South Devon Railway and Cornwall Railway and associated other adjacent railways. They were designed for goods trains but were also used on passenger trains when required.

The locomotives were ordered by Evans, Walker and Gooch who were now contracted to operate the locomotives for both the railways. They were built by Slaughter, Grüning and Company.

The locomotives of both railways were operated as a combined fleet by the South Devon Railway after 1 July 1866. On 1 February 1876 the South Devon Railway was amalgamated with the Great Western Railway, the locomotives were given numbers by their new owners but continued to carry their names too.

Four similar locomotives were built for the Vale of Neath Railway in 1861. Some of these could be found working on the South Devon lines after the 1876 amalgamation.

There is some question of identification between some members of this class and the closely related Romulus class, see Sheppard (2008). The earlier Dido locomotives had 16½ in × 24 in cylinders and 4 ft 6 in driving wheels, the later Romulus locomotives had slightly larger cylinders and wheels of 17 in × 24 in and 4 ft 9 in wheels. Sheppard (2008) lists Hebe, Ajax, Brutus, Argo, Atlas, Juno as the Romulus class, along with Romulus and Remus. The Dido class (which Sheppard (2008) describes as the Ada class) consists of Dido and Hero, together with three Llynvi Valley Railway locomotives: Rosa (rebuilt from a 4-4-0ST), Ada and Una.

== Locomotives ==
=== South Devon Railway ===
- Hebe (Slaughter, Güning & Co. 394 of 1860); GWR no. 2148; withdrawn 1877

Hebe was at Brent on 22 November 1873 when its boiler blew up. It got its name from Hebe, the Greek goddess of youth.

- Ajax (SG 395 of 1860); GWR no. 2149; withdrawn 1884

The locomotive was named after Ajax, a Greek hero.

- Brutus (SG 396(?) of 1862) GWR no. 2150; withdrawn 1884

Although a South Devon Railway locomotive, it was originally delivered to work on the Cornwall Railway. On 13 September 1866 Brutus failed while working a goods train. It was left at Plympton while another locomotive took the train on. The mail train failed to stop at the signal and collided with the locomotive standing there, after which it ran away down the line, running through the buffer stop at the Plymouth terminus and ending up in the cloakroom.
The original Brutus was one of Julius Caesar's assassins.

- Juno (SG 558 of 1864); GWR no. 2153; withdrawn 1884

The Roman Juno was worshipped as the queen of their gods.

=== Cornwall Railway ===
- Dido (SG 392 of 1860); GWR no. 2143; withdrawn 1877

The name of this locomotive comes from Dido, the Queen of Carthage.

- Hero (SG 393 of 1860); GWR no. 2144; withdrawn 1887

A hero can be an idealized character in mythology or folklore but in this case probably refers to Hero, a priestess of Aphrodite.

- Argo (SG 523 of 1863); GWR no. 2151; withdrawn 1892

The original Argo was the ship that carried Jason and the Argonauts on their adventures.

- Atlas (SG 594 of 1863); GWR no. 2152; withdrawn 1885

The original Atlas was a Greek Titan.

== Selected bibliography ==
- Reed, P. J. T. (February 1953). White, D. E. (ed.). The Locomotives of the Great Western Railway, Part 2: Broad Gauge. Kenilworth: RCTS. ISBN 0-901115-32-0. OCLC 650490992.
- Beck, Keith; Copsey, John (1990). The Great Western in South Devon. Didcot: Wild Swan Publications. ISBN 0-906867-90-8.
- Gregory, R H (1982). The South Devon Railway. Salisbury: The Oakwood Press. ISBN 0-85361-286-2.
- Waters, Laurence (1999). The Great Western Broad Gauge. Hersham: Ian Allan Publishing. ISBN 0-7110-2634-3.
- Railway company records at The National Archives
