= South Devon Railway Buffalo class =

Buffalo
Type and origin
- Power type: Steam
- Builder: Avonside Engine Company
Specifications
- Configuration
  - Whyte: 0-6-0ST
- Gauge: 7 ft 1/4 in (2,140 mm)
- Driver dia.: 4 ft 9 in (1.45 m)
- Wheelbase: 15 ft 5 in (4.70 m)
- Cylinder size: 17 in × 24 in (430 mm × 610 mm)
Career
- Operators: South Devon Railway, Great Western Railway
- Class: Buffalo

The ten Buffalo class locomotives were 0-6-0ST broad gauge locomotives operated on the South Devon Railway, Cornwall Railway and West Cornwall Railway. They were designed for goods trains but were also used on passenger trains when required.

These locomotives were built by the Avonside Engine Company and designed for easy conversion to standard gauge after the broad gauge was converted on 21 May 1892.

The locomotives of the three railways were operated as a combined fleet by the South Devon Railway but each was accounted to the railway that ordered it. On 1 February 1876 the South Devon Railway was amalgamated with the Great Western Railway, the locomotives were given numbers by their new owners but continued to carry their names too.

== Locomotives ==
=== South Devon Railway ===
- Achilles (1873–1892) GWR no. 2165
  Converted to standard gauge and worked in this form as no. 1324 until 1905 when it was sold to the South Wales Mineral Railway and became their no. 7, later returning to the Great Western Railway and running as no. 818 until finally withdrawn in 1932. The locomotive was named after Achilles, a Greek hero.
- Buffalo (1872–1892) GWR no. 2160
  This locomotive was converted to standard gauge and worked in this form as no. 1320. It was named after an animal, the buffalo.
- Camel (1872–1892) GWR no. 2162
  This locomotive was converted to standard gauge and worked in this form as no. 1322. It was named after an animal, the camel.
- Dromedary (1873–1892) GWR no. 2166
  This locomotive was converted to standard gauge and worked in this form as no. 1325. It was named after a species of camel, the dromedary.
- Elephant (1872–1892) GWR no. 2161
  This locomotive was converted to standard gauge and worked in this form as no. 1321. It was named after an animal, the elephant.
- Python (1874–1892) GWR no. 2168
  Converted to standard gauge and worked in this form as no. 1318. Rather than being named after a snake, Python was named after the Greek mythological creature, the Python.
- Vulcan (1874–1892) GWR no. 2169
  Vulcan worked the last train on the Falmouth branch on 20 May 1892 before it was converted to standard gauge. The locomotive itself was also converted to standard gauge and worked in this form as no. 1319. The locomotive was named after Vulcan, a Roman god.

=== Cornwall Railway ===
- Dragon (1873–1892) GWR no. 2164
  Converted to standard gauge and worked in this form as no. 1323. The locomotive was named after the dragon, a kind of mythological animal.
- Emperor (1873–1892) GWR no. 2167
  Converted to standard gauge and worked in this form as no. 1317 until 1905 when it was sold to the South Wales Mineral Railway and became their no. 6, later returning to the Great Western Railway and running as no. 817 until finally withdrawn in 1926. For other uses of the name, see Emperor (disambiguation).
- Hercules (1872–1889) GWR no. 2163
  The locomotive was named after Hercules, a Roman hero.
