= South Devon Railway Leopard class =

Leopard
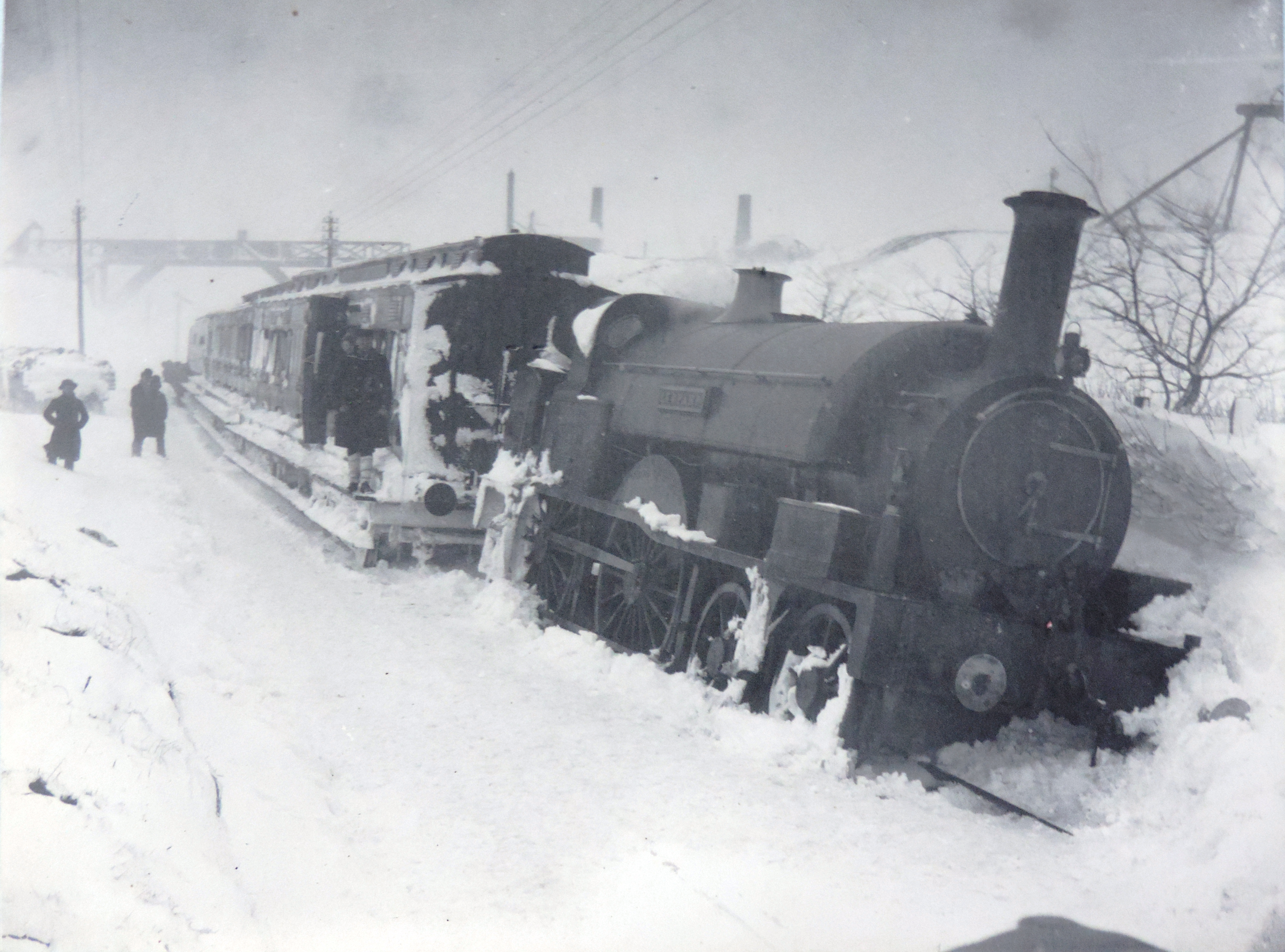
- Leopard derailed in snow near Camborne, 8 March 1891
Type and origin
- Power type: Steam
- Builder: Avonside Engine Co.
- Serial number: 894–895, 1050–1051
- Build date: 1872 (2), 1875 (2)
Specifications
- Configuration
  - Whyte: 4-4-0ST
- Gauge: 7 ft 1/4 in (2,140 mm)
- Leading dia.: 3 ft 6 in (1.07 m)
- Driver dia.: 5 ft 9 in (1.75 m)
- Wheelbase: 18 ft 5 in (5.61 m)
- Water cap.: 1,100 imp gal (5,000 L; 1,300 US gal)
- Cylinder size: 17 in × 24 in (430 mm × 610 mm)
Career
- Operators: South Devon Railway; Great Western Railway
- Class: Leopard

The Leopard class were four 4-4-0ST broad gauge locomotives designed for passenger trains but were also used on goods trains when required. They were built by the Avonside Engine Company for the South Devon Railway, but also operated on its associated railways. Although designed for easy conversion to standard gauge this was never carried out.

On 1 February 1876 the South Devon Railway was amalgamated with the Great Western Railway, the locomotives were given numbers by their new owners but continued to carry their names too.

== Locomotives ==
- Lance (1875 – 1892) GWR no. 2130
  It was one of two locomotives kept working at Swindon Works for shunting the broad gauge stock into the workshops for conversion or dismantling, until it was dismantled in June 1893. This was the second South Devon Railway locomotive to carry this name, it was previously carried by a Comet class locomotive.
- Leopard (1872 – 1893) GWR no. 2128
  It was one of two locomotives kept working at Swindon Works for shunting the broad gauge stock into the workshops for conversion or dismantling, until it too was dismantled in June 1893. On 8 March 1891, Leopard was derailed in a blizzard near Camborne, Cornwall whilst working a relief passenger train.
- Osiris (1875 – 1892) GWR no. 2131
  Named after the ancient Egyptian god Osiris, this was the second South Devon Railway locomotive to carry this name, it was previously carried by a Comet class locomotive.
- Stag (1872 – 1893) GWR no. 2129
  This locomotive is believed to have worked the last train on the St Ives branch on 20 May 1892 before this and all other lines were converted to standard gauge. It then took the empty coaches from there to Swindon Works where it was kept for shunting the broad gauge stock into the workshops for conversion or dismantling, until it too was dismantled in June 1893.
