= South Devon Railway locomotive Taurus =

British broad gauge 0-6-0ST locomotive

Taurus
Type and origin
- Power type: Steam
- Builder: Avonside Engine Company
Specifications
- Configuration
  - Whyte: 0-6-0ST
- Gauge: 7 ft (2,134 mm)
- Driver dia.: 3 ft 0 in (0.91 m)
- Wheelbase: 12 ft 0 in (3.66 m)
- Cylinder size: 12 1/2 in × 16 in (320 mm × 410 mm)
Career
- Operators: South Devon Railway, Great Western Railway
- Class: Taurus

Taurus was an 0-6-0ST broad gauge locomotive operated by the South Devon Railway.

It was a very different locomotive to all the other 0-6-0s used on the South Devon Railway. It was much smaller and was normally used on one of the branches, where it would regularly work passenger trains, or on the dockside lines in the Plymouth area. It was built by the Avonside Engine Company and was a saddle tank similar to 2-4-0 Prince.

On 1 February 1876 the South Devon Railway was amalgamated with the Great Western Railway, all its locomotives were given numbers by their new owners but continued to carry their names too. After the gauge conversion on 21 May 1892 Taurus was unused for a while but in 1894 it was converted to standard gauge and worked in this form as no. 1326 until 1905.

== Locomotive ==
- Taurus (1869 – 1892) GWR no. 2170
  The name comes from the Greek word for bull and represents a constellation. See Taurus (constellation).
