= South Devon Railway Remus class =

Type and origin
- Power type: Steam
- Builder: Avonside Engine Company
- Serial number: 661–662
- Build date: 1866
- Total produced: 2
Specifications
- Configuration
  - Whyte: 0-6-0ST
  - UIC: C n2t
- Gauge: 7 ft 1/4 in (2,140 mm)
- Driver dia.: 4 ft 9 in (1.448 m)
- Wheelbase: 15 ft 4 in (4.67 m)
- Fuel type: Coal
- Cylinders: Two, inside
- Cylinder size: 16 1/2 in × 24 in (419 mm × 610 mm)
Career
- Operators: South Devon Railway; → Great Western Railway
- Class: Remus
- Withdrawn: 1886, 1892
- Disposition: Both scrapped

The two Remus class locomotives were 0-6-0ST broad gauge locomotives operated by the South Devon Railway, England. They were ordered for working goods trains on the West Cornwall Railway but were also used on passenger trains.

The two Remus class locomotives were similar to the Dido class but with slightly larger wheels. They were built by the Avonside Engine Company.

On 1 February 1876 the South Devon Railway was amalgamated with the Great Western Railway, the locomotives were given numbers by their new owners but continued to carry their names.

== Locomotives ==
- Remus (Avonside 662 of 1866); GWR no. 2154; withdrawn 1886
- Romulus (Avonside 661 of 1866); GWR no. 2155; withdrawn 1892

The names, like many other locomotives of this era, came from classical mythology. Romulus and Remus were the traditional founders of Rome.
