= South Devon Railway 2-4-0 locomotives =

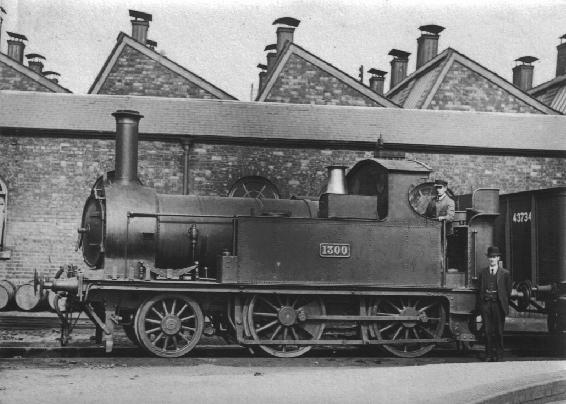
GWR 1300 was completed as a side tank rather than a saddle tank locomotive

The South Devon Railway 2-4-0 locomotives were small 2-4-0T broad gauge locomotives operated on the South Devon Railway, mainly on its branch lines such as that to Ashburton.

On 1 February 1876, the South Devon Railway was amalgamated with the Great Western Railway. The locomotives were given numbers by their new owners, but continued to carry their names as well.

== Locomotives ==
=== King ===
King
Type and origin
- Power type: Steam
- Builder: Avonside Engine Co.
Specifications
- Configuration
  - Whyte: 2-4-0T
- Gauge: 7 ft (2,134 mm)
- Leading dia.: 2 ft 6 in (762 mm)
- Driver dia.: 3 ft 0 in (914 mm)
- Wheelbase: 9 ft 6 in (2,896 mm)
- Cylinder size: 9 in (229 mm) dia × 16 in (406 mm) stroke

- King (1871–1878) GWR No. 2171

King was a small side-tank locomotive built by the Avonside Engine Company. It did not last long as a broad gauge locomotive, being converted to narrow gauge in 1878. It then operated in this form until 1907 as GWR No. 2, after which it was sold to the Bute Works Supply Company.

Named after a monarch, see King.

=== Prince ===
Prince
Type and origin
- Power type: Steam
- Builder: Ince Forge Company
- Build date: June 1871
Specifications
- Configuration
  - Whyte: 2-4-0ST
- Gauge: 7 ft (2,134 mm)
- Leading dia.: 3 ft 0 in (914 mm)
- Driver dia.: 4 ft 0 in (1,219 mm)
- Wheelbase: 12 ft 0 in (3,658 mm)
- Cylinder size: 12 in (305 mm) dia × 17 in (432 mm) stroke

- Prince (1871–1892) GWR No. 2137

Prince was similar to 0-6-0 Taurus, a small 2-4-0ST engine built by the Ince Forge Company three years earlier, works number 14 according to RCTS. It was converted to standard gauge in 1893 and operated in this form as GWR No. 1316 until 1899, after which it was used as a stationary engine and portable boiler at various locations including Crofton, Portreath, and Dorchester prisoner-of-war camp until finally dismantled in 1935.

For other uses of the name Prince, see Prince (disambiguation).

- Jupiter
- Mercury
- Saturn

Three more locomotives were under construction in 1876 when the South Devon Railway was amalgamated into the Great Western Railway. They were similar to Prince except for slightly smaller 11 1/2 in (292 mm) dia × 17 in (432 mm) cylinders.

The parts had been supplied by the Ince Forge Company for erection at Newton Abbot. Following the GWR's takeover, the partially-built locomotives were taken to Swindon railway works, where they were completed as side-tank locomotives 1298, 1299 and 1300. 1299 was fitted with a crane for work at Swindon in 1881 (withdrawn September 1936), while the other two were stationed at Exeter for working the Culm Valley Light Railway and withdrawn in 1926 (1298) and 1934 (1300).

The names are those of planets but were probably chosen for their mythological links, as many other South Devon Railway locomotives carried the names of gods. See Saturn, Mercury, Jupiter.
