= GWR Sir Watkin Class =

Class of British steam locomotives

Sir Watkin Class
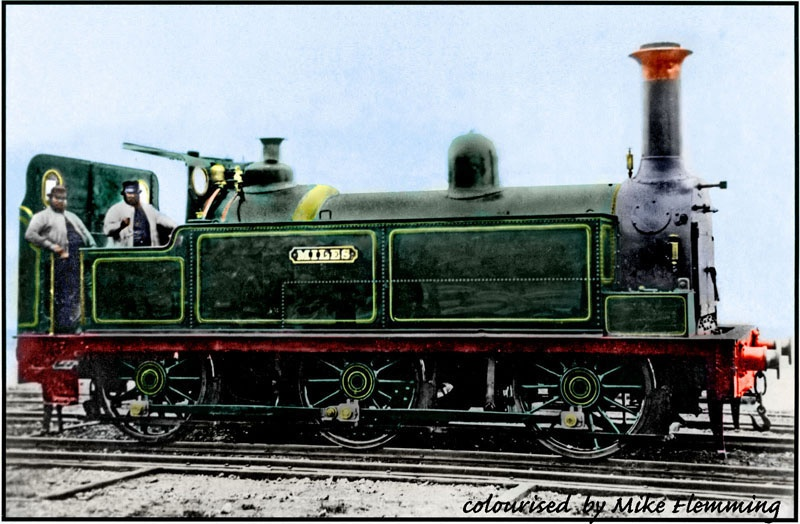
Type and origin
- Power type: Steam
- Designer: Joseph Armstrong
- Builder: Great Western Railway
Specifications
- Configuration
  - Whyte: 0-6-0T
- Gauge: 7 ft 1/4 in (2,140 mm)
- Driver dia.: 4 ft 6 in (1,372 mm)
- Wheelbase: 15 ft 6 in (4,724 mm)
- Cylinder size: 17 in × 24 in (432 mm × 610 mm), dia × stroke
Career
- Operators: Great Western Railway
- Class: Sir Watkin

The Great Western Railway Sir Watkin Class were 0-6-0T broad gauge steam locomotives. They were designed for working goods trains through to the underground Metropolitan Railway in London. This class was introduced into service between December 1865 and the last was withdrawn at the end of the GWR broad gauge in May 1892. They were all named after directors and senior officers of the railway.

Three locomotives (Bulkeley, Fowler and Saunders) were sold to the South Devon Railway in June 1872, but returned to the GWR when that railway was absorbed in 1876, when they were given numbers 2157–2159.

== Locomotives ==
- Bulkeley (1865 - 1872)
  This locomotive was named after Captain Bulkeley, a long-standing director of the railway. It was sold to the South Devon Railway in June 1872 where it was rebuilt with a saddle tank, but returned to the GWR when the SDR was absorbed in 1876. In the meantime, the same name had been given to a GWR Iron Duke Class locomotive, so the railway now had two locomotives with the same name. In common with other ex-SDR locomotives it was given a number (2157) in addition to its name.
- Fowler (1866 - 1887)
  This locomotive was given its name to commemorate John Fowler, the company's consulting engineer. It was sold to the South Devon Railway in June 1872 where it was rebuilt with a saddle tank, but returned to the GWR when the SDR was absorbed in 1876. It was then carried number 2158 in addition to its name.
- Miles (1866 - 1888)
  This locomotive was named after J. W. Miles, a long-standing director of the railway company.
- Saunders (1866 - 1892)
  This locomotive was named after Charles Saunders, the long-serving company secretary of the Great Western Railway. It was sold to the South Devon Railway in June 1872 where it was rebuilt with a saddle tank, but returned to the GWR when the SDR was absorbed in 1876, when it was given number 2159 in addition to its name.
- Sir Watkin (1866 - 1892)
  This locomotive was named after Sir Watkin Williams-Wynn, MP, the owner of Wynnstay near Ruabon and a director of the Great Western Railway. It has been suggested that this locomotive may have been renamed Wynn in 1869. The name Sir Watkin was given to a standard-gauge 2-2-2, no. 471 of the Sir Daniel class, which had been built in 1869.
- Whetham (1866 - 1889)
  This locomotive was named after Charles Whetham, a director of the railway company. Sir Charles Whetham was Lord Mayor of London 1878.
