= Avonside Engine Company =

Former English locomotive manufacturer

Avonside Engine Co.
- Formerly: Henry Stothert & Co. (1837–1840); Stothert, Slaughter & Co. (1840–1856); Slaughter, Grüning & Co. (1856-1864)
- Type: Private limited company (from 1864)
- Industry: Shipbuilding, marine engineering, ship repair
- Founded: 1837
- Founder: Henry Asprey Stothert
- Defunct: 1934
- Fate: Wound up
- Headquarters: Avonside Ironworks, St Philip's, Bristol, England; Avonside Locomotive Works, Fishponds, Bristol, England
- Key people: Henry Stothert (original founder, 1837); Edward Slaughter (partner, 1840-1864); Henry Grüning (partner, 1856-1864)
- Products: Steam locomotives, steam engines

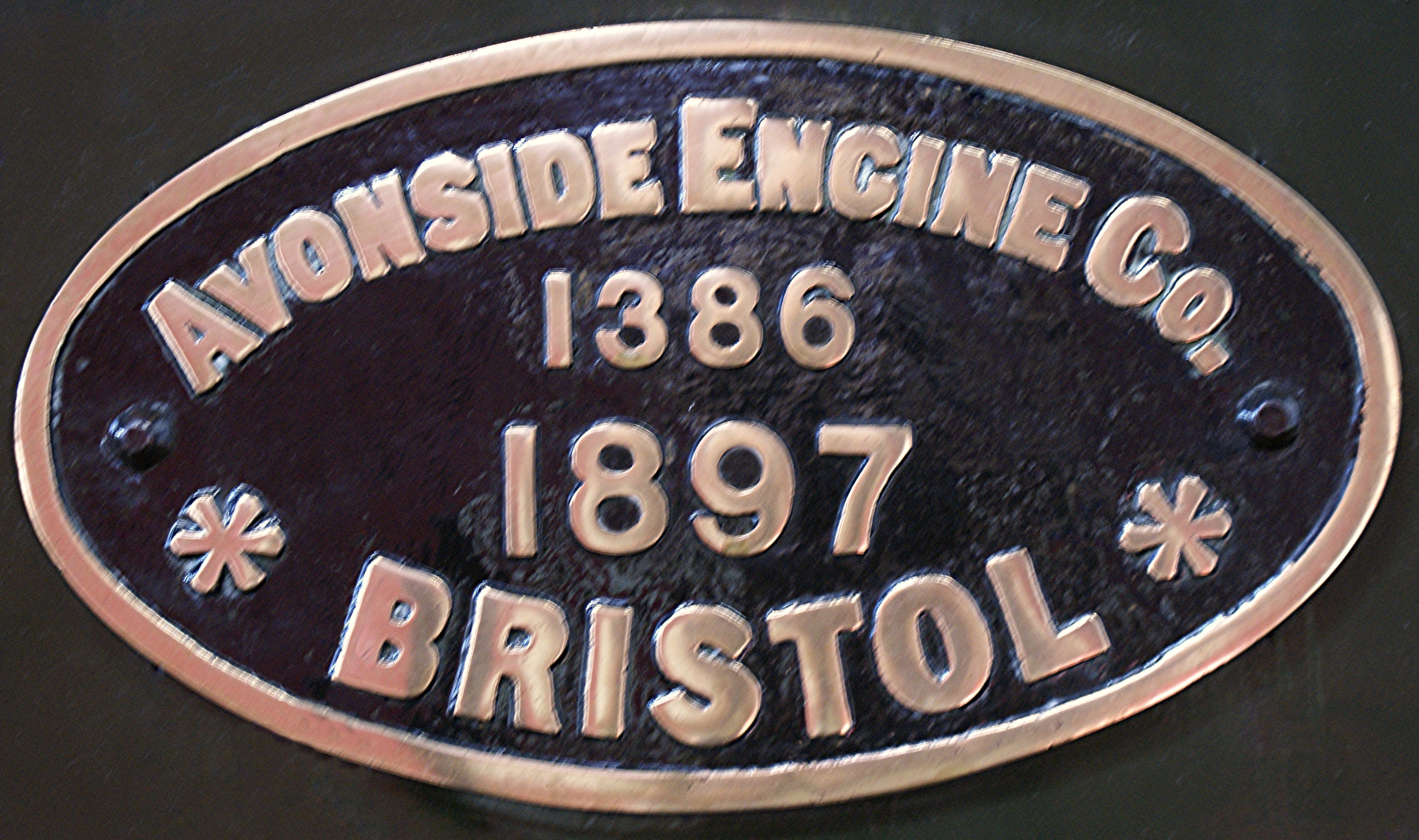

The Avonside Engine Company was a locomotive manufacturer in Avon Street, St Philip's, Bristol, England. The business originated in 1837 under the name of Henry Stothert and Company, and was reorganised twice before assuming the Avonside name in 1864.The company was wound up in 1934.

== Origins ==
The firm was originally started by Henry Stothert in 1837 as Henry Stothert and Company. Henry was the son of George Stothert (senior), founder of the nearby Bath engineering firm of Stothert & Pitt. Henry's brother, also named George, was manager of the same firm.

The company was given an order for two broad gauge (7 ft (2,134 mm)) 2-2-2 Firefly class express passenger engines Arrow and Dart, with 7 ft (2.1 m) driving wheels, delivered for the opening of the Great Western Railway (GWR) from Bristol to Bath on 31 August 1840. This was soon followed by an order for eight smaller 2-2-2 Sun class engines with 6 ft (1.8 m) driving wheels.

=== Stothert, Slaughter and Company ===
Edward Slaughter joined the company in 1840, when it became known as Stothert, Slaughter and Company. By 1844 their works were named "Avonside Ironworks". In 1846 built Avalanche the first of five six-coupled saddle tank banking engines for the GWR. The year 1846 also saw the delivery of six 2-2-2 tender locomotives for the opening of the Waterford and Limerick Railway in Ireland. Another large order came for ten broad gauge passenger 4-2-2s with 7 ft 6 in drivers and eight goods engines from the Bristol and Exeter Railway for the independent operation of that line from 1 May 1849.

During 1843, the company built and launched its first ship, the screw driven iron hulled steam packet Avon. This was followed by three more vessels (Severn, Mitau and Crete) across 1844 and 1845. In 1851 the company leased a shipbuilding yard, of which Henry Stothert took charge as a separate undertaking; by 1854 this was being run as a separate company by his nephew George Kelson Stothert in partnership with E.T. Fripp (1855–1856), F.J. Dickinson (briefly during 1856) and then G.P. Marten (1859–1862). By 1862 Stothert had sole control and the company was operating as G.K. Stothert & Co.

=== Slaughter, Grüning and Company ===
In 1856 Henry Grüning became a partner of Edward Slaughter at the locomotive works, which then became Slaughter, Grüning and Company.

== Avonside Engine Company Ltd ==
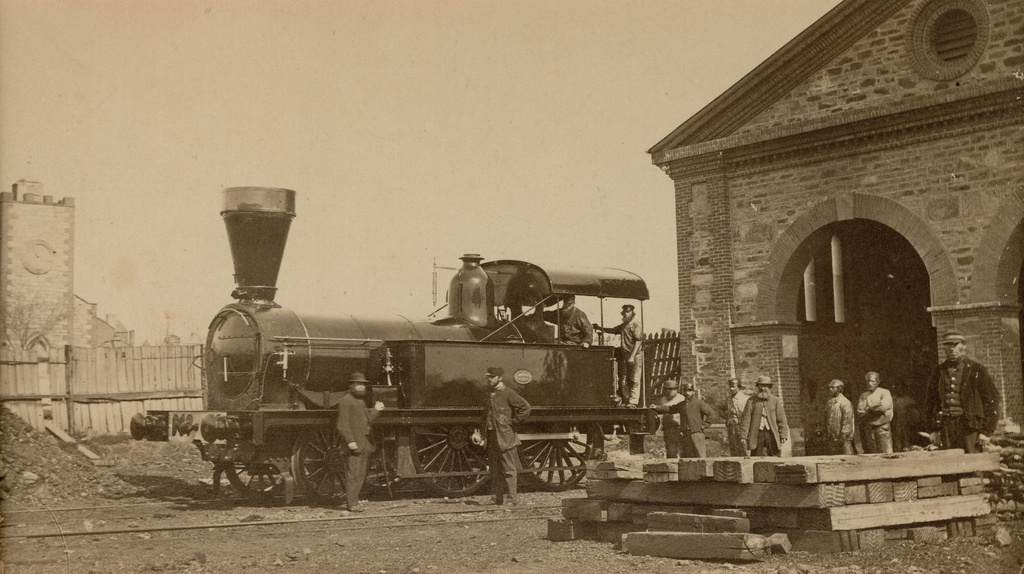
E class locomotive no. 14, one of six built for the South Australian Railways between 1862 and 1882

In 1864, the time-limited partnership came to an end and the company took advantage of the Companies Acts and became the Avonside Engine Company Ltd, with Edward Slaughter still as managing director. Henry Grüning continued his involvement by becoming a director. At this time, the works received a large order (the first from the GWR for some years following the development of Swindon Works) for twenty 2-4-0 Hawthorn class engines with 6 ft drivers.

The Avonside Engine Company and its predecessors were unusual in that most of the production before 1880 consisted of main line locomotives largely for British railway companies but also for export. However, by 1881 main line locomotives were getting much bigger and exceeding the capacity of the manufacturing equipment. They made a positive decision to concentrate on smaller industrial railway locomotives within the capacity of the existing plant. In part, this change was forced on the company as a result of financial difficulties following Edward Slaughter's death. Edwin Walker of the Bristol Engineering firm Fox, Walker & Co. joined Avonside and endeavoured to turn the company round, but without success.

In 1899 the company built three 4-6-0s designed by David Jones (railway) for the short-lived North Mount Lyell Railway.

=== Re-organisation ===
Walker was forced to liquidate the old company and form a new one with the same name to carry on the same business at the same address. At about this time, the old firm of Fox, Walker & Co. was taken over by Thomas Peckett and became Peckett and Sons.

=== Move to Fishponds ===
In 1905 the Avonside firm left its historic home at St Philips for a new plant at Fishponds but still with a small locomotive policy.

=== Closure ===
The company entered voluntary liquidation in 1934. The goodwill and designs of the company were bought in 1935 by the Hunslet Engine Company.

== Locomotive types ==
During the 1860s and 1870s, the company built broad-gauge and standard-gauge locomotives, large and small, for many companies in Britain and overseas. Detailed company records from this period have not survived.

=== Fairlie ===
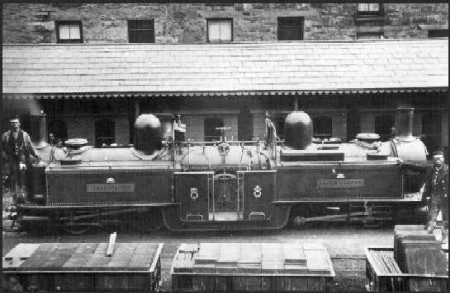
Fairlie locomotive James Spooner built for the Ffestiniog Railway in 1872

The company was the largest British builder of the Fairlie articulated locomotive. Among the first to be built at Bristol was James Spooner, in 1872, for the Ffestiniog Railway. Made to the same basic design as the remarkably successful Little Wonder, constructed by George England and Co. in 1869, it incorporated many detailed improvements and became the prototype for subsequent Ffestiniog Railway engines built in that company's works at Boston Lodge.

In 1872, on the recommendation of Sir Charles Fox and Sons, Avonside built two large 42-ton 0-6-6-0T Fairlies for shipment to Canada, one each to the Toronto, Grey and Bruce Railway and the Toronto and Nipissing Railway. The Avonside Works manager at the time these locomotives were built was Alfred Sacré, the brother of Charles Sacré, Locomotive Engineer of the Manchester Sheffield & Lincolnshire Railway. Alfred Sacré trained under Archibald Sturrock at the Doncaster plant of the Great Northern Railway and in 1872 moved from Avonside to the Yorkshire Engine Company, Sheffield, where he built more Fairlie types.

Avonside locomotives were exported also to Uruguay, where two 1874 Fairlie type locomotives worked in the Ferrocarril y Tranvía del Norte, at Montevideo.

In 1874, New Zealand Railways ordered two types of double Fairlie locomotives from the company. Both the B class and E class double Fairlies were fitted with Walschaerts valve gear. This was the first use of this technology to be used in New Zealand, and is possibly the first time a British manufacturer supplied it. The B class lasted in service until the late 1880s. The E class were officially written off in 1899, but most were still in use during the First World War.

An 0-4-4T single Fairlie was built for the Swindon, Marlborough and Andover Railway in 1878. This was the first British-based locomotive to use Walschaerts valve gear, which fitted entirely outside the wheelsets, leaving the space between the frames clear for the boiler.

In 1878–1879, on the recommendation of Robert Fairlie, Avonside built the R class of 18 0-6-4T single Fairlies for the New Zealand Government Railways. One, single Fairlie number 28 (of 1878) survives at Reefton.

=== Locomotives for the Rimutaka incline ===
In 1875 the company built four powerful tank locomotives designed by a Swedish engineer, H.W. Widmark, to operate on the Fell mountain railway system on the Rimutaka Incline in the North Island of New Zealand. These and two later locomotives of very similar design, built by Neilson and Company, handled the entire traffic for 80 years until the opening of the five mile (8 km) long base tunnel in 1955. Widmark was an inventive engineer who patented a design of steam-operated cylinder cocks which were of great use to Avonside on articulated locomotives since they dispensed with mechanical linkages.

=== 4-6-0 types ===
Avonside was a very early British builder of tender locomotives with a 4-6-0 wheel arrangement. Ten such narrow-gauge freight-hauling locomotives, weighing from 20 to 25 tons, were supplied to the Toronto, Grey and Bruce Railway and the Toronto and Nipissing Railway. These very successful, reliable wood-burning locomotives pre-dated the first significant British domestic railway 4-6-0, the "Jones Goods", by more than 20 years.

=== Saddle tanks ===
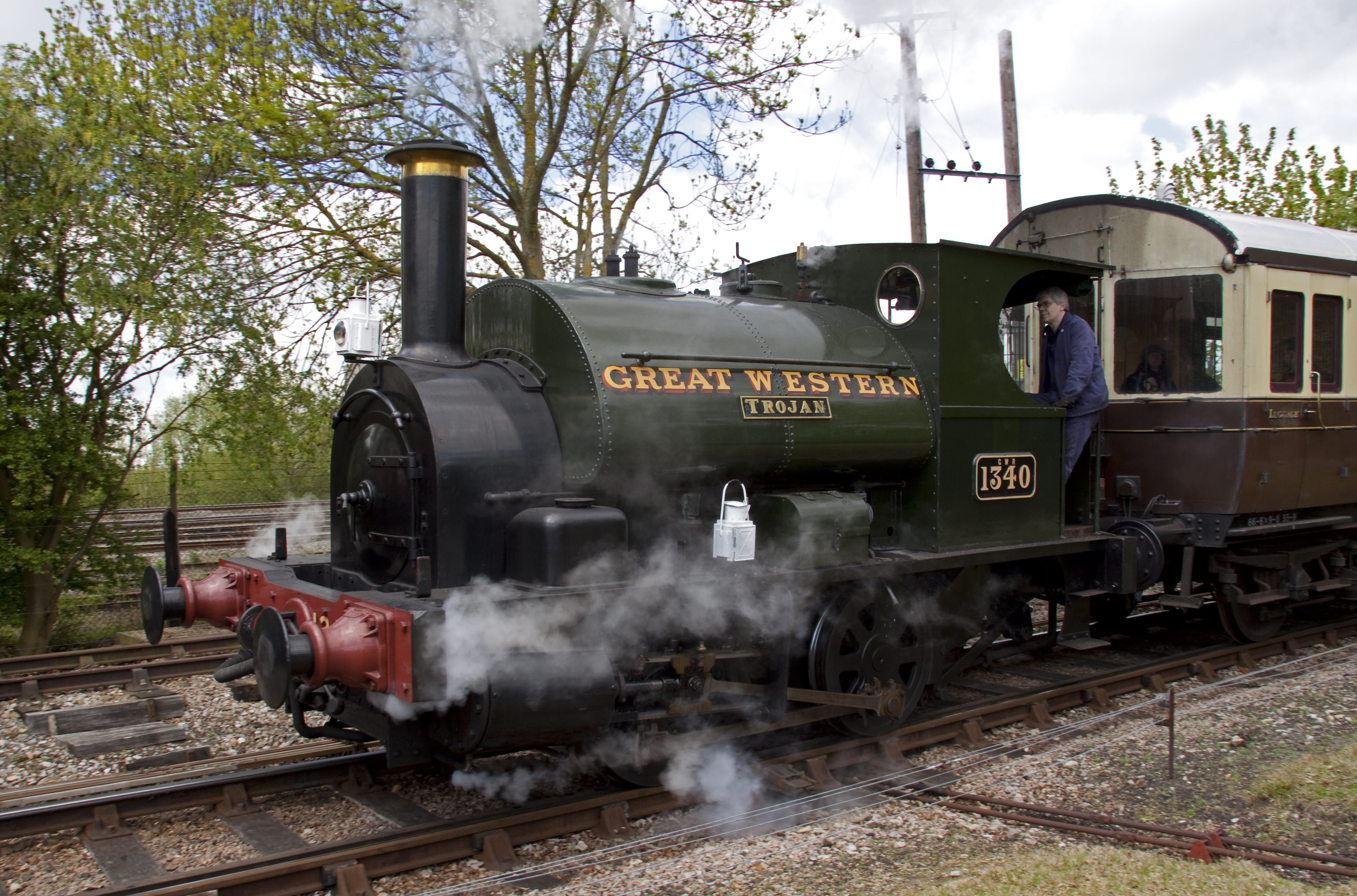
0-4-0ST locomotive no.1340 at Didcot

Between 1880 and 1930, Avonside are best remembered for their construction of 0-4-0ST and 0-6-0ST saddle-tank locomotives for industrial and dock-shunting purposes.

=== Internal combustion ===
Avonside produced their first "oil motor" locomotive in 1913. Diesel and petrol powered locomotives were included in the company's range until 1935.

== Preservation ==
Globally, 63 Avonside locomotives were preserved as of 2025.

=== United Kingdom ===
The Industrial Railway Society recorded 34 Avonside locomotives extant in the United Kingdom in as of 2008.

Avonside Engine Company locomotives preserved in the UK include:

- Cadbury No. 1, an 0-4-0T of 1925. Coke-fired for cleanliness, it worked on the Bournville Works Railway its entire life. Donated by Cadbury plc to the Birmingham Railway Museum in Tyseley in 1976, it is presently stored awaiting restoration on the Gloucestershire Warwickshire Railway at Toddington.
- IW&D 34 "Portbury" 0-6-0ST works number 1964 at Bristol Harbour Railway
- "Stamford" 0-6-0ST works number 1972 at the Rutland Railway Museum
- GWR No. 1340 "Trojan" 0-4-0ST works number 1386 at the Didcot Railway Centre
- "Woolmer" 0-6-0ST, ex-Longmoor Military Railway, preserved at Milestones Museum, Basingstoke
- Barrington an 0-4-0ST locomotive at Rutland Railway Museum
- No. 1798 0-6-0ST "Edwin Hulse", preserved and undergoing overhaul at the Avon Valley railway.

=== Ireland ===
- 3 ft (914 mm) gauge 0-6-0T "Nancy" in working order at the Cavan and Leitrim Railway.
- Londonderry Port and Harbour Commissioners No.3 "R.H. Smyth" 0-6-0ST works number 2021 at the Railway Preservation Society of Ireland Whitehead.

=== New Zealand ===
Avonside Engine Company locomotives preserved in New Zealand include:

- R 28 – 1217 of 1878 (single Fairlie) Reefton
- H 199 – 1075 of 1875 (Fell type) Fell Locomotive Museum, Featherston
- L 207/507 – 1205 of 1877 Museum of Transport and Technology, Auckland
- L 208/508 – 1206 of 1877 Shantytown, Greymouth
- L 219/509 – 1207 of 1877 Silver Stream Railway, Wellington.

=== Brazil ===
Avonside Engine Company locomotives preserved in Brazil include:

- Avonside #1047 from 1873, metre gauge (3' 3 3/8"), 4-4-0T Usina Amália #3. Operated originally at EFY, then at USY, SRy and EFS, from where it was sold to Usina Amália in Santa Rosa de Viterbo, SP. Today she's operational at LP Assessoria Industrial in Votorantim, SP
- Avonside #1244 from 1879, metre gauge (3' 3 3/8"), 4-4-0T EFS #23. Operated originally at EFY, then at USY, SRy and EFS, from where it was sold to Usina Santa Lina in Quatá, SP. Today she's operational at Paraguaçu Paulista, SP, railway museum.

=== Belgium ===
- Avonside Engine co.ltd #1908 "Fred" from 1925. Operated originally at Buxton Lime works with #RS16. Today's she's operational at Stoomcentrum Maldegem.

=== Taiwan ===
- Avonside Engine Co 835 of 1871. It was used initially on the Shinbashi–Yokohama line – the first railway line in Japan. In 1901 it was moved to Formosa (now Taiwan) where it was in service until 1926. It is now on display with another locomotive enclosed in a transparent case at the 228 Peace Memorial Park. It is likely to be the oldest surviving Avonside locomotive.

== See also ==
- Avonside Locomotive Works

== Sources ==
- Industrial Locomotive Society (1967). Steam locomotives in industry. David and Charles.
- Lowe, J.W. (1989). British Steam Locomotive Builders. Guild Publishing.
- L.T.C. Rolt (1964). A Hunslet Hundred. David & Charles. Avonside Engine Company – pages 102–116.
- Reed, P. J. T. (February 1953). White, D. E. (ed.). The Locomotives of the Great Western Railway, Part 2: Broad Gauge. Kenilworth: RCTS. ISBN 0-901115-32-0. OCLC 650490992.
- Rowland A S Abbott (1970). The Fairlie Locomotive. Newton Abbot: David & Charles.
- Rod Clarke (2007). Narrow Gauge Through the Bush – Ontario's Toronto Grey & Bruce and Toronto and Nipissing Railways. Streetsville, Ontario: Beaumont and Clarke with the Credit Valley Railway Company.
- Shepherd, Ernie (2009). The Atock/Attock Family: A Worldwide Railway Engineering Dynasty. Vol. 150. Oakwood Library of Railway History. ISBN 978-0853616818.
