= Talbot (surname) =

- Arms of Talbot: gules, a lion or, waved bordure or
- Pronunciation: UK: /ˈtɔːlbət, ˈtɒlbət/ US: /ˈtælbət/
- Language: English

Origin
- Language: Norman
- Origin: Germanic languages: tal + bod
- Meaning: 'messenger of destruction'
- Region of origin: England, French Canada

Other names
- Variant forms: Talbott, Talbut, Talbut, Taulbut
- Cognate: French: Talabot

Talbot is an English Norman–origin surname. Notable people with the name include:

- Albert Talbot (1877–1936), Anglican Dean of Sydney
- Andre Talbot (born 1978), Canadian football player
- Antonio Talbot (1900–1980), Canadian politician
- Arthur Newell Talbot (1857–1942), American civil engineer
- Billy Talbot (born 1943), American singer-songwriter
- Brian Talbot (born 1953), English footballer
- Bryan Talbot (born 1952), British comic book artist
- Cam Talbot (born 1987), Canadian ice hockey goaltender
- Charles Talbot, 1st Baron Talbot of Hensol (1685–1737), British lawyer and politician
- Charles Talbot, 1st Duke of Shrewsbury (1660–1718), English politician
- Christopher Rice Mansel Talbot (1803–1890), Welsh industrialist and politician
- Colin Talbot (born 1952), British political scientist professor
- Connie Talbot (born 2000), English singer
- D. Smith Talbot (1841–1915), American politician from Pennsylvania
- David Talbot (born 1951), American journalist
- David Talbot (golfer) (born 1936), English golfer
- Drew Talbot (born 1986), English footballer
- Don Talbot (1933–2020), Australian swimming coach
- Edward Allen Talbot (1796–1839), British-Canadian settler
- Edward Talbot (bishop) (1844–1934), English bishop of Rochester, Southwark then Winchester
- Edward Talbot, 8th Earl of Shrewsbury (1561–1617), English nobleman and politician
- Lady Eleanor Talbot (c. 1436 – 1468), English noblewoman
- Emily Charlotte Talbot (1840–1918), Welsh heiress and daughter of Christopher Rice Mansel Talbot
- Ethelbert Talbot (1848–1928), American bishop
- Frances Talbot, Countess of Morley (1782–1857), English author and artist
- Francis Talbot, 5th Earl of Shrewsbury (1500–1560), English nobleman
- Francis X. Talbot (1889–1953), American Jesuit publisher and academic administrator
- Frank Talbot (1930–2024), Australian ichthyologist, director of the Australian Museum
- Frank Talbot (theatre) (1866–1949), Australian impresario
- Fred Talbot (born 1949), British television presenter
- Geoffrey Talbot (died c. 1140), English nobleman
- George Talbot (disambiguation), several people, including several earls of Shrewsbury
- Gerald Talbot (born 1931), American politician
- Gilbert Talbot, 7th Earl of Shrewsbury (1552–1616), English aristocrat and politician
- Grover C. Talbot (1885–1935), American politician
- Henry Fox Talbot (1800–1877), British inventor and photography pioneer
- Hilary Talbot (1912–2004), British judge
- Isham Talbot (1773–1837), American politician
- James Talbot (disambiguation), several people
- Jean-Guy Talbot (1932–2024), Canadian ice hockey player
- Jean-Pierre Talbot (born 1943), Belgian actor
- Joby Talbot (born 1971), British classical composer
- Joe Talbot (filmmaker) (born 1991), American filmmaker
- Joe Talbot (singer) (born 1984), Welsh musician
- John Talbot (disambiguation), several people
- Kirk Talbot (born 1969), Louisiana politician
- Larry Talbot, titular character in the 1941 film The Wolf Man
- Les Talbot (1910–1983), English footballer
- Liam Talbot (born 1981), Australian racing driver
- Lyle Talbot (1902–1996), American actor
- Mary Talbot (disambiguation), several people
- Matt Talbot (1856–1925), Irish alcoholic who turned to Christianity
- Maxime Talbot (born 1984), Canadian ice hockey player
- Michael Talbot (disambiguation), several people
- Mick Talbot (born 1958), English keyboardist
- Mignon Talbot (1869–1950), American paleontologist
- Milo Talbot (British Army officer) (1854–1931)
- Milo Talbot, 7th Baron Talbot of Malahide (1912–1973)
- Montague Talbot (1774–1831), Irish actor and theatre manager
- Nita Talbot (born 1930), American actress
- P. H. Talbot (1897–1974), captain of the USS Helm
- Paul Talbot (born 1979), English professional footballer
- Peter Talbot (politician) (1854–1919), Canadian politician
- Archbishop Peter Talbot (c. 1618–1680), Catholic Archbishop of Dublin
- Philippe Adjutor Talbot (1879–1967), Canadian politician
- Phillips Talbot (1915–2010), American diplomat
- Rachel Talbot Ross (born 1961), American politician
- Ralph Talbot (1897–1918), US Marine flyer
- Richard Talbot, 1st Earl of Tyrconnell (1630–1691), Irish politician, courtier and soldier
- Richard Talbot (colonizer) (1772–1853), Irish settler in Upper Canada
- Rhisiart Tal-e-bot (born Richard Talbot, 1975), British political activist
- Scott Talbot (born 1981), Australian-born New Zealand swimmer and swimming coach
- Silas Talbot (1751–1813), captain of the USS Constitution
- Siobhán Talbot (born 1964), Irish businesswoman, CEO of Glanbia
- Stephanie Talbot (born 1994), Australian basketball player
- Thomas Talbot (Upper Canada) (1771–1853), Canadian politician
- Thomas Talbot (Massachusetts politician) (1818–1885), governor of Massachusetts
- Thomas Talbot, 2nd Viscount Lisle (c. 1449 – 1470), English nobleman
- William Talbot (bishop) (1658–1730), British Anglican bishop
- William Talbot, 1st Earl Talbot (1710–1782), English peer and politician

== Fictional characters ==
- Bela Talbot, a character from Supernatural_(American_TV_series)
- Chloe Talbot, a character from The Simpsons
- David Talbot (The Vampire Chronicles), a character from The Vampire Chronicles
- Glenn Talbot, a character in the Marvel Universe
- Larry Talbot, the protagonist of the film The Wolf Man
- Joe Talbot, a character in the children's TV series Wishbone
- Henry Talbot, a character in the TV series Downton Abbey and subsequent film

== Other uses ==
As a given name:

- Talbot Hobbs, Australian architect
- Talbot Mundy, writer of adventure stories
- Talbot Rothwell, English screenwriter

As an aristocratic family name, the Earls of Shrewsbury:

- John Talbot, 1st Earl of Shrewsbury (1390–1453)
- John Talbot, 2nd Earl of Shrewsbury (1413–1460)
- John Talbot, 3rd Earl of Shrewsbury (1448–1473)
- George Talbot, 4th Earl of Shrewsbury (1468–1538)
- Francis Talbot, 5th Earl of Shrewsbury (1500–1560)
- George Talbot, 6th Earl of Shrewsbury (1522–1590)
- Gilbert Talbot, 7th Earl of Shrewsbury (1552–1616)
- Edward Talbot, 8th Earl of Shrewsbury (1561–1617)
- George Talbot, 9th Earl of Shrewsbury (1567–1630)
- John Talbot, 10th Earl of Shrewsbury (1601–1654)
- Francis Talbot, 11th Earl of Shrewsbury (1623–1667)
- Charles Talbot, 1st Duke of Shrewsbury, 12th Earl of Shrewsbury (1660–1718) (became Duke in 1694, dukedom extinct 1718)
- Gilbert Talbot, 13th Earl of Shrewsbury (1673–1743)
- George Talbot, 14th Earl of Shrewsbury (1719–1787)
- Charles Talbot, 15th Earl of Shrewsbury (1753–1827)
- John Talbot, 16th Earl of Shrewsbury (1791–1852)
- Bertram Arthur Talbot, 17th Earl of Shrewsbury (1832–1856)
- Henry John Chetwynd-Talbot, 18th Earl of Shrewsbury, 3rd Earl Talbot (1803–1868)
- Charles John Chetwynd-Talbot, 19th Earl of Shrewsbury, 4th Earl Talbot (1830–1877)
- Charles Henry John Chetwynd-Talbot, 20th Earl of Shrewsbury, 5th Earl Talbot (1860–1921)
- John George Charles Henry Alton Alexander Chetwynd-Talbot, 21st Earl of Shrewsbury, 6th Earl Talbot (1914–1980)
- Charles Henry John Benedict Crofton Chetwynd Chetwynd-Talbot, 22nd Earl of Shrewsbury, 7th Earl Talbot (born 1952)
- his son and heir: James Chetwynd-Talbot, Viscount Ingestre (born 1978)

== See also ==
- Talbot (disambiguation)
- Baron Lisle, family name
- Baron Talbot of Hensol, Earl Talbot of Hensol, family name
- Baron Talbot of Malahide
- Talbut
