= Talbot (disambiguation) =

Talbot was a British-French automobile marque.

Talbot may also refer to:

== People ==
- Talbot (given name)
- Talbot (surname)

=== In peerages ===
- Earl Talbot
- Baron Talbot
- Baron Talbot of Malahide

== Places ==
- Talbot (ward), a former electoral ward of Trafford, Greater Manchester, England
- Port Talbot, a town in West Glamorgan, Wales, UK
- Talbot Lake (Petite rivière Pikauba), a lake crossed by Petite rivière Pikauba in Lac-Pikauba, Quebec, Canada
- Talbot, Alberta, an unincorporated community and ghost town in Canada
- Talbot, Indiana, a town in Indiana, U.S.
- Talbot, Michigan, an unincorporated community
- Talbot, Victoria, a town in Australia
  - Talbot railway station

== Science ==
- Talbot (crater), a lunar crater
- Talbot (unit), a non standard photometric unit of luminous energy
- Talbot cavity, an optical cavity
- Talbot effect, a near-field diffraction phenomenon

== Other ==
- Talbot (dog), an extinct white hunting dog
  - Talbot (heraldry), a heraldic dog
- Talbot School of Theology, an evangelical Christian theological seminary in La Mirada, California, U.S.
- HMS Talbot, the name of six ships of the Royal Navy
- USS Talbot, the name of three ships of the US Navy
- Château Talbot, Bordeaux wine producer, archaically named simply Talbot
- A house of Adams' Grammar School, Newport, Shropshire, UK
- Waggonfabrik Talbot, German rolling stock manufacturer, also known as Bombardier Talbot since being acquired by Bombardier GmbH
- Talbot wagon, common name for a type of self discharging railway wagon, originally developed by Waggonfabrik Talbot

== See also ==
- Talbot County (disambiguation)
- Talbot River (disambiguation)
- Talbots, a retail chain for women's clothing and accessories
