= George Talbot =

George Talbot may refer to:

- George Talbot, 4th Earl of Shrewsbury (c. 1468–1538)
- George Talbot, 6th Earl of Shrewsbury (1528–1590), English statesman
- George Talbot, 9th Earl of Shrewsbury (1566–1630), Roman Catholic priest
- Sir George Talbot, 3rd Baronet (1761–1850), English cricketer
- George Talbot (papal chamberlain) (1816–1886), Anglo-Irish Catholic convert and Vatican official
- George F. Talbot (1819–1907), Maine attorney and Solicitor of the United States Treasury
- George Talbot (mayor) (1834–1911), New Zealand local politician
- George Frederick Talbot (1859–1938), Justice of the Supreme Court of Nevada
- George Talbot (judge) (1861–1938), Judge of the High Court of Justice
- George Talbot (entomologist) (1882–1952), English entomologist who specialised in butterflies
- George S. Talbot (1875–1918), English composer and writer
- George Talbot (New Zealand cricketer) (1907–1943), New Zealand cricketer
- George H. Talbot (1911–1996), American businessman
