= Plym =

Plym may refer to:

- River Plym, Devon, England
- HMS Plym (K271), a frigate of Britain's Royal Navy
- Plym and Plym II, ferries of the Torpoint Ferry service in England
- Plym, a GWR Caliph Class locomotive in Britain

== See also ==
- Plim (disambiguation)
