= Psalm 62 =

Biblical psalm

- "Truly my soul waiteth upon God: from him cometh my salvation."
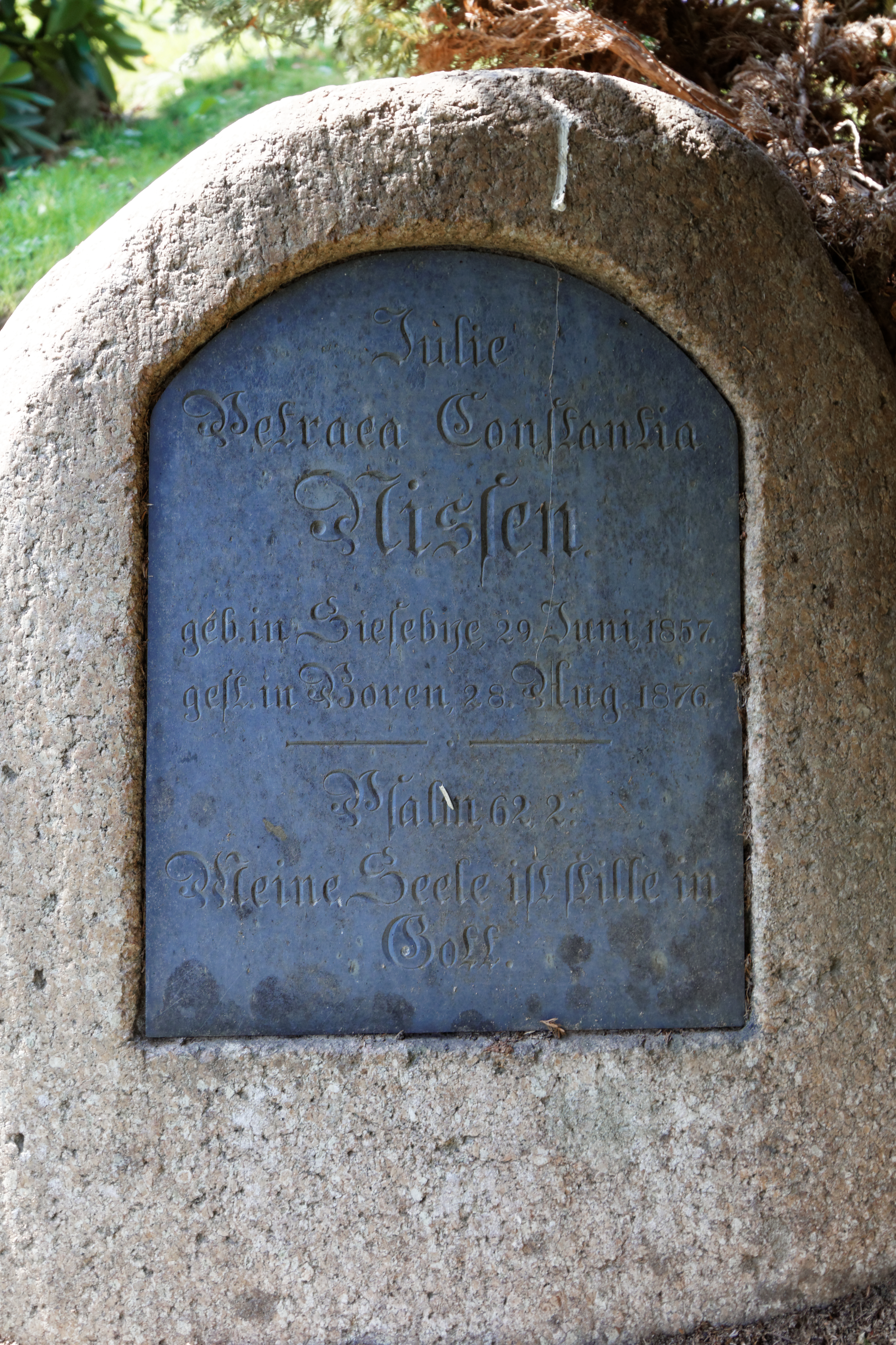
- Verse 5 in German, "My soul is still in God", on a gravestone
- Other name: Psalm 61 (Vulgate); "Nonne Deo subiecta erit anima mea"
- Language: Hebrew (original)

Psalm 62
- ← Psalm 61 Psalm 63 →
- Book: Book of Psalms
- Hebrew Bible part: Ketuvim
- Order in the Hebrew part: 1
- Category: Sifrei Emet
- Christian Bible part: Old Testament
- Order in the Christian part: 19

Psalm 62 is the 62nd psalm of the Book of Psalms, beginning in English in the King James Version: "Truly my soul waiteth upon God: from him cometh my salvation". The Book of Psalms is part of the third section of the Hebrew Bible, and a book of the Christian Old Testament. In the slightly different numbering system used in the Greek Septuagint version of the Bible and in the Latin Vulgate, this psalm is Psalm 61. In Latin, it is known as "Nonne Deo subiecta erit anima mea". The psalm offers a warning not to let one's power erode one's trust in God.

The psalm forms a regular part of Jewish, Catholic, Lutheran, Anglican and other Protestant liturgies. Verse 12 is quoted in the New Testament.

== Contents ==
Jeduthun's name stands at the head of this psalms, along with Psalms 39 and 77. In 1 Chronicles 16:41–42 he is one of the chief singers, and his sons were gatekeepers at the tent of the Ark of the Covenant. His name is mentioned, perhaps, as a special honour.

== Uses ==
=== New Testament ===
A phrase from verse 12, "for thou renderest to every man according to his work", which also occurs in Proverbs 24:12, is quoted in Matthew 16:27 and Romans 2:6 in the New Testament.

=== Book of Common Prayer ===
In the Church of England's Book of Common Prayer, this psalm is appointed to be read on the morning of the 12th day of the month.

=== Catholic Church ===
Until 1912, Psalm 62 was part of the Tenebrae liturgy during the Holy Week.

=== Silence ===
St. Norbet's Arts Center anchors its views on silence in verse 1, "For God alone my soul waits in silence; from him comes my salvation", from Psalm 62.

== Musical settings ==
Heinrich Schütz composed a choral setting of a metred paraphrase of Psalm 62 in German, "Mein Seel ist still in meinem Gott" (My soul is still in my God) in 1628 as part of the Becker Psalter.

Max Reger composed a paraphrase of Psalm 62, "Meine Seele ist still zu Gott" (My soul is still towards God) as the second of two sacred songs (Zwei geistliche Lieder) in German for voice (mezzo-soprano or baritone) and keyboard (organ or harmonium or piano), Op. 105, in 1907, the other being "Ich sehe dich in tausend Bildern" on a poem by Novalis. George S. Talbot composed a setting in English, "My soul rests in God alone". In 1921, a setting of three psalm settings by Max Gulbins was published as his Op. 109. They were written for a three-part women's choir and organ, containing Psalm 62 as "Meine Seele ist stille zu Gott", and also Psalms 13 and 141. In 1937, the Danish composer Vagn Holmboe set Psalm 62 for an unaccompanied children's choir. In 2000, Stephen McManus, composed a setting for unison choir, mixed choir, oboe and organ.

"Psalm 62" is a track of the album Pages, the fifth studio album by the 2007 contemporary worship duo Shane & Shane. The Philippine composer Joel P. Navarro wrote a hymn setting in English, "My Soul Finds Rest", to a melody by Arnel dC Aquino, in 2011.

== Text ==
The following table shows the Hebrew text of the Psalm with vowels, alongside the Koine Greek text in the Septuagint and the English translation from the King James Version. Note that the meaning can slightly differ between these versions, as the Septuagint and the Masoretic Text come from different textual traditions. (Note: A 1917 translation directly from Hebrew to English by the Jewish Publication Society can be found here or here, and an 1844 translation directly from the Septuagint by L. C. L. Brenton can be found here. Both translations are in the public domain.) In the Septuagint, this psalm is numbered Psalm 61.

#	Hebrew	English	Greek
(Note: In the Jewish verse numbering, the ascription of this psalm is verse 1, and the rest of the psalm begins from verse 2. However, the Christian verse numbering does not count the ascription.)	לַמְנַצֵּ֥חַ עַֽל־יְדוּת֗וּן מִזְמ֥וֹר לְדָוִֽד׃	(To the chief Musician, to Jeduthun, A Psalm of David.)	Εἰς τὸ τέλος, ὑπὲρ ᾿Ιδιθούν· ψαλμὸς τῷ Δαυΐδ. -
1	אַ֣ךְ אֶל־אֱ֭לֹהִים דּֽוּמִיָּ֣ה נַפְשִׁ֑י מִ֝מֶּ֗נּוּ יְשׁוּעָתִֽי׃	Truly my soul waiteth upon God: from him cometh my salvation.	ΟΥΧΙ τῷ Θεῷ ὑποταγήσεται ἡ ψυχή μου; παρ᾿ αὐτῷ γὰρ τὸ σωτήριόν μου·
2	אַךְ־ה֣וּא צ֭וּרִי וִישׁוּעָתִ֑י מִ֝שְׂגַּבִּ֗י לֹא־אֶמּ֥וֹט רַבָּֽה׃	He only is my rock and my salvation; he is my defence; I shall not be greatly moved.	καὶ γὰρ αὐτὸς Θεός μου καὶ σωτήρ μου, καὶ ἀντιλήπτωρ μου, οὐ μὴ σαλευθῶ ἐπὶ πλεῖον.
3	עַד־אָ֤נָה ׀ תְּה֥וֹתְת֣וּ עַל־אִישׁ֮ תְּרָצְּח֢וּ כֻ֫לְּכֶ֥ם כְּקִ֥יר נָט֑וּי גָּ֝דֵ֗ר הַדְּחוּיָֽה׃	How long will ye imagine mischief against a man? ye shall be slain all of you: as a bowing wall shall ye be, and as a tottering fence.	ἕως πότε ἐπιτίθεσθε ἐπ᾿ ἄνθρωπον; φονεύετε πάντες ὡς τοίχῳ κεκλιμένῳ καὶ φραγμῷ ὠσμένῳ.
4	אַ֤ךְ מִשְּׂאֵת֨וֹ ׀ יָ֥עֲצ֣וּ לְהַדִּיחַ֮ יִרְצ֢וּ כָ֫זָ֥ב בְּפִ֥יו יְבָרֵ֑כוּ וּ֝בְקִרְבָּ֗ם יְקַֽלְלוּ־סֶֽלָה׃	They only consult to cast him down from his excellency: they delight in lies: they bless with their mouth, but they curse inwardly. Selah.	πλὴν τὴν τιμήν μου ἐβουλεύσαντο ἀπώσασθαι, ἔδραμον ἐν δίψει, τῷ στόματι αὐτῶν εὐλόγουν καὶ τῇ καρδίᾳ αὐτῶν κατηρῶντο. (διάψαλμα).
5	אַ֣ךְ לֵ֭אלֹהִים דּ֣וֹמִּי נַפְשִׁ֑י כִּֽי־מִ֝מֶּ֗נּוּ תִּקְוָתִֽי׃	My soul, wait thou only upon God; for my expectation is from him.	πλὴν τῷ Θεῷ ὑποτάγηθι, ἡ ψυχή μου, ὅτι παρ᾿ αὐτῷ ἡ ὑπομονή μου.
6	אַךְ־ה֣וּא צ֭וּרִי וִישׁוּעָתִ֑י מִ֝שְׂגַּבִּ֗י לֹ֣א אֶמּֽוֹט׃	He only is my rock and my salvation: he is my defence; I shall not be moved.	ὅτι αὐτὸς Θεός μου καὶ σωτήρ μου, ἀντιλήπτωρ μου, οὐ μὴ μεταναστεύσω.
7	עַל־אֱ֭לֹהִים יִשְׁעִ֣י וּכְבוֹדִ֑י צוּר־עֻזִּ֥י מַ֝חְסִ֗י בֵּאלֹהִֽים׃	In God is my salvation and my glory: the rock of my strength, and my refuge, is in God.	ἐπὶ τῷ Θεῷ τὸ σωτήριόν μου καὶ ἡ δόξα μου· ὁ Θεὸς τῆς βοηθείας μου, καὶ ἡ ἐλπίς μου ἐπὶ τῷ Θεῷ.
8	בִּטְח֘וּ ב֤וֹ בְכׇל־עֵ֨ת ׀ עָ֗ם שִׁפְכֽוּ־לְפָנָ֥יו לְבַבְכֶ֑ם אֱלֹהִ֖ים מַֽחֲסֶה־לָּ֣נוּ סֶֽלָה׃	Trust in him at all times; ye people, pour out your heart before him: God is a refuge for us. Selah.	ἐλπίσατε ἐπ᾿ αὐτὸν πᾶσα συναγωγὴ λαοῦ· ἐκχέετε ἐνώπιον αὐτοῦ τὰς καρδίας ὑμῶν, ὅτι ὁ Θεὸς βοηθὸς ἡμῶν. (διάψαλμα).
9	אַ֤ךְ ׀ הֶ֥בֶל בְּנֵֽי־אָדָם֮ כָּזָ֢ב בְּנֵ֫י־אִ֥ישׁ בְּמֹאזְנַ֥יִם לַעֲל֑וֹת הֵ֝֗מָּה מֵהֶ֥בֶל יָֽחַד׃	Surely men of low degree are vanity, and men of high degree are a lie: to be laid in the balance, they are altogether lighter than vanity.	πλὴν μάταιοι οἱ υἱοὶ τῶν ἀνθρώπων, ψευδεῖς οἱ υἱοὶ τῶν ἀνθρώπων ἐν ζυγοῖς τοῦ ἀδικῆσαι αὐτοὶ ἐκ ματαιότητος ἐπὶ τὸ αὐτό.
10	אַל־תִּבְטְח֣וּ בְעֹשֶׁק֮ וּבְגָזֵ֢ל אַל־תֶּ֫הְבָּ֥לוּ חַ֤יִל ׀ כִּֽי־יָנ֑וּב אַל־תָּשִׁ֥יתוּ לֵֽב׃	Trust not in oppression, and become not vain in robbery: if riches increase, set not your heart upon them.	μὴ ἐλπίζετε ἐπ᾿ ἀδικίαν καὶ ἐπὶ ἁρπάγματα μὴ ἐπιποθεῖτε· πλοῦτος ἐὰν ῥέῃ, μὴ προστίθεσθε καρδίαν.
11	אַחַ֤ת ׀ דִּבֶּ֬ר אֱלֹהִ֗ים שְׁתַּֽיִם־ז֥וּ שָׁמָ֑עְתִּי כִּ֥י עֹ֝֗ז לֵֽאלֹהִֽים׃	God hath spoken once; twice have I heard this; that power belongeth unto God.	ἅπαξ ἐλάλησεν ὁ Θεός, δύο ταῦτα ἤκουσα, ὅτι τὸ κράτος τοῦ Θεοῦ,
12	וּלְךָֽ־אֲדֹנָ֥י חָ֑סֶד כִּֽי־אַתָּ֨ה תְשַׁלֵּ֖ם לְאִ֣ישׁ כְּֽמַעֲשֵֽׂהוּ׃	Also unto thee, O Lord, belongeth mercy: for thou renderest to every man according to his work.	καὶ σοῦ, Κύριε, τὸ ἔλεος, ὅτι σὺ ἀποδώσεις ἑκάστῳ κατὰ τὰ ἔργα αὐτοῦ.
