= Edward Talbot =

Edward Talbot may refer to:

- Edward Talbot, 8th Earl of Shrewsbury (1561–1617)
- Edward Kelley (1555–1597), also known as Edward Talbot, notorious English criminal and medium
- Edward Talbot (bishop) (1844–1934), Anglican bishop
- Edward Talbot (priest) (1693–1720), Archdeacon of Berkshire, son of William Talbot
- Edward Allen Talbot (1796–1839), immigrant to Upper Canada
- Edward Keble Talbot (1877–1949), English Anglican priest

== See also ==
- Edward Talbot Thackeray (1836–1927), British recipient of the Victoria Cross
