= Richard Talbot =

Richard Talbot may refer to:

- Richard Talbot, 1st Earl of Tyrconnell (1630–1691), Irish royalist and Jacobite soldier
- Richard Talbot (archbishop of Dublin) (c. 1390–1449), leading ecclesiastical and political figures in Ireland
- Richard Talbot (bishop of London) (died 1262), Dean of St Paul's, London and bishop-elect of London
- Richard Talbot (Irish judge) (c.1520-1577), judge of the Court of Common Pleas
- Richard Francis Talbot (1710–1752), Irish-French soldier and diplomat
- Richard Talbot (colonist) (1772–1853), Irish-Canadian
- Richard Talbot, 2nd Baron Talbot of Malahide (1766–1849), Anglo-Irish politician
- Richard Talbot, 2nd Baron Talbot (ca. 1306–1356), English nobleman
