= John Talbot =

John Talbot may refer to:

== Nobles ==
- John Talbot, 1st Earl of Shrewsbury (c. 1387–1453), military commander in the Hundred Years' War
- John Talbot, 2nd Earl of Shrewsbury (c. 1417–1460), English nobleman and soldier
- John Talbot, 3rd Earl of Shrewsbury (1448–1473), English nobleman
- John Talbot, 10th Earl of Shrewsbury (1601–1654), English nobleman
- John Talbot, 16th Earl of Shrewsbury (1791–1852), British peer and aristocrat
- John Talbot, 1st Viscount Lisle (1423–1453), English nobleman and soldier

== Politicians ==
- John Talbot (Leics MP), member of parliament (MP) for Leicestershire in 1360/1
- John Talbot (New Romney MP) (died 1403), MP for New Romney
- Sir John Talbot of Lacock (1630–1714), English MP for Worcestershire, Knaresborough, Ludgershall and Devizes
- John Ivory-Talbot (c. 1691–1772), MP for Ludgershall and Wiltshire
- John Talbot (judge) (c. 1712–1756), British MP (for Brecon and Ilchester) and judge (Recorder of Brecon and Puisne Justice of Chester)
- John Talbot (Marlborough MP) (c. 1717–1778), British MP for Marlborough 1747–1754
- John Talbot (died 1818), known as John Crosbie from 1816, MP for Ardfert
- J. E. Talbot (John Ellis Talbot, 1906–1967), British Conservative MP for Brierley Hill 1959–1967
- John Gilbert Talbot (1835–1910), British Conservative MP for West Kent 1868–1878 and Oxford University 1878–1910
- John Hyacinth Talbot (1794–1868), Irish MP in the British Parliament for New Ross 1832–1841 and 1847–1852
- John Talbot (Jacobite), 17th-century Irish landowner, politician and soldier
- John C. Talbot (1784–1860), American businessman and politician from Maine

== Others ==
- Sir John Talbot of Grafton (1545–1611), English recusant Catholic
- John Talbot (martyr) (died 1600), English recusant Catholic and Martyr
- John Talbot (Royal Navy officer) (1769–1851), Royal Navy officer
- John Talbot (reformer) (1797–1874), schoolmaster, journalist, and merchant
- John G. Talbot (1844–1870), U.S. naval officer
- John Michael Talbot (born 1954), American Catholic singer guitarist
- John Talbot (died 1549), English Tudor knight and lord of the manor
- John W. Talbot, founder of the Order of Owls

== Fictional characters ==
- Sir John Talbot, in the film The Wolf Man

== See also ==
- John Talbott (disambiguation)
- Talbot (surname)
