= Talbott =

Talbott is a surname. Notable people with the surname include:

== People ==
- Albert G. Talbott (1808–1887), American politician from Kentucky; U.S. representative 1855–59
- Anna Talbott McPherson (1904–2003), American biographer
- Carlos Talbott (1920–2015), American Air Force officer; vice commander in chief of the Pacific Air Forces 1973–74
- Frank Talbott (fl. 1907–1909), American Negro league baseball player
- Gloria Talbott (1931–2000), American film and television actress
- Harold E. Talbott (1888–1957), American businessman; Secretary of the Air Force 1953–55
- Hudson Talbott (1949–2026), American author and cartoonist
- John Talbott (mayor) (contemporary), American politician from Washington State; mayor of Spokane 1998–2000
- John R. Talbott, American finance expert, author, commentator, and political analyst
- Joseph Talbott (1933–2014), American politician
- Joshua Frederick Cockey Talbott (1843–1918), American politician from Maryland; U.S. representative 1879–1918
- Leander J. Talbott (1849–1924), American politician from Missouri; mayor of Kansas City 1884
- Lee Talbott (1887–1954), American Olympic track and field athlete
- Mark Talbott (contemporary), American professional squash player and coach
- Michael Talbott (born 1955), American film and television actor
- Nathan Talbott (born 1984), English professional football player
- Page Talbott (born 1951), American author and historian
- Payton Talbott (born 1998), American mixed martial artist
- Strobe Talbott (born 1946), American journalist and diplomat
- Thomas Talbott (contemporary), American professor of philosophy

== Fictional characters ==
- Chase Talbott III, character from the comic strip Doonesbury
- Talbott Reynolds, a character from Chuck Palahniuk's novel Adjustment Day

== See also ==
- Talbot (surname)
- Talbott, Tennessee
