= John Barry (1814 ship) =

Merchant ship built in 1814 at Whitby, England

History

United Kingdom
- Name: John Barry
- Owner: John Barry
- Builder: John Barry
- Launched: 1814, Whitby
- Fate: 1841 damaged in a typhoon and hulked

General characteristics
- Tons burthen: 520, or 521 (bm)
- Length: 120 ft 5 in (36.7 m) (keel)
- Beam: 31 ft 10 1/2 in (9.7 m)
- Propulsion: Sail

John Barry was a three-masted merchant ship, convict transport, and immigrant transport built in 1814, at Whitby, England by John Barry for his own interests. A typhoon damaged her in 1841. At last report she was an opium hulk at Hong Kong.

== Career ==
1st convict voyage (1819): Under the command of Captain Stephenson Ellerby, John Barry sailed from Portsmouth, England on 30 April 1819, and arrived at Port Jackson, Australia on 26 September 1819. She embarked 142 male convicts, none of whom died on the voyage. Among the free passengers aboard was Commissioner John Bigge, and his secretary Thomas Scott, who arrived to report on the state of the colony for the British government.

2nd convict voyage (1821): John Barry was under the command of Roger Dobson. She sailed from Cork, Ireland on 16 June 1821, arrived at Port Jackson on 7 November 1821. She embarked 180 male convicts, none of whom died on the voyage.

Robinson settler scheme (1825): John Barry, Peter Roche, master, carried 253 assisted immigrants from Cork to Quebec under a scheme organized by Peter Robinson. John Barry left Cork on 22 April 1825, and arrived at Quebec on 6 July.

Troop transport (1826): John Barry arrived in Hobart, Van Dieman's Land, on 26 August 1826, with the third company of the New South Wales Royal Veterans Companies. The unit consisted of a captain, two lieutenants, and 56 other ranks. They brought with them 45 wives and 42 children.

She underwent repairs in 1828, and had new top-sides installed and part new wales.

Canadian immigrants (1828): Captain John Davidson sailed from London on 8 June 1828, and arrived at Quebec on 10 August. John Barry was carrying 24 immigrants.

3rd convict voyage (1834): John Barry sailed to Hobart, Australia from England on 4 April 1834 under the command of John Robson; she arrived on 11 August 1834. She embarked 320 male convicts, none of whom died en route. She had a new deck and large repairs in 1834.

4th convict voyage (1835–1836): John Barry left Torbay, England on 21 September 1835, under the command of John Robson, and arrived at Port Jackson on 17 January 1836. She had embarked 320 male convicts, two of whom died on the voyage. On this voyage she brought out the lanthorn (lantern) for the Newcastle Heads (Nobbys) lighthouse.

In 1836, she had some repairs undertaken, and was doubled, felted, and coppered.

On her return voyage, she returned the Tolpuddle Martyrs James Loveless, Thomas and John Standfield, and James Brine back to England after they were pardoned.

5th convict voyage (1838–1839): Under the command of John Robson, she sailed from Sheerness, England on 17 November 1838, and arrived at Port Jackson, on 22 March 1839. She had embarked 320 male convicts, one of whom died on the voyage.

On 12 October 1838, the executors of the will of John Barry sold John Barry to Stephen Ellerby.

John Barry was reported to be a wreck in the Lombok Straits, and deserted by all her crew in 1840, however she was able to be got off after seven hours. She suffered the loss of her false keel and minor damage to her copper sheathing. She put into Sourabaya (now Surabaya) where she was repaired. She arrived at Port Jackson on 31 January 1841, with produce, 165 horses, and a tiger from Java.

== Fate ==
She left Sydney on 15 March 1841, bound for China. She was caught in a typhoon on 20 July and lost her three masts. She was later condemned. At last report she was an opium hulk at Hong Kong. (Note: At Hong Kong John Barry was under the charge of Hugh McGregor. In 1856, McGregor would become commander of Whitby's first police.)
