= Biblical Songs =

Song cycle by Antonín Dvořák; musical settings of ten texts from the Book of Psalms

Biblické písně Biblical Songs
- Song cycle by Antonín Dvořák
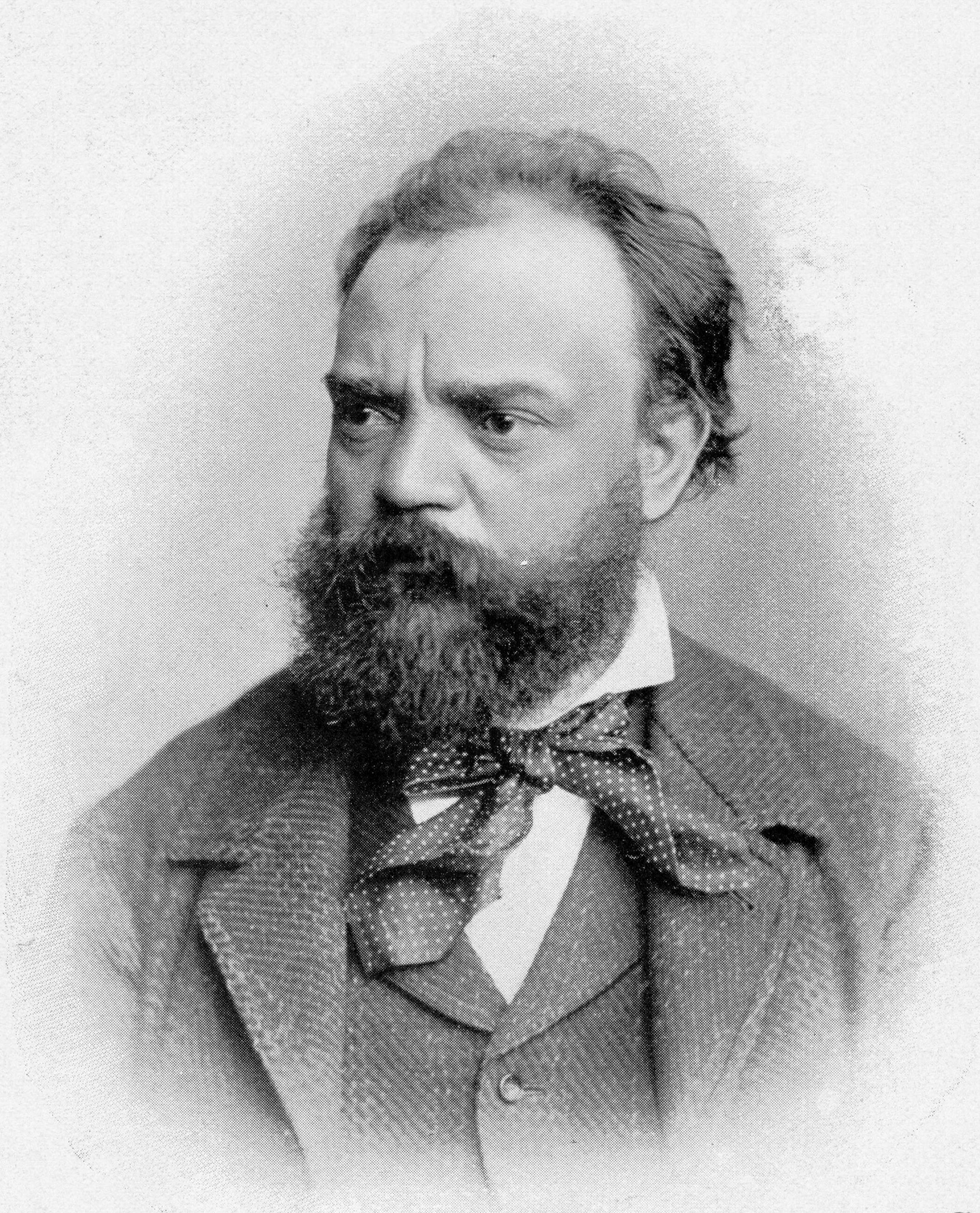
- The composer in 1882
- Opus: 99
- Text: Selections from the Book of Psalms
- Language: Czech
- Composed: 1894
- Scoring: low voice and piano

Biblical Songs (Czech: Biblické písně) is a song cycle which consists of musical settings by Czech composer Antonín Dvořák of ten texts, selected by him, from the Book of Psalms. It was originally composed for low voice and piano (1894, Op. 99, B. 185). The first five songs were later orchestrated by the composer (1895, B. 189).

== History and reception ==
Biblical Songs was written between 5 and 26 March 1894, while Dvořák was living in New York City. It has been suggested that he was prompted to write them by news of a death (of his father Frantisek, or of the composers Tchaikovsky or Gounod, or of the conductor Hans von Bülow); but there is no good evidence for that, and the most likely explanation is that he felt out of place in the bustle of a big city, and that after two years in America he was homesick for Bohemia. He returned to Europe in April 1895.

The original piano version was published in Czech by Simrock in 1895, with English and German translations of the text. Dvořák took particular care that the translations were appropriate to the vocal line. In January 1895, Dvořák orchestrated the first five songs. The manuscript was later lost, and only rediscovered and published in 1914 (by Simrock). In 1914, the conductor Vilém Zemánek orchestrated the other five. Arrangements of the cycle for other forces, and other orchestrations of the second five songs, have since been made.

The first known public performance of any of the songs was on 26 September 1895: it was of No. 6 ("Slyš, ó Bože, volání mé") only, and took place at Mladá Boleslav; the performers were O. Schellerova (voice) and an unknown pianist. It is not known when or where the full cycle with piano accompaniment was premiered. The orchestral version of the first five songs was premiered in Prague on 4 January 1896, by the baritone František Šír and the Czech Philharmonic conducted by the composer. On 19 March 1896, Dvořák conducted a performance of the same songs in Queen’s Hall, London, where the soloist was Katharine Fisk.

Even if Dvorak had only written Biblical Songs and nothing else, it wouldn't have mattered. Whenever I get the chance to sing them, I feel like I’m in heaven.

— Eva Urbanová

== The songs ==
Ten Biblical songs (Czech: Biblické Písně) by Antonín Dvořák
Biblical Songs.

The texts are from the 16th century Czech-language Bible of Kralice, and are available online with some translations into other languages. The English and German titles in the following list are taken from the original vocal score, not from any English Bible.

1. Psalm 97, "Oblak a mrákota jest vůkol něho". Andantino. ("Darkness and thunderclouds are round about Him", "Um ihn her ist Wolken und Dunkel", Psalm 97:2–6.)
2. Psalm 119, "Skrýše má a paveza má Ty jsi". Andante. ("Lord my shield, my refuge and hope", "Herr, mein Schirm und Schild", Psalm 119:114–117, 119, 120.)
3. Psalm 55, "Slyš, ó Bože, slyš modlitbu mou". Andante. ("Hear, oh hear my prayer", "Gott erhöre mein Gebet!", Psalm 55:1, 2, 4–5, 6, 7, 8.)
4. Psalm 23, "Hospodin jest můj pastýř". Andante. ("Oh, my shepherd is the Lord", "Gott ist mein Hirte", Psalm 23:1–4.)
5. Psalm 144, Psalm 145, "Bože! Bože! Píseň novou". Risoluto, maestoso. ("Songs of gladness will I sing Thee", "Herr! nun sing' ich Dir ein neues Lied", Psalm 144:9 and 145:1–3, 5, 6.)
6. Psalm 61, Psalm 63, "Slyš, ó Bože, volání mé". Andante. ("Hear, oh Lord, my bitter cry", "Herr! Höre Gott, mein Flehen", Psalm 61:1, 3, 4 and 63:1, 4–5.)
7. Psalm 137, "Při řekách babylonských". Andante. ("By the shore of the river Babylon", "An den Wassern zu Babylon", Psalm 137:1–5.)
8. Psalm 25, "Popatriž na mne a smiluj se nade mnou". Andante. ("Oh, Lord, have mercy and turn Thou Thy face to me", "Wende Dich zu mir!", Psalm 25:16–18, 20.)
9. Psalm 121, "Pozdvihuji očí svých k horám". Andante con moto. ("My eyes will I to the hills lift up", "Ich hebe meine Augen auf zu den Bergen", Psalm 121:1–4.)
10. Psalm 98, Psalm 96, "Zpívejte Hospodinu píseň novou". Allegro moderato. ("Oh sing unto the Lord a joyful song", "Singet ein neues Lied", Psalm 98:1, 4–5, 7, 8 and 96:11–12.)

A typical performance of the complete cycle takes about 25 minutes.

== Recordings ==
The complete cycle has been recorded numerous times since the introduction of LP records in the late 1940s. Some notable recordings up to and including the first LP release include:

- 1913: George Henschel (voice and piano), "By the Waters of Babylon" (No. 7)
- Unknown date: Hynek Maxa (baritone) and unknown pianist, the complete cycle
- Unknown date: Paul Robeson (bass) and unknown pianist, "Při řekách babylonských" (No. 7)
- 1952: Marta Krásová (mezzo-soprano) and Přemysl Kočí (baritone) with Miroslav Kampelsheimer (organ). First known LP recording. 10" mono LP Supraphon DM 5128
- 2004 Royal Concertgebouw Orchestra conducted by Nikolaus Harnoncourt, Christian Gerhaher, Bariton
- Nikolaus Harnoncourt Live - the radio recordings rco19007 2022
