= Psalm 61 =

Biblical psalm

- "Hear my cry, O God; attend unto my prayer"
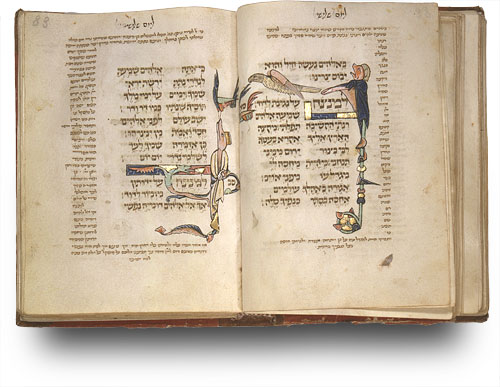
- Psalm 61 in the Parma Psalter
- Other name: Psalm 60; "Exaudi Deus"
- Language: Hebrew (original)

Psalm 61
- ← Psalm 60 Psalm 62 →
- Book: Book of Psalms
- Hebrew Bible part: Ketuvim
- Order in the Hebrew part: 1
- Category: Sifrei Emet
- Christian Bible part: Old Testament
- Order in the Christian part: 19

Psalm 61 is the 61st psalm of the Book of Psalms, beginning in English in the King James Version: "Hear my cry, O God; attend unto my prayer". In the slightly different numbering system of the Greek Septuagint version of the Bible and the Latin Vulgate, this psalm is Psalm 60. In Latin, it is known as "Exaudi Deus". The psalm is to be played on a neginah or stringed instrument. The Psalm is attributed to King David. The Jerusalem Bible calls it a "prayer of an exile".

The psalm forms a regular part of Jewish, Catholic, Lutheran, Anglican and other Protestant liturgies. It has been set to music.

== Prayer of an exile ==
The Jerusalem Bible notes that verses 1-5 of this psalm are the lament of an exiled Levite, and verses 6-7 are a prayer for the king.

== Uses ==
=== Judaism ===
- This psalm is recited on Hoshana Rabbah.
- Verse 5 is found in the repetition of the Amidah during Rosh Hashanah.

=== Catholic Church ===
During the Middle Ages monasteries used this psalm traditionally recited or sung during the celebration of the matins of Wednesday, according to the Rule of Saint Benedict established in 530.

In the current Liturgy of the Hours, Psalm 61 is sung or recited at the midday office on the Saturday of the second week of the four weekly cycle of liturgical prayers.

=== Coptic Orthodox Church ===
In the Agpeya, the Coptic Church's book of hours, this psalm is prayed in the office of Sext.

=== Book of Common Prayer ===
In the Church of England's Book of Common Prayer, this psalm is appointed to be read on the evening of the 11th day of the month.

== Musical settings ==
Part of the text of Psalm 61, verses 6 to 8, have been adapted as a coronation anthem for English kings, O Lord, grant the King a long life. Early settings were written by Thomas Weelkes and Thomas Tomkins, and was sung during the procession of the monarch between Westminster Hall and Westminster Abbey. It was last used in that way at the coronation of George IV in 1821 to a setting by William Child; neither the procession nor the anthem was included in later British coronations.

Heinrich Schütz set the psalm in a metred version in German, "Gott, mein Geschrei erhöre", SWV 158, as part of the Becker Psalter, first published in 1628. Antonín Dvořák set verses 1, 3, and 4 to music (together with part of Psalm 63) in No. 6 of his Biblical Songs (1894).

Alan Hovhaness set verses 1 through 4 in his 1951 work From the End of the Earth.

== Text ==
The following table shows the Hebrew text of the Psalm with vowels, alongside the Koine Greek text in the Septuagint and the English translation from the King James Version. Note that the meaning can slightly differ between these versions, as the Septuagint and the Masoretic Text come from different textual traditions. (Note: A 1917 translation directly from Hebrew to English by the Jewish Publication Society can be found here or here, and an 1844 translation directly from the Septuagint by L. C. L. Brenton can be found here. Both translations are in the public domain.) In the Septuagint, this psalm is numbered Psalm 60.

#	Hebrew	English	Greek
(Note: In the Jewish verse numbering, the ascription of this psalm is verse 1, and the rest of the psalm begins from verse 2. However, the Christian verse numbering does not count the ascription.)	לַמְנַצֵּ֬חַ ׀ עַֽל־נְגִינַ֬ת לְדָוִֽד׃	(To the chief Musician upon Neginah, A Psalm of David.)	Εἰς τὸ τέλος, ἐν ὕμνοις· τῷ Δαυΐδ. -
1	שִׁמְעָ֣ה אֱ֭לֹהִים רִנָּתִ֑י הַ֝קְשִׁ֗יבָה תְּפִלָּתִֽי׃	Hear my cry, O God; attend unto my prayer.	ΕΙΣΑΚΟΥΣΟΝ, ὁ Θεός, τῆς δεήσεώς μου, πρόσχες τῇ προσευχῇ μου.
2	מִקְצֵ֤ה הָאָ֨רֶץ ׀ אֵלֶ֣יךָ אֶ֭קְרָא בַּעֲטֹ֣ף לִבִּ֑י בְּצוּר־יָר֖וּם מִמֶּ֣נִּי תַנְחֵֽנִי׃	From the end of the earth will I cry unto thee, when my heart is overwhelmed: lead me to the rock that is higher than I.	ἀπὸ τῶν περάτων τῆς γῆς πρὸς σὲ ἐκέκραξα ἐν τῷ ἀκηδιάσαι τὴν καρδίαν μου· ἐν πέτρᾳ ὕψωσάς με, ὡδήγησάς με,
3	כִּֽי־הָיִ֣יתָ מַחְסֶ֣ה לִ֑י מִגְדַּל־עֹ֝֗ז מִפְּנֵ֥י אוֹיֵֽב׃	For thou hast been a shelter for me, and a strong tower from the enemy.	ὅτι ἐγενήθης ἐλπίς μου, πύργος ἰσχύος ἀπὸ προσώπου ἐχθροῦ.
4	אָג֣וּרָה בְ֭אׇהׇלְךָ עוֹלָמִ֑ים אֶ֥חֱסֶ֨ה בְסֵ֖תֶר כְּנָפֶ֣יךָ סֶּֽלָה׃	I will abide in thy tabernacle for ever: I will trust in the covert of thy wings. Selah.	παροικήσω ἐν τῷ σκηνώματί σου εἰς τοὺς αἰῶνας, σκεπασθήσομαι ἐν σκέπει τῶν πτερύγων σου. (διάψαλμα).
5	כִּֽי־אַתָּ֣ה אֱ֭לֹהִים שָׁמַ֣עְתָּ לִנְדָרָ֑י נָתַ֥תָּ יְ֝רֻשַּׁ֗ת יִרְאֵ֥י שְׁמֶֽךָ׃	For thou, O God, hast heard my vows: thou hast given me the heritage of those that fear thy name.	ὅτι σύ, ὁ Θεός, εἰσήκουσας τῶν εὐχῶν μου, ἔδωκας κληρονομίαν τοῖς φοβουμένοις τὸ ὄνομά σου.
6	יָמִ֣ים עַל־יְמֵי־מֶ֣לֶךְ תּוֹסִ֑יף שְׁ֝נוֹתָ֗יו כְּמוֹ־דֹ֥ר וָדֹֽר׃	Thou wilt prolong the king's life: and his years as many generations.	ἡμέρας ἐφ᾿ ἡμέρας τοῦ βασιλέως προσθήσεις, τὰ ἔτη αὐτοῦ ἕως ἡμέρας γενεᾶς καὶ γενεᾶς.
7	יֵשֵׁ֣ב ע֭וֹלָם לִפְנֵ֣י אֱלֹהִ֑ים חֶ֥סֶד וֶ֝אֱמֶ֗ת מַ֣ן יִנְצְרֻֽהוּ׃	He shall abide before God for ever: O prepare mercy and truth, which may preserve him.	διαμενεῖ εἰς τὸν αἰῶνα ἐνώπιον τοῦ Θεοῦ· ἔλεος καὶ ἀλήθειαν αὐτοῦ τίς ἐκζητήσει;
8	כֵּ֤ן אֲזַמְּרָ֣ה שִׁמְךָ֣ לָעַ֑ד לְֽשַׁלְּמִ֥י נְ֝דָרַ֗י י֣וֹם ׀ יֽוֹם׃	So will I sing praise unto thy name for ever, that I may daily perform my vows.	οὕτως ψαλῶ τῷ ὀνόματί σου εἰς τὸν αἰῶνα τοῦ αἰῶνος τοῦ ἀποδοῦναί με τὰς εὐχάς μου ἡμέραν ἐξ ἡμέρας.
