= Brunswick (1791 ship) =

History

Great Britain
- Name: Brunswick
- Builder: Thames
- Launched: 1791
- Fate: Condemned 1849

General characteristics
- Tons burthen: Old Act:508, or 525 (bm); New Act (post 1836): 571 (bm)
- Complement: 1793:70; 1812:20
- Armament: 1793:20 × 12&9-pounder guns; 1795:14 × 9-pounder + 6 × 12-pounder guns; 1812:2 × 9-pounder guns + 8 × 18-pounder carronades

Brunswick was launched on the River Thames in 1791 as a West Indiaman. She captured one prize. After the end of the Napoleonic Wars, she made two voyages carrying almost 600 migrants from Ireland to Canada, She spent most of her career trading between Britain and Quebec, though she also traded with other destinations. She was condemned at Valparaiso in 1849.

== Career ==
Brunswick first appeared in Lloyd's Register (LR) with J. Douglas, master, T.Hibbert & Co., owner, and trade London–Jamaica.

After the outbreak of war with France Captain John Graham Douglas acquired a letter of marque on 10 October 1793. The size of the crew previewed on the letter of marque suggested that the initial plan was that Brunswick would cruise as a privateer. There is no sign that she ever did so. Instead, she apparently sailed as a West Indiaman.

Year	Master	Owner	Trade	Source & notes
1795	J.Douglas	Hibbert & Co.	London–Jamaica	LR
1801	J.Douglas; J.Shaw	Hibbert & Co.	London–Jamaica	LR

On 4 April 1805 Brunswick, Shaw, master, arrived at Jamaica "with their prize".

Brunswick then disappeared from the registers until 1810–1811.

Year	Master	Owner	Trade	Source & notes
1810	J.Tell	Corsbie	London–Copenhagen	RS
1811	Machie	Ritchie	London; Greenock–Jamaica	LR; small repairs 1804, new topsides and thorough repair 1807

On 5 June 1812 Captain John Otto Richard Clearly acquired a letter of marque. However, he does not appear as master in either LR or the Register of Shipping.

Year	Master	Owner	Trade	Source & notes
1813	Mackie; Hart	Ritchie	London–Jamaica	LR; thorough repair 1807 and small repairs 1810
1814	Anderson	Ford & Co.	London–Rio de Janeiro	LR; large repairs 1807 & 1810; damages repaired 1813
1815	Anderson	Ford & Co.	London–Rio de Janeiro; London–Quebec	LR; large repairs 1807 & 1810; damages repaired 1813
1820	R. Blake	Rule & Co.	London–Quebec	LR;

In June 1818 Richard Talbot left Cork with 230 settlers for Canada. Brunswick, Blake, master, arrived at Quebec on 29 July.

In 1825 Brunswick, Robert Blake, master, carried 343 assisted immigrants from Cork to Quebec under a scheme organized by Peter Robinson. Brunswick left Cork on 11 May and arrived at Quebec on 12 June.

Year	Master	Owner	Trade	Source
1825	R.Blake	Rule & Co.	London–Quebec	LR; large repairs 1818 and small repairs 1820 & 1824.
1830	R.Blake	Rule & Co.	London–Quebec	LR; large repairs 1818 and small repairs 1820 & 1824.
1835	H.Blake	Tebbut & Co.	London–Quebec	LR; large repair 1832.
1840	Veale	Tebbut & Co.	London–Quebec	LR; damage repaired 1839.
1845	Veale	Tebbut & Co.	London–Ichebo	LR; damage repaired 1839.
1845	Coppel	Tebbut & Co.	London–Bombay	LR (Supple. pages); damage repaired 1839.

== Fate ==
Brunswick was last listed in 1850. LR showed her with T.Poulton, master, Tebbuts & Co., owners, and trade London–Valparaiso. She had undergone small repairs in 1849.

Brunswick, Poulton, master, had sailed to the Chincha Islands to gather guano. She sailed from there for the United States when she became leaky. She put back into Valparaiso on 16 September 1849 and was condemned there. (Note: Earlier, circa 1845, she had participated in the guano trade at Ichebo.)
