= Psalm 63 =

Biblical psalm

- "O God, thou art my God; early will I seek thee"
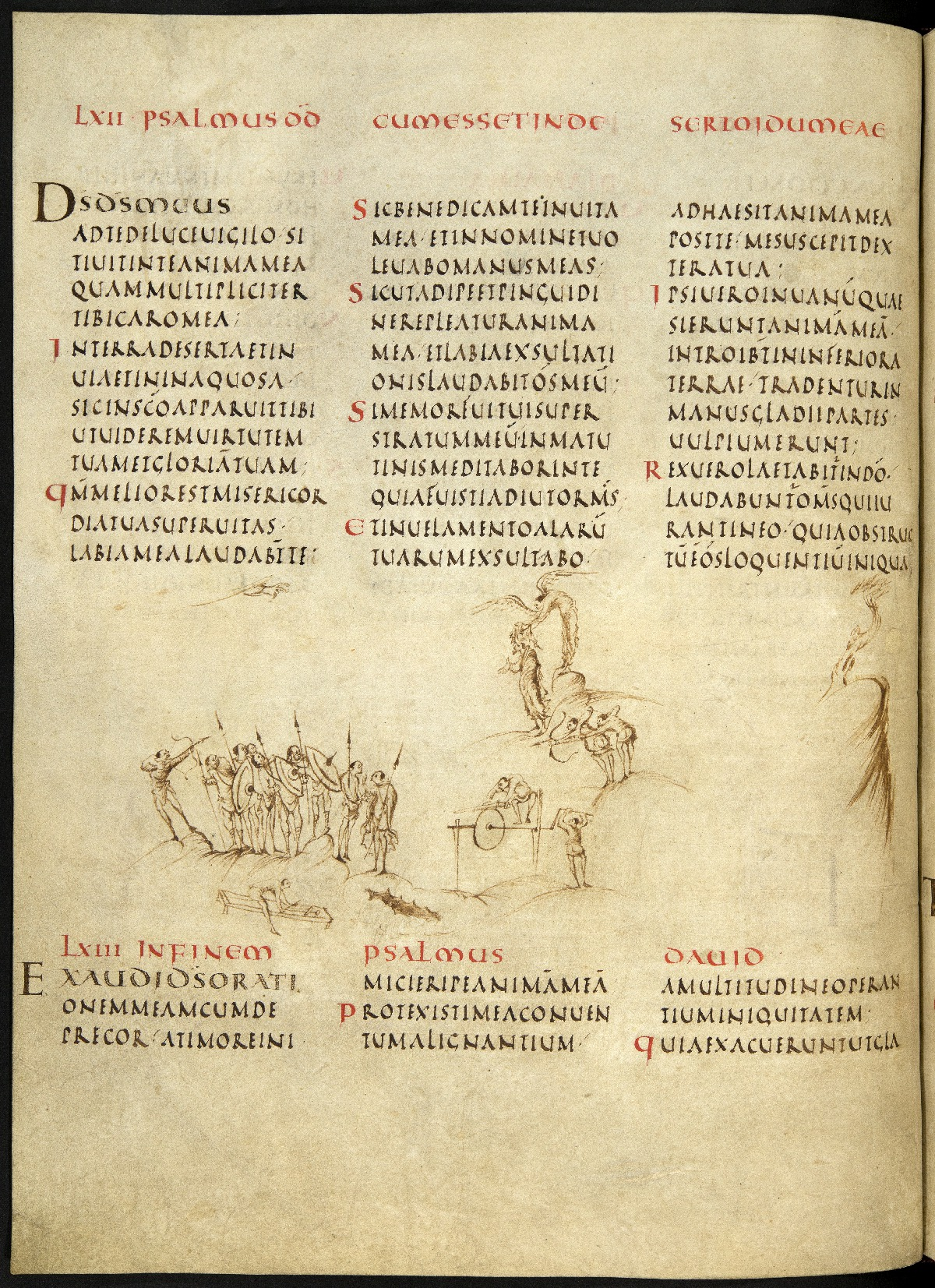
- Psalm 63 in the Utrecht Psalter
- Other name: Psalm 62; "Deus Deus meus ad te de luce vigilo sitivit"
- Language: Hebrew (original)

Psalm 63
- ← Psalm 62 Psalm 64 →
- Book: Book of Psalms
- Hebrew Bible part: Ketuvim
- Order in the Hebrew part: 1
- Category: Sifrei Emet
- Christian Bible part: Old Testament
- Order in the Christian part: 19

Psalm 63 is the 63rd psalm of the Book of Psalms, beginning in English in the King James Version: "O God, thou art my God; early will I seek thee". In the slightly different numbering system of the Greek Septuagint version of the Bible and the Latin Vulgate, this psalm is Psalm 62. In Latin, it is known as "Deus Deus meus". It is attributed to King David, set when he was in the wilderness of Judah, and its theme concerns being stranded in the wilderness away from one's family.

The psalm forms a regular part of Jewish, Catholic, Lutheran, Anglican and other Protestant liturgies. It has been set to music.

== Theme ==
The Psalm is composed of two parts: first (verses 1–8) an address to God:

O God, You are my God; Early will I seek You.

Secondly, the psalmist's wishes of vengeance are then formulated in the third person in the last three verses.

The first part, more developed, evokes desire, praise and then trust in God. The image of the arid earth in verse 1 does not express the absence of God as in other psalms, but rather the aspiration to meet. Confidence is then expressed by the symbolism of the protective bird. Perhaps also the wings recall the wings of the kerubim on the ark of the covenant, these representing the Lord.

The change is evident in verse 10. There is now talk of vengeance towards the enemies of the psalmist, and some may evade this disconcerting psalm end. It is a question of a king in the last verse. Perhaps it is the psalmist himself, or a way of extending his prayer to the community. There is such a cry of vengeance in the Book of Jeremiah 11:20.

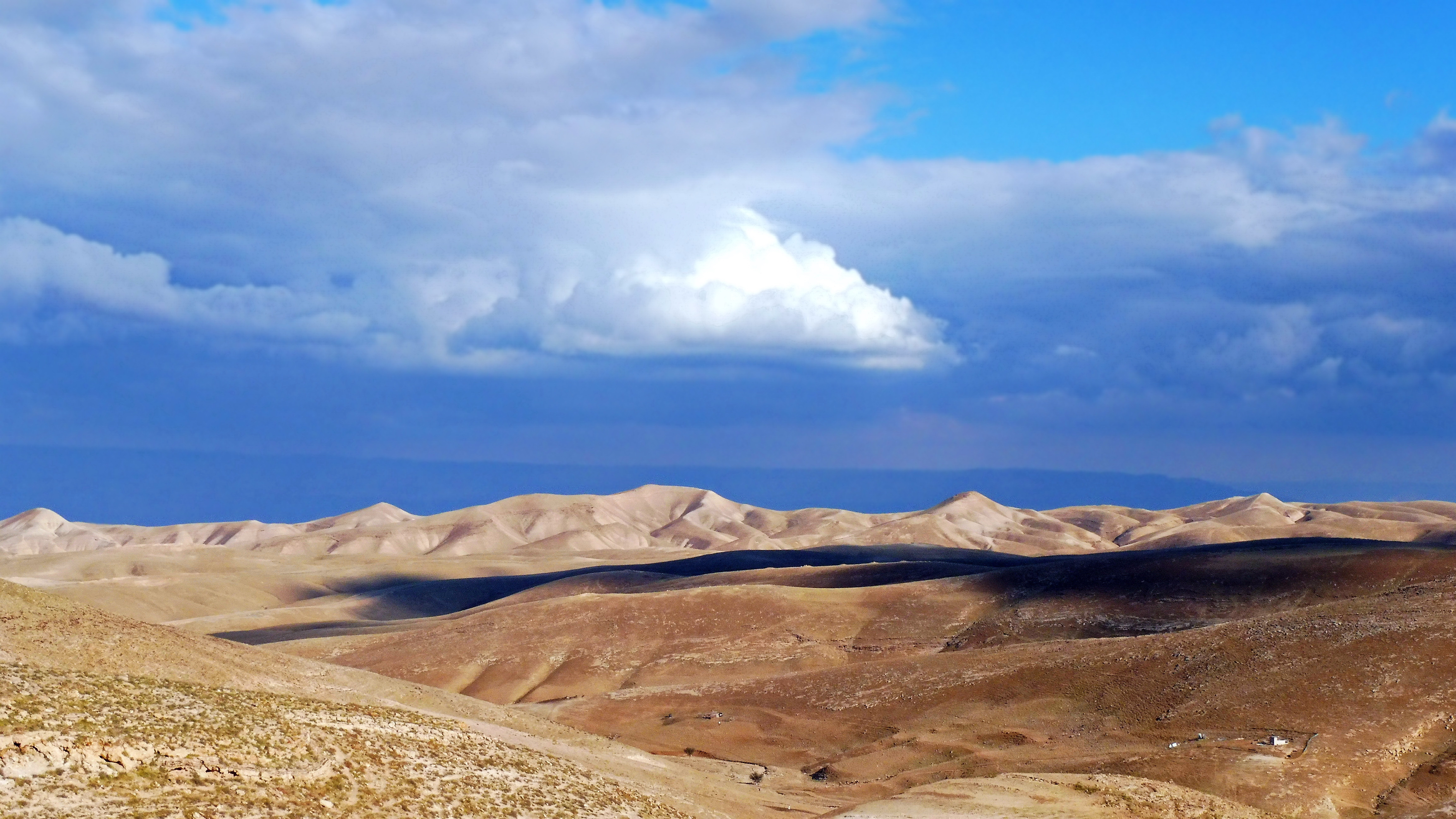
A view of the Judean Desert from Ma'ale Adumim near Jerusalem

== Uses ==
=== Early Church ===
The ancient church up to about 400 AD had the practice of beginning the singing of the Psalms at each Sunday service with Psalm 63, called "the morning hymn". John Chrysostom wrote that "it was decreed and ordained by the primitive [church] fathers, that no day should pass without the public singing of this Psalm". He also observed that "the spirit and soul of the whole Book of Psalms is contracted into this Psalm".

=== Catholicism ===
This psalm was already chosen by St Benedict of Nursia around 530, as the fourth and last psalm during the solemn office at the Sunday laudes (Rule of St. Benedict, chapter XI).

Psalm 63 is still recited every Sunday at the Lauds by priests and religious communities, according to the liturgy of the Hours. In the triennial cycle of the Sunday Mass, it is read on the 22nd and 32nd Sundays of the ordinary time of the year A, and the 12th Sunday of the ordinary time of the year C.

=== Coptic Orthodox Church ===
In the Agpeya, the Coptic Church's book of hours, this psalm is prayed in the offices of Prime and Sext.

=== Book of Common Prayer ===
In the Church of England's Book of Common Prayer, this psalm is appointed to be read on the morning of the 12th day of the month.

== Music ==
Heinrich Schütz set the psalm in a metred version in German, "O Gott, du mein getreuer Gott", SWV 160, as part of the Becker Psalter, first published in 1628. At the end of the 17th century, Michel-Richard de Lalande wrote a work in Latin according to this psalm (S.20). It is one of the great motets to celebrate the services at the royal chapel of the Château de Versailles, for the Sun King Louis XIV.

Czech composer Antonín Dvořák set part of Psalm 63 (together with part of Psalm 61) as No. 6 of his Biblical Songs in 1894.

== Text ==
The following table shows the Hebrew text of the Psalm with vowels, alongside the Koine Greek text in the Septuagint and the English translation from the King James Version. Note that the meaning can slightly differ between these versions, as the Septuagint and the Masoretic Text come from different textual traditions. (Note: A 1917 translation directly from Hebrew to English by the Jewish Publication Society can be found here or here, and an 1844 translation directly from the Septuagint by L. C. L. Brenton can be found here. Both translations are in the public domain.) In the Septuagint, this psalm is numbered Psalm 62.

#	Hebrew	English	Greek
(Note: In the Jewish verse numbering, the ascription of this psalm is verse 1, and the rest of the psalm begins from verse 2. However, the Christian verse numbering does not count the ascription.)	מִזְמ֥וֹר לְדָוִ֑ד בִּ֝הְיוֹת֗וֹ בְּמִדְבַּ֥ר יְהוּדָֽה׃	(A Psalm of David, when he was in the wilderness of Judah.)	Ψαλμὸς τῷ Δαυΐδ ἐν τῷ εἶναι αὐτὸν ἐν τῇ ἐρήμῳ τῆς ᾿Ιδουμαίας. -
1	אֱלֹהִ֤ים ׀ אֵלִ֥י אַתָּ֗ה אֲֽשַׁ֫חֲרֶ֥ךָּ צָמְאָ֬ה לְךָ֨ ׀ נַפְשִׁ֗י כָּמַ֣הּ לְךָ֣ בְשָׂרִ֑י בְּאֶֽרֶץ־צִיָּ֖ה וְעָיֵ֣ף בְּלִי־מָֽיִם׃	O God, thou art my God; early will I seek thee: my soul thirsteth for thee, my flesh longeth for thee in a dry and thirsty land, where no water is;	Ο ΘΕΟΣ ὁ Θεός μου, πρὸς σὲ ὀρθρίζω· ἐδίψησέ σε ἡ ψυχή μου, ποσαπλῶς σοι ἡ σάρξ μου ἐν γῇ ἐρήμῳ καὶ ἀβάτῳ καὶ ἀνύδρῳ.
2	כֵּ֭ן בַּקֹּ֣דֶשׁ חֲזִיתִ֑ךָ לִרְא֥וֹת עֻ֝זְּךָ֗ וּכְבוֹדֶֽךָ׃	To see thy power and thy glory, so as I have seen thee in the sanctuary.	οὕτως ἐν τῷ ἁγίῳ ὤφθην σοι τοῦ ἰδεῖν τὴν δύναμίν σου καὶ τὴν δόξαν σου.
3	כִּי־ט֣וֹב חַ֭סְדְּךָ מֵחַיִּ֗ים שְׂפָתַ֥י יְשַׁבְּחֽוּנְךָ׃	Because thy lovingkindness is better than life, my lips shall praise thee.	ὅτι κρεῖσσον τὸ ἔλεός σου ὑπὲρ ζωάς· τὰ χείλη μου ἐπαινέσουσί σε.
4	כֵּ֣ן אֲבָרֶכְךָ֣ בְחַיָּ֑י בְּ֝שִׁמְךָ֗ אֶשָּׂ֥א כַפָּֽי׃	Thus will I bless thee while I live: I will lift up my hands in thy name.	οὕτως εὐλογήσω σε ἐν τῇ ζωῇ μου καὶ ἐν τῷ ὀνόματί σου ἀρῶ τὰς χεῖράς μου.
5	כְּמ֤וֹ חֵ֣לֶב וָ֭דֶשֶׁן תִּשְׂבַּ֣ע נַפְשִׁ֑י וְשִׂפְתֵ֥י רְ֝נָנ֗וֹת יְהַלֶּל־פִּֽי׃	My soul shall be satisfied as with marrow and fatness; and my mouth shall praise thee with joyful lips:	ὡς ἐκ στέατος καὶ πιότητος ἐμπλησθείη ἡ ψυχή μου, καὶ χείλη ἀγαλλιάσεως αἰνέσει τὸ στόμα μου.
6	אִם־זְכַרְתִּ֥יךָ עַל־יְצוּעָ֑י בְּ֝אַשְׁמֻר֗וֹת אֶהְגֶּה־בָּֽךְ׃	When I remember thee upon my bed, and meditate on thee in the night watches.	εἰ ἐμνημόνευόν σου ἐπὶ τῆς στρωμνῆς μου, ἐν τοῖς ὄρθροις ἐμελέτων εἰς σέ·
7	כִּֽי־הָיִ֣יתָ עֶזְרָ֣תָה לִּ֑י וּבְצֵ֖ל כְּנָפֶ֣יךָ אֲרַנֵּֽן׃	Because thou hast been my help, therefore in the shadow of thy wings will I rejoice.	ὅτι ἐγενήθης βοηθός μου, καὶ ἐν τῇ σκέπῃ τῶν πτερύγων σου ἀγαλλιάσομαι.
8	דָּבְקָ֣ה נַפְשִׁ֣י אַחֲרֶ֑יךָ בִּ֝֗י תָּמְכָ֥ה יְמִינֶֽךָ׃	My soul followeth hard after thee: thy right hand upholdeth me.	ἐκολλήθη ἡ ψυχή μου ὀπίσω σου, ἐμοῦ δὲ ἀντελάβετο ἡ δεξιά σου.
9	וְהֵ֗מָּה לְ֭שׁוֹאָה יְבַקְשׁ֣וּ נַפְשִׁ֑י יָ֝בֹ֗אוּ בְּֽתַחְתִּיּ֥וֹת הָאָֽרֶץ׃	But those that seek my soul, to destroy it, shall go into the lower parts of the earth.	αὐτοὶ δὲ εἰς μάτην ἐζήτησαν τὴν ψυχήν μου, εἰσελεύσονται εἰς τὰ κατώτατα τῆς γῆς·
10	יַגִּירֻ֥הוּ עַל־יְדֵי־חָ֑רֶב מְנָ֖ת שֻׁעָלִ֣ים יִהְיֽוּ׃	They shall fall by the sword: they shall be a portion for foxes.	παραδοθήσονται εἰς χεῖρας ῥομφαίας, μερίδες ἀλωπέκων ἔσονται.
11	וְהַמֶּלֶךְ֮ יִשְׂמַ֢ח בֵּאלֹ֫הִ֥ים יִ֭תְהַלֵּל כׇּל־הַנִּשְׁבָּ֣ע בּ֑וֹ כִּ֥י יִ֝סָּכֵ֗ר פִּ֣י דוֹבְרֵי־שָֽׁקֶר׃	But the king shall rejoice in God; every one that sweareth by him shall glory: but the mouth of them that speak lies shall be stopped.	ὁ δὲ βασιλεὺς εὐφρανθήσεται ἐπὶ τῷ Θεῷ, ἐπαινεθήσεται πᾶς ὁ ὀμνύων ἐν αὐτῷ, ὅτι ἐνεφράγη στόμα λαλούντων ἄδικα.

=== Heading ===
Biblical commentator Cyril Rodd notes that the phrase "'When he was in the Wilderness of Judah' may refer to David's flight from Absalom (2 Samuel 15–16), but the time when Saul was pursuing David (1 Samuel 23:14; 24:2) has also been suggested".

=== Verse 10 ===
They shall fall by the sword: they shall be a portion for foxes.

Other translations refer to jackals rather than foxes. "It is the jackal rather than the fox which preys on dead bodies, and which assembles in troops on the battle-fields, to feast on the slain."

Verse 10 was quoted in the song "Portions for Foxes," by Rilo Kiley.
