= Peter Robinson (Canadian politician) =

Soldier and politician, born 1785

Peter Robinson (1785 – July 8, 1838) was a Canadian politician who served as Commissioner of Crown Lands as well as on the Legislative Assembly, Legislative Council, and Executive Council of Upper Canada. He is known for his work in organizing the migration and settlement of what is now Peterborough, Ontario.

== Early life ==
Robinson was born in (the parish of Queensbury) New Brunswick, the eldest son of Christopher Robinson (an officer of the Queen's Rangers) and Esther Sayre. He had two brothers, John Beverley and William Benjamin, and two sisters. The family settled first at Kingston, Ontario, in 1792 and then York, Upper Canada, (now Toronto) in 1798.

== Career ==
Robinson fought during the War of 1812, where he commanded a rifle company at the capture of Detroit. In 1813, he distinguished himself in the defence of Fort Michilimackinac. After the war, he operated as a fur trader and established a number of businesses in the Lake Simcoe area.

By 1817 he had been elected to represent the riding of (East) York & Simcoe in the Legislative Assembly of Upper Canada (7th Parliament of Upper Canada and 8th Parliament of Upper Canada). Starting in 1823 through to 1825 he administered the passage and settlement of over 2500 poor Catholic families mostly from County Cork, Ireland to settle in the hinterlands of Lanark County, Carleton County (today Ottawa) and Scott's Plains. Scott's Plains was renamed Peterborough in his honour. In 1827 he was appointed Commissioner of Crown Lands and he had a seat representing York in both the Legislative and Executive councils. In 1836 he resigned, with the rest of the Executive Council, from his responsibilities on the Council to protest the council's treatment by Lieutenant Governor Sir Francis Bond Head. He died in Toronto in 1838 and was survived by Isabella (1818-1873) and Frederick (1830-?), two of his three children.

== List of ships used for the settlement scheme ==
=== 1823 ===
- Hebe
- Stakesby

=== 1825 ===
- Fortitude – Thomas Lewis, master; 287 immigrants
- Resolution – Anthony Ward, master; 227 immigrants
- Albion – John Mills, master; 187 immigrants
- Brunswick
- Star – Joseph Becket, master; c.214 immigrants
- Amity – William Arrowsmith, master; 149 immigrants
- Regulus – George Dixon, master; 157 immigrants
- Elizabeth
- John Barry

== Bibliography ==
- Bill LaBranche. The Peter Robinson Settlement of 1825: A Story of the Irish Immigration to the City and County of Peterborough, Ontario. Homecoming '75 Committee; 1975.
- Carol Bennett McCuaig, Peter Robinson's Settlers. Juniper Books; 1987. ISBN 978-0-919137-16-5.
