= Plim =

plim may be:

- An acronym for:
  - "Probability limit" (plim) – see Convergence in probability
  - "Phosphorescence Lifetime Imaging Microscopy" (PLIM) - An imaging technique similar to Fluorescence-lifetime imaging microscopy but based on phosphorescence rather than fluorescence.
  - "Physical Layer Information Module" (PLIM) in Router and Switches
  - "Plant Life Management" (PLIM) in nuclear power
  - "Programmable Logic In-the-Middle" (PLIM) - A technique in computing where dataflows originated from a CPU are routed through a block of FPGA for analysis and manipulation.

== See also ==
- Plym (disambiguation)
