= GWR Ariadne Class =

Class of British 0-6-0 steam locomotives

GWR Gooch Standard Goods GWR Ariadne Class and Caliph Class
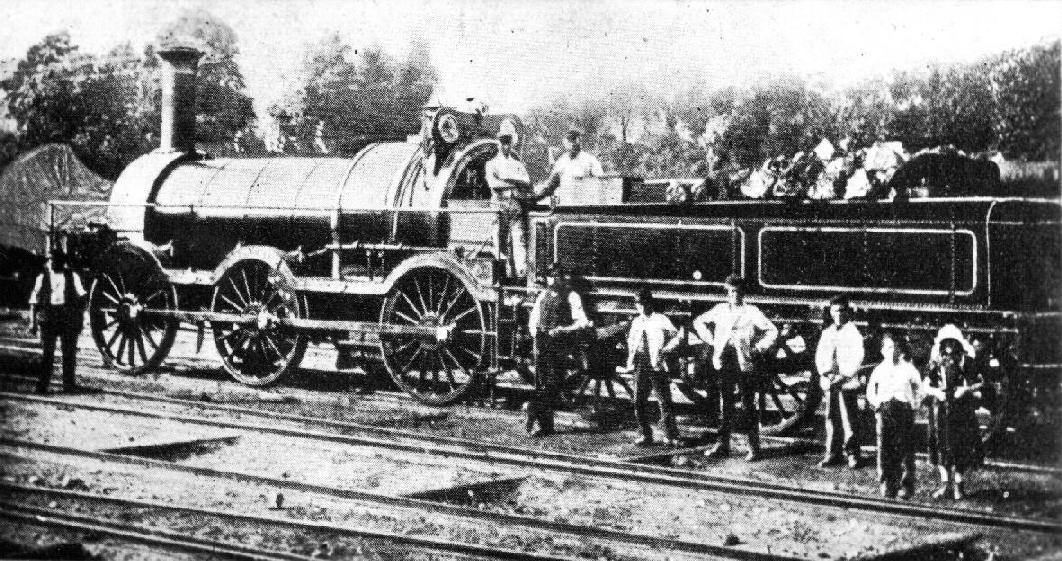
- Nemesis
Type and origin
- Power type: Steam
- Designer: Daniel Gooch
- Builder: Swindon Works, Great Western Railway
- Build date: 1852-1863
- Total produced: 102
Specifications
- Configuration
  - Whyte: 0-6-0
- Gauge: 7 ft 1/4 in (2,140 mm)
- Driver dia.: 5 ft 0 in (1,524 mm)
- Wheelbase: 16 ft 2 1/2 in (4.94 m)
- Cylinder size: 17 in × 24 in (432 mm × 610 mm)
Career
- Operators: Great Western Railway
- Class: Ariadne or Caliph
- Withdrawn: 1871-1883, 1892
- Disposition: All scrapped

The Great Western Railway (GWR) Ariadne Class and Caliph Class were broad gauge 0-6-0 steam locomotives designed for goods train work by Daniel Gooch and are often referred to as his Standard Goods locomotives.

The class was introduced into service between May 1852 and March 1863, and were built in seven lots at Swindon with a total of 102 locomotives. All were withdrawn between 1871 and 1883 except for Europa, which was extensively rebuilt in 1869 and survived until the end of the GWR broad gauge in May 1892.

== Naming ==
Build date	Retire date	Name	Notes
1856	1877	Amphion	
1852	1879	Ariadne	
1857	1877	Avon	
1854	1879	Banshee	
1857	1872	Boyne	
1854	1874	Brutus	After withdrawal, Brutus was sold to the Bryndu Coal Company.
1854	1878	Caliph	
1854	1877	Cambyses	
1853	1871	Cato	
1854	1877	Ceres	
1862	1878	Champion	
1861	1878	Chronos	
1853	1871	Cicero	
1858	1872	Clyde	
1853	1875	Coquette	
1862	1880	Cossack	
1856	1872	Creon	
1853	1874	Cupid	
1854	1878	Cyprus	
1853	1877	Diana	
1857	1880	Esk	
1863	1883	Aethon	
1853	1892	Europa	This locomotive was extensively rebuilt at Swindon Works in 1869 and was thus the only member of this large class to survive until the end of the broad gauge on 21 May 1892.
1852	1874	Flirt	
1854	1872	Flora	This locomotive was sold in 1873 to M. Moxhan and Company.
1858	1878	Forth	
1854	1876	Geryon	
1852	1880	Giaour	
1861	1877	Gladiator	
1856	1879	Gyfellion	
1861	1878	Hades	
1852	1877	Hebe	
1853	1873	Hecuba	After it was withdrawn, this locomotive was sold to the Dinas Main Coal Company.
1857	1883	Humber	
1854	1874	Iris	
1854	1880	Janus	
1861	1876	Lagoon	
1852	1875	Leander	
1863	1881	Leonidas	
1855	1872	Liffey	
1863	1880	Luna	
1856	1879	Magi	
1857	1879	Mersey	
1855	1877	Metis	
1854	1875	Midas	
1853	1877	Minerva	
1853	1879	Monarch	
1853	1873	Nelson	After withdrawal, Nelson was sold to the Star Patent Fuel Company in Cardiff.
1855	1877	Nemesis	
1854	1881	Neptune	
1855	1877	Nero	
1854	1877	Nimrod	
1855	1873	Octavia	
1861	1879	Olympus	
1861	1877	Orpheus	
1854	1874	Orson	
1855	1877	Osiris	
1856	1879	Palas	
1863	1880	Pandora	
1856	1878	Panthea	
1852	1878	Pearl	
1855	1876	Pelops	
1861	1877	Pioneer	
1862	1875	Plutarch	
1855	1874	Plutus	
1859	1875	Plym	This locomotive was sold to V J Barton.
1853	1874	Psyche	
1862	1883	Regulus	
1853	1879	Remus	
1855	1872	Rhea	
1859	1877	Rhondda	
1853	1877	Romulus	
1854	1881	Ruby	
1854	1877	Salus	
1857	1873	Severn	
1861	1878	Severus	
1861	1880	Sirius	
1857	1880	Shannon	
1854	1878	Sibyl	
1854	1873	Sphinx	
1862	1878	Sylla	
1861	1877	Talbot	
1859	1880	Tamar	
1862	1876	Tantalus	
1858	1881	Tay	
1854	1877	Thames	
1862	1880	Theseus	
1853	1871	Trafalgar	
1857	1874	Tweed	
1859	1877	Tyne	
1855	1879	Typhon	
1853	1872	Ulysses	After withdrawal, Ulysses was sold to Gorham and Company.
1854	1879	Vesper	
1854	1879	Vixen	
1861	1877	Warhawk	
1861	1872	Warrior	
1859	1879	Wear	
1853	1873	Wellington	
1859	1879	Wye	
1863	1882	Xerxes	
1855	1877	Zetes	
1853	1874	Zina	
