= John Talbott =

John Talbott may refer to:

- John Talbott (mayor), former mayor of Spokane, Washington, USA
- John R. Talbott, American finance expert
- John H. Talbott, American actor and restaurateur
- John A. Talbott, American psychiatrist

== See also ==
- John Talbot (disambiguation)
