= Jeduthun =

Either of two biblical figures

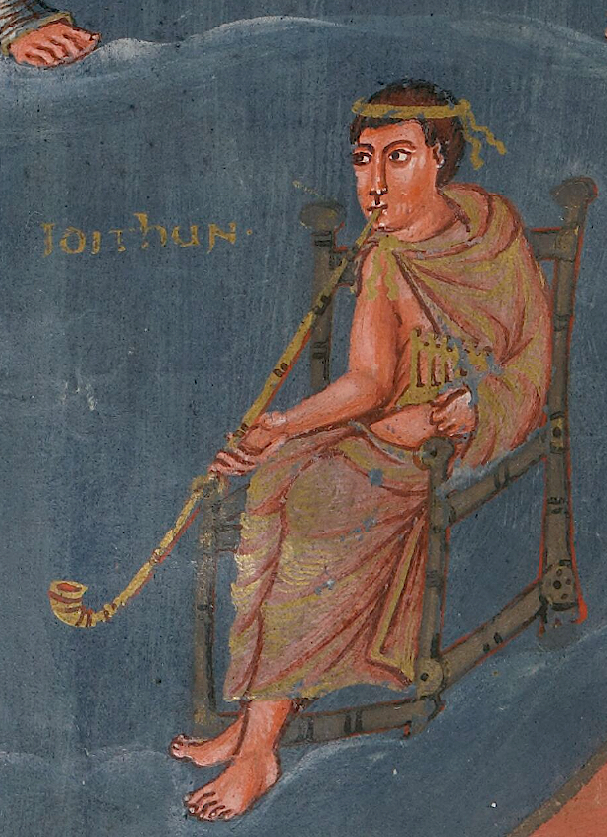
Circa 845 A.D., France. Jeduthun was depicted playing an apparent tibia curva. From the Vivian Bible.

Jeduthun - lauder; praising - the name of two men in the Bible.

- A Levite of the family of Merari, and one of the three masters of music appointed by David. (1 Chr. 16:41, 42; 25:1-6) His office was generally to preside over the music of the temple service. Jeduthun's name stands at the head of Psalms 39, 62 and 77, indicating probably that they were to be sung by his choir. Jeduthun and Heman were responsible for the sounding of the trumpets and cymbals and for the playing of the other instruments for sacred song. (1 Chronicles 16:42).
- A Levite whose son or descendant Obed-Edom was a gatekeeper at the time David brought the Ark of the Covenant to Jerusalem (1 Chronicles 16:1).
