= Talbut =

Talbut may refer to:

- Charles Talbut Onions (1873–1965), English grammarian
- John Talbut (1940–2020), English footballer
- Talbut (unicorn), a fictional leader in Kleo The Misfit Unicorn

== See also ==
- Talbot (surname)
