= Talbot River =

Talbot River is the name of numerous rivers:

In Australia

- Talbot River (Western Australia)

In Canada

- Talbot River (Ontario)
- Talbot River (Quebec)

In New Zealand

- Talbot River, New Zealand
