= Siobhán Talbot =

Irish businesswoman

Siobhan Talbot
- Born: 1964 (age 61–62); County Kilkenny, Ireland
- Occupation: CEO of Glanbia

Siobhan Talbot (born c.1964) is an Irish businesswoman, and the chief executive officer of Glanbia.

== Early life and education ==
Siobhán Talbot was born in Kilmoganny, County Kilkenny to a dairy farmer and a school teacher,. She went to University College Dublin where she graduated in 1984 with a Bachelor of Commerce, and a diploma in accounting in 1985.

== Career ==
Talbot worked in Ireland and then Australia in the accounting firm PricewaterhouseCoopers before returning to Ireland to work in Waterford Foods. She became the Glanbia group's Financial director before being appointed CEO in 2013.

In October 2018, Talbot was nominated to join the board of the construction group CRH plc.

In August 2019, Talbot was reappointed group managing director of Glanbia for 3 years with a 20% raise; some of the group's investors opposed the raise.

== Awards ==
- 2015: Award for Outstanding Achievement by the Ireland-US Council
- 2018: Business Person of the Month by the magazine Business & Finance

== Personal life ==
Talbot is married and has a son and a daughter. She has survived a cancer diagnosis in 2010.

== See also ==
- Gender representation on corporate boards of directors
