= George S. Talbot =

English clergyman and composer

George Thomas Surtees Talbot (13 August 1875 – 4 May 1918) was an English clergyman, musician, composer and writer.

The son of the Rev. Thomas Talbot, Vicar of Christ Church, Newcastle-on-Tyne, and Annie Surtees Marsden, Talbot was born in Durham and studied at Christ Church, Oxford. He was ordained deacon in 1901 and priest in 1902 and served as curate of St. Chad's, Far Headingley (1901–1903), before being appointed Vicar Choral of York Minster in 1904. In 1915 he was appointed Vicar of All Saints' Church, Huntington, in Yorkshire.

Talbot was a composer of church music, including settings of Psalm 150 ("O praise God in his holiness") and Psalm 62 ("My soul rests in God alone"). He was also the author of Hints on the study of the great composers. Selected lists of the music, etc. (1914) and Graded lists of the music of the great composers, a guide for teacher and students (1914).

On 14 February 1899 Talbot married Louisa Reese Talbot (1870–1933) at Bebington, Cheshire. He died at Huntington vicarage on 4 May 1918.
