= Mary Talbot =

Mary Talbot may refer to:

- Mary Anne Talbot (1778–1808), English woman who posed as male during the French Revolutionary Wars
- Mary Armine (?–1676), née Talbot, English benefactress
- Mary M. Talbot (born 1954), British scholar, and author of Dotter of Her Father's Eyes
- Mary Talbot, Countess of Northumberland (?–1572), English courtier who married Anne Boleyn's former suitor, Henry Percy
- Mary Talbot, Countess of Shrewsbury (1556–1632), English daughter of Bess of Hardwick
- Mary Talbot (entomologist) (1903–1990), American entomologist
- Mary Talbot Herbert, Countess of Pembroke, (c. 1594–1649), English daughter of the above
- Mary Talbot (WRNS officer) (1922–2012), British naval officer
