= Talbot, Michigan =

- Unincorporated community
- Location within the state of Michigan
- Coordinates: 45°30′38″N 87°35′51″W
- Country: United States
- State: Michigan
- County: Menominee
- Township: Daggett
- Elevation: 728 ft (222 m)
- Time zone: UTC-6 (Central (CST))
  - Summer (DST): UTC-5 (CDT)
- ZIP code(s): 49821
- Area code: 906
- GNIS feature ID: 1617889

Talbot is an unincorporated community in Menominee County, in the U.S. state of Michigan.

== History ==
A post office was established at Talbot in 1883, and remained in operation until it was discontinued in 1905. The community was named for Matthew Talbot, 30th Governor of Georgia.
