= George Talbot (New Zealand cricketer) =

New Zealand cricketer

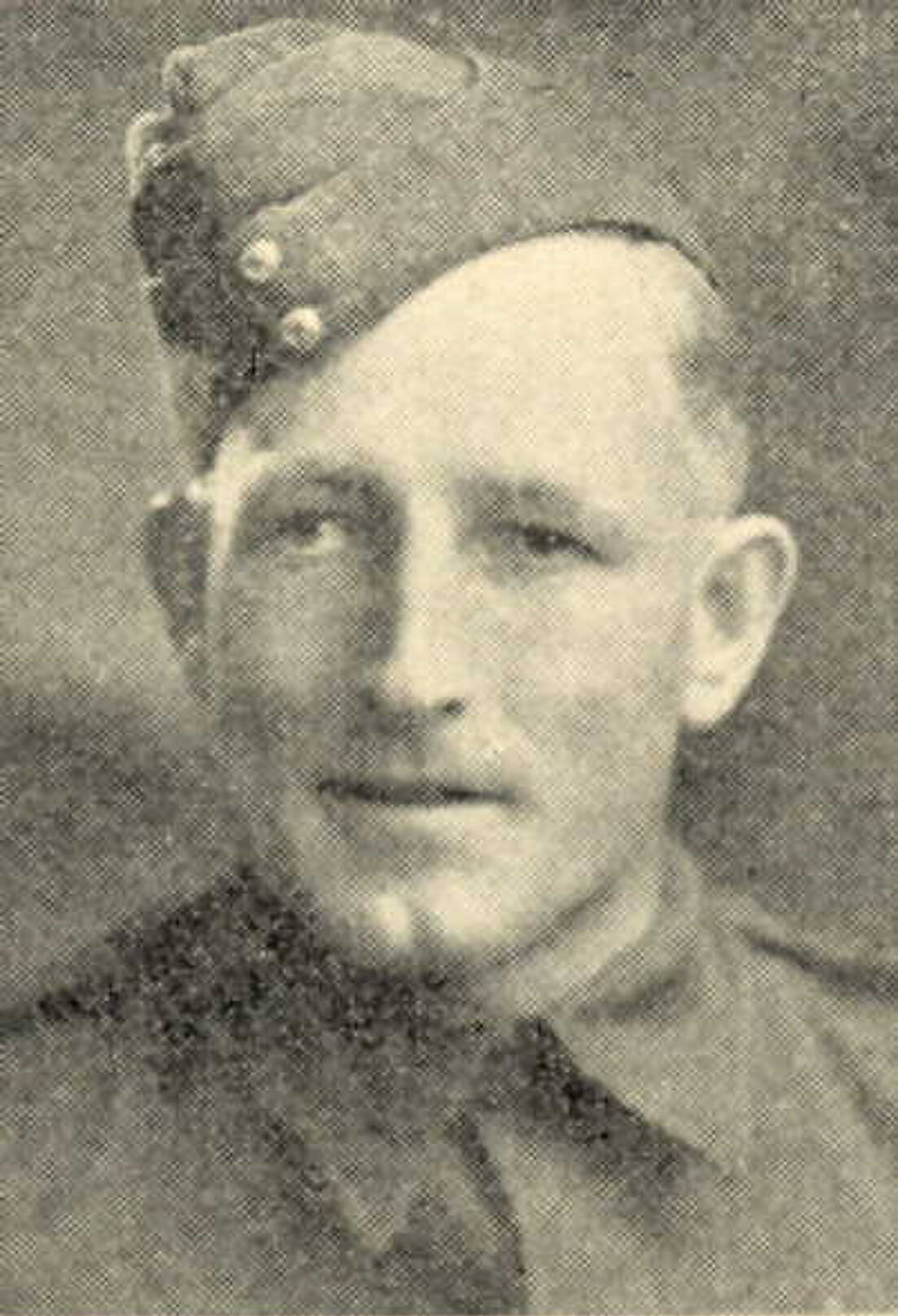

Personal information
- Full name: George Logan Talbot
- Born: 2 April 1907; Christchurch, Canterbury, New Zealand
- Died: 15 December 1943 (aged 36); Orsogna, Fascist Italy
- Batting: Right-handed
- Bowling: Right-arm medium

Domestic team information
- Years: Team
- 1930: Canterbury

Career statistics
Competition	First-class
Matches	1
Runs scored	–
Batting average	–
100s/50s	–/–
Top score	–
Balls bowled	28
Wickets	3
Bowling average	9.33
5 wickets in innings	0
10 wickets in match	0
Best bowling	2/24
Catches/stumpings	1/0
- Source: Cricinfo, 4 August 2020

George Logan Talbot (2 April 1907 – 15 December 1943) was a New Zealand first-class cricketer and soldier. He appeared in one Plunket Shield match for Canterbury in 1930 and was killed during the Second World War in 1943.

== Life and military career ==
Talbot was born on 2 April 1907 in Christchurch. He appeared in one first-class Plunket Shield match for Canterbury against Otago between 28 February and 1 March 1930. During the match, which took place at Lancaster Park, Talbot used his right-arm medium bowling to score 3 wickets.

Talbot worked as a storeman before enlisting in the New Zealand Expeditionary Force during the Second World War. Rising to the rank of corporal in the New Zealand Armoured Corps, he was killed in action on 15 December 1943 when his tank was knocked out by a German 8.8 cm anti-tank gun. Talbot is buried at the Sangro River War Cemetery.
