= Edward Allen Talbot =

Canadian settler

Edward Allen Talbot (b. 1796 – d. January 6, 1839), the eldest son of Richard Talbot was a strong leader in the immigration venture that his father led to Canada in 1818.

He had a career that spanned many interests. Neither he nor his brother, John Talbot was suited for the pioneer life of Upper Canada. Both left London Township in 1820 to pursue other fields.

Edward was, at various times, an inventor, a militia officer, and schoolmaster. He was also an author, and journalist. His careers took him back to Europe, a return trip to Canada and to the United States. In 1824 he self-published lively account of his voyage from Montreal to Middlesex County (London, Ontario) in Upper Canada, in the form of 35 letters which revealed him as a keen observer of human nature and master of a wide range of eclectic topics.

He died in Lockport, New York and was interred in a pauper's grave. His talents had been many and widely recognized while his inability to manage his personal life and his health led him to an early death in sad circumstances.
