= Talbot (given name) =

Talbot is a given name. Notable people with the name include:

- Talbot Badger (fl. 1621–1656), English politician
- Talbot Bowes (1560–1638), English politician
- Talbot Dilworth-Harrison (1886–1975), Archdeacon of Chesterfield
- Talbot Duckmanton (1921–1995), Australian broadcaster and administrator
- Talbot Hamlin (1889–1956), American architect, architectural historian, writer, and educator
- Talbot Hobbs (1864–1938), Australian architect
- Talbot Hunter (1884–1928), Canadian college hockey, lacrosse, and soccer coach
- Talbot Jennings (1894–1985), American playwright and screenwriter
- Talbot Lewis (1877–1956), English cricketer
- Talbot Mundy (1879–1940), English-American writer
- Talbot O'Farrell (1878–1952), English singer and actor
- Talbot Mercer Papineau (1883–1917), Canadian lawyer
- Talbot Pendleton (fl. 1910), American football player
- Talbot Pepys (1583–1666), English politician
- Talbot Peterson (fl. 1964–1972), American politician
- Talbot Baines Reed (1852–1893), English writer
- Talbot Rothwell (1916–1981), English screenwriter
- Talbot Smith (1899–1978), American politician
- Talbot Yelverton, 1st Earl of Sussex (1690–1731), English peer and member of the House of Lords
