= Psalm 77 =

77th psalm in the Book of Psalms

- "I cried unto God with my voice"
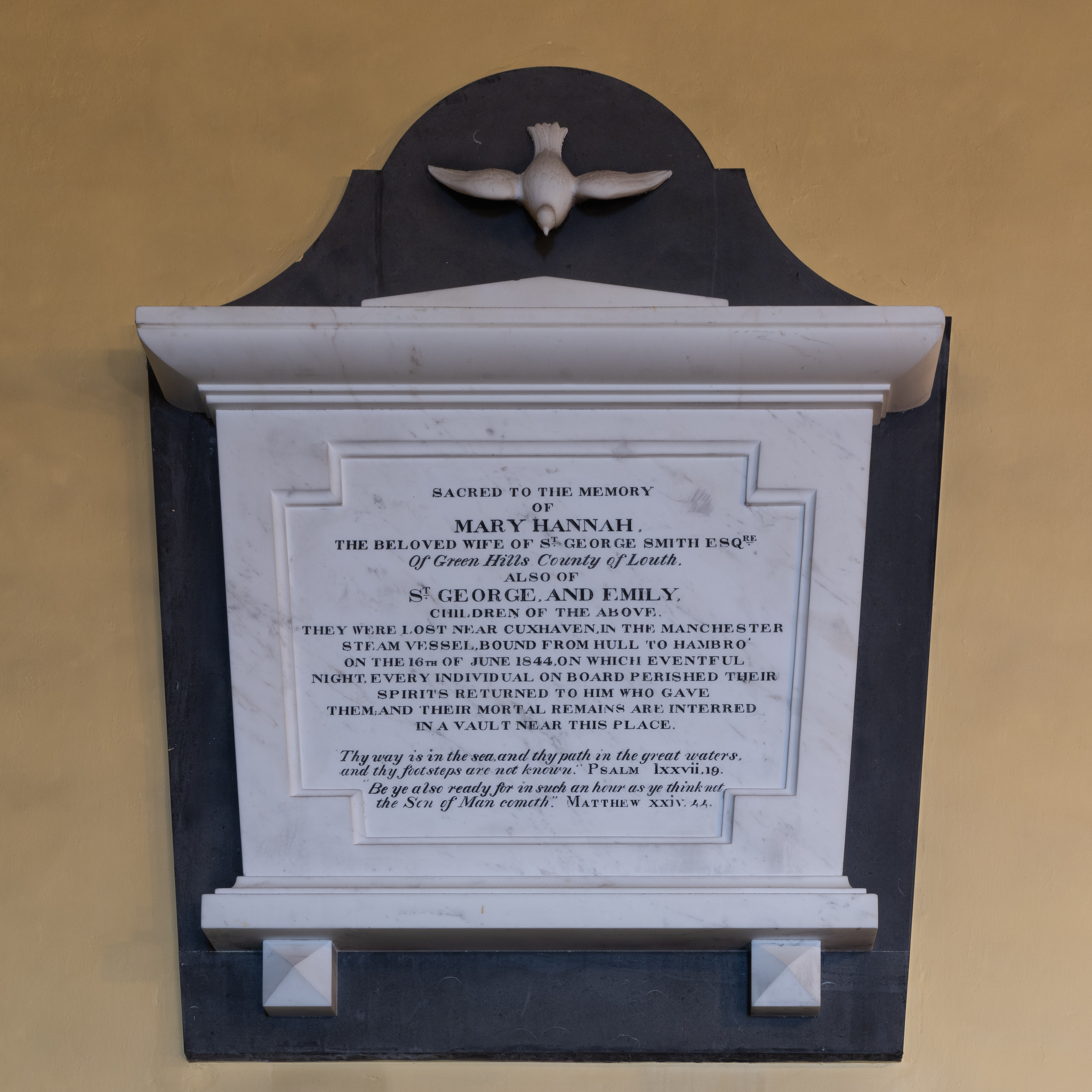
- Verse 19 of Psalm 77 on a grave stone in Ireland
- Other name: Psalmus 76; "Voce mea ad Dominum clamavi"
- Language: Hebrew (original)

Psalm 77
- ← Psalm 76 Psalm 78 →
- Book: Book of Psalms
- Hebrew Bible part: Ketuvim
- Order in the Hebrew part: 1
- Category: Sifrei Emet
- Christian Bible part: Old Testament
- Order in the Christian part: 19

Psalm 77 is the 77th psalm of the Book of Psalms, beginning in English in the King James Version: "I cried unto God with my voice, even unto God with my voice; and he gave ear unto me."

In the slightly different numbering system used in the Greek Septuagint and Latin Vulgate translations of the Bible, this psalm is Psalm 76. In Latin, it is known as "Voce mea ad Dominum clamavi".

The psalm forms a regular part of Jewish, Catholic, Lutheran, Anglican, and other Protestant liturgies. It has been set to music.

== Content ==
The psalm begins with a cry of distress: the psalmist has been experiencing profound difficulties, and his cries to God appear to have been ignored; only his memories of the past seem to bring anything even resembling joy. However, the psalmist then remembers God's integrity and realises that the failure of his hopes is the result of misplaced expectations of God's actions, rather than God's failure to act. Recalling God's actions in the past and his rule even over the natural world, he concludes with praise of "the God who performs miracles" (verse 14).

== Interpretations ==
Coming from an evangelical Protestant perspective, Charles Spurgeon deemed the psalm the words of a single individual, in contrast to others who had interpreted it as representing the voice of the nation: "It utterly destroys all the beauty, all the tenderness and depth of feeling in the opening portion, if we suppose that the people are introduced speaking in the first person." John Calvin observed parallels to certain other biblical poetry, such as Psalm 118:18 and the hymn in the final chapter of Habakkuk: according to Calvin, the three share a common theme of becoming aware of ultimate divine deliverance from seemingly intractable terrors.

== Uses ==
=== Judaism ===
Psalm 77 is recited along with Parshat HaChodesh and is recited on the third through sixth days of Sukkot.

It is one of the ten Psalms of the Tikkun HaKlali of Rebbe Nachman of Breslov.

=== Book of Common Prayer ===
In the Church of England's Book of Common Prayer, this psalm is appointed to be read on the morning of the fifteenth day of the month.

=== Song ===
Peter van Essen's Dutch song, In het diepst van de nacht is based on Psalm 77.

== Musical settings ==
Heinrich Schütz set Psalm 77 in a metred version in German, "Ich ruf zu Gott mit meiner Stimm", SWV 174, as part of the Becker Psalter, first published in 1628.

== Text ==
The following table shows the Hebrew text of the Psalm with vowels, alongside the Koine Greek text in the Septuagint and the English translation from the King James Version. Note that the meaning can slightly differ between these versions, as the Septuagint and the Masoretic Text come from different textual traditions. (Note: A 1917 translation directly from Hebrew to English by the Jewish Publication Society can be found here or here, and an 1844 translation directly from the Septuagint by L. C. L. Brenton can be found here. Both translations are in the public domain.) In the Septuagint, this psalm is numbered Psalm 76.

#	Hebrew	English	Greek
(Note: In the Jewish verse numbering, the ascription of this psalm is verse 1, and the rest of the psalm begins from verse 2. However, the Christian verse numbering does not count the ascription.)	לַמְנַצֵּ֥חַ עַֽל־[יְדוּת֗וּן] (ידיתון) לְאָסָ֥ף מִזְמֽוֹר׃	(To the chief Musician, to Jeduthun, A Psalm of Asaph.)	Εἰς τὸ τέλος, ὑπὲρ ᾿Ιδιθούν· ψαλμὸς τῷ ᾿Ασάφ. -
1	קוֹלִ֣י אֶל־אֱלֹהִ֣ים וְאֶצְעָ֑קָה קוֹלִ֥י אֶל־אֱ֝לֹהִ֗ים וְהַאֲזִ֥ין אֵלָֽי׃	I cried unto God with my voice, even unto God with my voice; and he gave ear unto me.	ΦΩΝῌ μου πρὸς Κύριον ἐκέκραξα, φωνῇ μου πρὸς τὸν Θεόν, καὶ προσέσχε μοι.
2	בְּי֥וֹם צָרָתִי֮ אֲדֹנָ֢י דָּ֫רָ֥שְׁתִּי יָדִ֤י ׀ לַ֣יְלָה נִ֭גְּרָה וְלֹ֣א תָפ֑וּג מֵאֲנָ֖ה הִנָּחֵ֣ם נַפְשִֽׁי׃	In the day of my trouble I sought the Lord: my sore ran in the night, and ceased not: my soul refused to be comforted.	ἐν ἡμέρᾳ θλίψεώς μου τὸν Θεὸν ἐξεζήτησα, ταῖς χερσί μου νυκτὸς ἐναντίον αὐτοῦ, καὶ οὐκ ἠπατήθην· ἀπηνήνατο παρακληθῆναι ἡ ψυχή μου.
3	אֶזְכְּרָ֣ה אֱלֹהִ֣ים וְאֶהֱמָ֑יָה אָשִׂ֓יחָה ׀ וְתִתְעַטֵּ֖ף רוּחִ֣י סֶֽלָה׃	I remembered God, and was troubled: I complained, and my spirit was overwhelmed. Selah.	ἐμνήσθην τοῦ Θεοῦ καὶ εὐφράνθην· ἠδολέσχησα, καὶ ὠλιγοψύχησε τὸ πνεῦμά μου. (διάψαλμα).
4	אָ֭חַזְתָּ שְׁמֻר֣וֹת עֵינָ֑י נִ֝פְעַ֗מְתִּי וְלֹ֣א אֲדַבֵּֽר׃	Thou holdest mine eyes waking: I am so troubled that I cannot speak.	προκατελάβοντο φυλακὰς οἱ ὀφθαλμοί μου, ἐταράχθην καὶ οὐκ ἐλάλησα.
5	חִשַּׁ֣בְתִּי יָמִ֣ים מִקֶּ֑דֶם שְׁ֝נ֗וֹת עוֹלָמִֽים׃	I have considered the days of old, the years of ancient times.	διελογισάμην ἡμέρας ἀρχαίας, καὶ ἔτη αἰώνια ἐμνήσθην καὶ ἐμελέτησα·
6	אֶ֥זְכְּרָ֥ה נְגִינָתִ֗י בַּ֫לָּ֥יְלָה עִם־לְבָבִ֥י אָשִׂ֑יחָה וַיְחַפֵּ֥שׂ רוּחִֽי׃	I call to remembrance my song in the night: I commune with mine own heart: and my spirit made diligent search.	νυκτὸς μετὰ τῆς καρδίας μου ἠδολέσχουν, καὶ ἔσκαλλε τὸ πνεῦμά μου.
7	הַ֭לְעוֹלָמִים יִזְנַ֥ח ׀ אֲדֹנָ֑י וְלֹא־יֹסִ֖יף לִרְצ֣וֹת עֽוֹד׃	Will the Lord cast off for ever? and will he be favourable no more?	μὴ εἰς τοὺς αἰῶνας ἀπώσεται Κύριος καὶ οὐ προσθήσει τοῦ εὐδοκῆσαι ἔτι;
8	הֶאָפֵ֣ס לָנֶ֣צַח חַסְדּ֑וֹ גָּ֥מַר אֹ֝֗מֶר לְדֹ֣ר וָדֹֽר׃	Is his mercy clean gone for ever? doth his promise fail for evermore?	ἢ εἰς τέλος τὸ ἔλεος αὐτοῦ ἀποκόψει; συνετέλεσε ῥῆμα ἀπὸ γενεᾶς εἰς γενεάν;
9	הֲשָׁכַ֣ח חַנּ֣וֹת אֵ֑ל אִם־קָפַ֥ץ בְּ֝אַ֗ף רַחֲמָ֥יו סֶֽלָה׃	Hath God forgotten to be gracious? hath he in anger shut up his tender mercies? Selah.	μὴ ἐπιλήσεται τοῦ οἰκτειρῆσαι ὁ Θεός; ἢ συνέξει ἐν τῇ ὀργῇ αὐτοῦ τοὺς οἰκτιρμοὺς αὐτοῦ; (διάψαλμα).
10	וָ֭אֹמַר חַלּ֣וֹתִי הִ֑יא שְׁ֝נ֗וֹת יְמִ֣ין עֶלְיֽוֹן׃	And I said, This is my infirmity: but I will remember the years of the right hand of the most High.	καὶ εἶπα· νῦν ἠρξάμην, αὕτη ἡ ἀλλοίωσις τῆς δεξιᾶς τοῦ ῾Υψίστου.
11	(אזכיר) [אֶזְכּ֥וֹר] מַעַלְלֵי־יָ֑הּ כִּֽי־אֶזְכְּרָ֖ה מִקֶּ֣דֶם פִּלְאֶֽךָ׃	I will remember the works of the LORD: surely I will remember thy wonders of old.	ἐμνήσθην τῶν ἔργων Κυρίου, ὅτι μνησθήσομαι ἀπὸ τῆς ἀρχῆς τῶν θαυμασίων σου
12	וְהָגִ֥יתִי בְכׇל־פׇּעֳלֶ֑ךָ וּֽבַעֲלִ֖ילוֹתֶ֣יךָ אָשִֽׂיחָה׃	I will meditate also of all thy work, and talk of thy doings.	καὶ μελετήσω ἐν πᾶσι τοῖς ἔργοις σου καὶ ἐν τοῖς ἐπιτηδεύμασί σου ἀδολεσχήσω.
13	אֱ֭לֹהִים בַּקֹּ֣דֶשׁ דַּרְכֶּ֑ךָ מִי־אֵ֥ל גָּ֝ד֗וֹל כֵּאלֹהִֽים׃	Thy way, O God, is in the sanctuary: who is so great a God as our God?	ὁ Θεός, ἐν τῷ ἁγίῳ ἡ ὁδός σου· τίς Θεὸς μέγας ὡς ὁ Θεὸς ἡμῶν;
14	אַתָּ֣ה הָ֭אֵל עֹ֣שֵׂה פֶ֑לֶא הוֹדַ֖עְתָּ בָעַמִּ֣ים עֻזֶּֽךָ׃	Thou art the God that doest wonders: thou hast declared thy strength among the people.	σὺ εἶ ὁ Θεὸς ὁ ποιῶν θαυμάσια, ἐγνώρισας ἐν τοῖς λαοῖς τὴν δύναμίν σου·
15	גָּאַ֣לְתָּ בִּזְר֣וֹעַ עַמֶּ֑ךָ בְּנֵֽי־יַעֲקֹ֖ב וְיוֹסֵ֣ף סֶֽלָה׃	Thou hast with thine arm redeemed thy people, the sons of Jacob and Joseph. Selah.	ἐλυτρώσω ἐν τῷ βραχίονί σου τὸν λαόν σου, τοὺς υἱοὺς ᾿Ιακὼβ καὶ ᾿Ιωσήφ. (διάψαλμα).
16	רָ֘א֤וּךָ מַּ֨יִם ׀ אֱֽלֹהִ֗ים רָא֣וּךָ מַּ֣יִם יָחִ֑ילוּ אַ֝֗ף יִרְגְּז֥וּ תְהֹמֽוֹת׃	The waters saw thee, O God, the waters saw thee; they were afraid: the depths also were troubled.	εἴδοσάν σε ὕδατα, ὁ Θεός, εἴδοσάν σε ὕδατα καὶ ἐφοβήθησαν, ἐταράχθησαν ἄβυσσοι,
17	זֹ֤רְמוּ מַ֨יִם ׀ עָב֗וֹת ק֭וֹל נָֽתְנ֣וּ שְׁחָקִ֑ים אַף־חֲ֝צָצֶ֗יךָ יִתְהַלָּֽכוּ׃	The clouds poured out water: the skies sent out a sound: thine arrows also went abroad.	πλῆθος ἤχους ὑδάτων, φωνὴν ἔδωκαν αἱ νεφέλαι, καὶ γὰρ τὰ βέλη σου διαπορεύονται·
18	ק֤וֹל רַֽעַמְךָ֨ ׀ בַּגַּלְגַּ֗ל הֵאִ֣ירוּ בְרָקִ֣ים תֵּבֵ֑ל רָגְזָ֖ה וַתִּרְעַ֣שׁ הָאָֽרֶץ׃	The voice of thy thunder was in the heaven: the lightnings lightened the world: the earth trembled and shook.	φωνὴ τῆς βροντῆς σου ἐν τῷ τροχῷ, ἔφαναν αἱ ἀστραπαί σου τῇ οἰκουμένῃ, ἐσαλεύθη καὶ ἔντρομος ἐγενήθη ἡ γῆ.
19	בַּיָּ֤ם דַּרְכֶּ֗ךָ (ושביליך) [וּֽ֭שְׁבִילְךָ] בְּמַ֣יִם רַבִּ֑ים וְ֝עִקְּבוֹתֶ֗יךָ לֹ֣א נֹדָֽעוּ׃	Thy way is in the sea, and thy path in the great waters, and thy footsteps are not known.	ἐν τῇ θαλάσσῃ αἱ ὁδοί σου, καὶ αἱ τρίβοι σου ἐν ὕδασι πολλοῖς, καὶ τὰ ἴχνη σου οὐ γνωσθήσονται.
20	נָחִ֣יתָ כַצֹּ֣אן עַמֶּ֑ךָ בְּֽיַד־מֹשֶׁ֥ה וְאַהֲרֹֽן׃	Thou leddest thy people like a flock by the hand of Moses and Aaron.	ὡδήγησας ὡς πρόβατα τὸν λαόν σου ἐν χειρὶ Μωϋσῆ καὶ ᾿Ααρών.
