= Hilary Talbot =

Sir Hilary Gwynne Talbot (22 January 1912 – 24 May 2004) was a British barrister and judge. He was a High Court judge, sitting in the Queen's Bench Division, from 1968 to 1983.
