= James Talbot =

James Talbot may refer to:

- James Talbot (priest) (1726–1790), last English Roman Catholic priest to be indicted for saying Mass
- James Talbot (Jacobite) (died 1691), Irish Jacobite
- James Talbot (bowls), Northern Irish lawn and indoor bowler
- James Talbot (rapist), Jesuit priest, teacher, coach, convicted of multiple rapes over a period of decades
- James A. Talbot (1879–1936), American businessman
- James Talbot (footballer), Irish footballer
- James Talbot, 4th Baron Talbot of Malahide (1805–1883), Anglo-Irish Liberal politician and amateur archaeologist
- James Theodore Talbot (1825–1862), officer in the United States Army
- James Talbot (rower), Australian Paralympic rower
- Jamie Talbot (born 1960), English jazz alto saxophonist
- Jamie Talbot (singer), Danish singer
