= Michael Talbot =

Michael Talbot may refer to:

- Michael Talbot (musicologist) (born 1943), British composer, musicologist and author
- Michael Talbot (author) (1953–1992), American author
- Michael Kirk Talbot (born 1969), member of Louisiana House of Representatives
- Mick Talbot, English musician

== See also ==
- John Michael Talbot (born 1954), singer and guitarist
- Michael Talbott (born 1955), American actor
