= Richard Talbot (colonist) =

Irish soldier

Richard Talbot (1772 – 29 January 1853), was a soldier and subsequently a promoter of immigration to Canada. He was from County Tipperary in Ireland.

He left Ireland with 230 potential settlers in June 1818. They sailed on the Brunswick from Cork and arrived at Quebec on 29 July. Because many people deserted his leadership, he eventually brought only about 75 settlers to the newly opened London Township in Upper Canada.

Although the settlement itself was a success, Talbot himself did not prosper in the ways he expected. His two eldest sons, Edward Allen Talbot and John Talbot, left the area to seek other opportunities.

Talbot resided in London Township until his death.
