= John Talbot (reformer) =

Canadian journalist (1797–1874)

- Born: 21 September 1797; Cloughjordan, County Tipperary, Ireland
- Died: 22 September 1874 (aged 77); Robinson, Illinois, U.S.

John Talbot (21 September 1797 – 22 September 1874) was an Irish born Canadian schoolmaster, journalist, and merchant.

== Biography ==
Born in Cloughjordan, County Tipperary, Ireland, he arrived in Upper Canada in 1818. He was part of a group brought out by his father, Richard Talbot. in order to obtain a large land grant. This did not occur and John, after a number of years of wandering, became a schoolmaster in London Township in 1830.

It is believed that Talbot became a Reformer because of the failed land grant which he considered to be his right.

He died on 22 September 1874 in Robinson, Illinois.
