= GWR 1076 Class =

Class of tank locomotive used by the GWR

GWR 1076 class
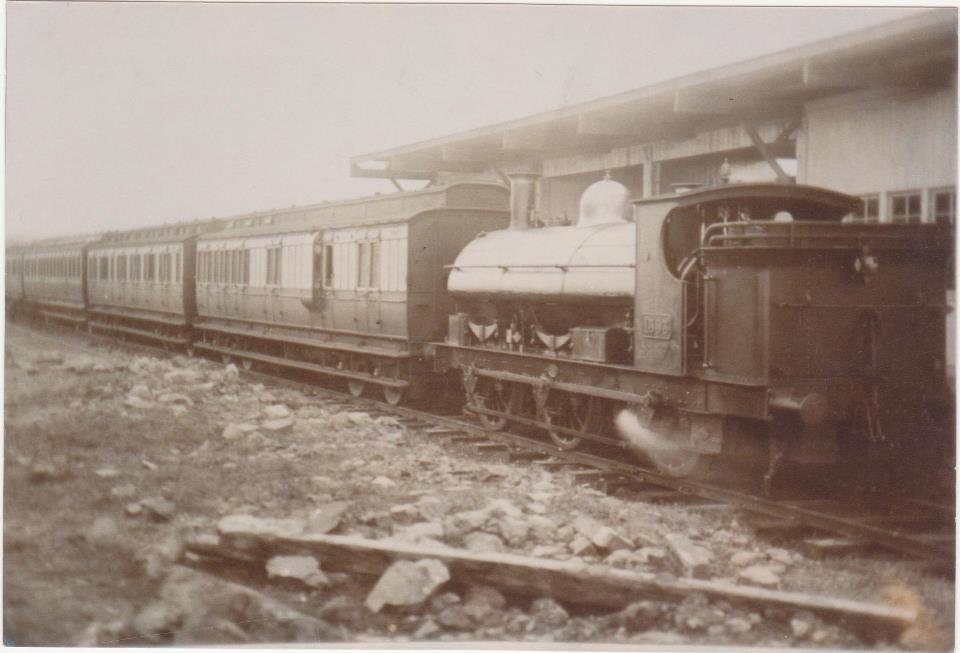
- 1593 with a boat train at Hakin Docks station, Milford Haven in 1889
Type and origin
- Power type: Steam
- Designer: Joseph Armstrong
- Builder: Swindon Works
- Build date: 1870–1881
- Total produced: 266
Specifications
- Configuration
  - Whyte: 0-6-0T or 0-6-0ST, later 0-6-0PT
- Gauge: 4 ft 8 1/2 in (1,435 mm) standard gauge and 7 ft 1/4 in (2,140 mm)
- Driver dia.: 4 ft 7 1/2 in (1,410 mm)
- Wheelbase: 15 ft 8 in (4,775 mm)
- Fuel type: Coal
- Cylinder size: 17 in × 24 in (432 mm × 610 mm) dia × stroke
Career
- Operators: Great Western Railway
- Class: 1076 Class

The 1076 Class were 266 double framed 0-6-0T locomotives built by the Great Western Railway between 1870 and 1881; the last one, number 1287, was withdrawn in 1946. They are often referred to as the Buffalo Class following the naming of locomotive 1134.

== History ==
These large tank locomotives, with their 4-foot-7 1/2-inch (1,410 mm) wheels and 17-by-24-inch (432 mm × 610 mm) dia × stroke cylinders were capable of working trains on the main line. They followed on from George Armstrong's 1016 Class built from 1867, themselves derived from the earlier 302 Class of Joseph Armstrong, and were perpetuated by his successor William Dean until 1881. Modernised saddle tank locomotives of similar size were then produced in the 1813 Class.

The first six were built with side tanks. The following locomotives had saddle tanks covering their boilers and fireboxes, but from 1874 longer saddle tank extending to the front of the smokebox were the norm. All the earlier locomotives were eventually fitted with these larger tanks. Most were reconstructed with pannier tanks from 1911 onwards.

The first locomotives had just a spectacle plate to give protection for the crew, but then small cabs, open at the back, were fitted. Later on most of the surviving locomotives were given full cabs so that there was protection when running in reverse.

Other changes to various locomotives over their long lives were Belpaire fireboxes, enlarged coal bunkers, and even superheaters. One or two were fitted with spark-arresting chimneys. 21 were fitted for working autotrains.

Table of orders and numbers
Year	Quantity	Lot No.	Works Nos.	Locomotive numbers	Notes
1870	6	22	245–250	1172–1177	renumbered 1076–1081 in 1870
1872–73	30	30	402–431	727–756	
1874	20	37	523–542	947–966	
1874–75	20	39	543–562	1134–1153	
1875	20	40	603–622	1166–1185	
1876–77	20	43	663–682	1228–1247	Ran as broad-gauge locomotives from new (nos. 1228–37) or from 1887–88 (remainder) until 1891–93, see later
1877	20	44	683–702	1248–1267	Nos. 1248–57 ran as broad-gauge locomotives from 1887–88 until 1892–93, see later
1877–78	30	45	703–732	1268–1297	
1878–79	20	48	754–773	1561–1580	Ran as broad-gauge locomotives from new (nos. 1561–5) or from 1884 (remainder) until 1892–93, see later
1879	20	49	774–793	1581–1600	
1879–80	20	50	794–813	1601–1620	
1880	20	52	824–843	1621–1640	
1880–81	20	55	846–865	1641–1660	

=== Broad gauge conversions ===
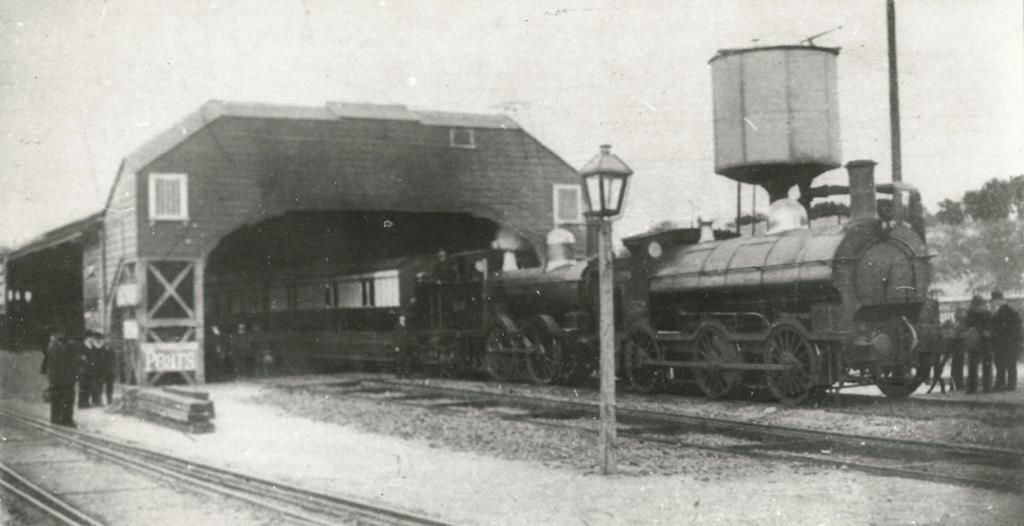
Locomotive 1256 with the last broad gauge service at Truro in 1892

Ten locomotives were built in 1876 with broad gauge wheels outside the standard double frames. Five more broad gauge locomotives were built in 1878, while from 1884 another 35 were converted from standard gauge to broad. All were eventually converted back to standard gauge.

1256 was one of a pair of locomotives that worked the last broad gauge train from Penzance back to Swindon for conversion on 20 May 1892.

Locomotives built new as broad gauge are denoted in this list by an asterisk*.

- 1228 * (1876–1892)
- 1229 * (1876–1892)
- 1230 * (1876–1892)
- 1231 * (1876–1892)
- 1232 * (1876–1892)
- 1233 * (1876–1892)
- 1234 * (1876–1892)
- 1235 * (1876–1892)
- 1236 * (1876–1892)
- 1237 * (1876–1893)
- 1238 (1888–1892)
- 1239 (1887–1892)
- 1250 (1888–1893)
- 1251 (1887–1891)
- 1252 (1887–1892)
- 1253 (1888–1892)
- 1254 (1888–1892)
- 1255 (1888–1893)
- 1256 (1887–1892)
- 1257 (1887–1892)
- 1258 (1887–1892)
- 1259 (1887–1892)
- 1260 (1888–1892)
- 1261 (1888–1892)
- 1262 (1888–1893)
- 1263 (1887–1892)
- 1264 (1887–1893)
- 1265 (1888–1893)
- 1266 (1887–1892)
- 1267 (1887–1893)
- 1561 * (1878–1892)
- 1562 * (1878–1893)
- 1563 * (1878–1892)
- 1564 * (1878–1893)
- 1565 * (1878–1892)
- 1566 (1884–1892)
- 1567 (1884–1892)
- 1568 (1884–1892)
- 1569 (1884–1892)
- 1570 (1884–1892)
- 1571 (1884–1892)
- 1572 (1884–1892)
- 1573 (1884–1892)
- 1574 (1884–1892)
- 1575 (1884–1892)
- 1576 (1884–1892)
- 1577 (1884–1892)
- 1578 (1884–1893)
- 1579 (1884–1892)
- 1580 (1884–1893)

=== Named locomotive ===
- 1134 Buffalo
  The reason this locomotive was given a name is unclear. It was certainly named within a few years of construction but there was already a Buffalo 0-6-0ST which gave its name to the South Devon Railway Buffalo class. The nameplate was removed from 1134 in 1914 when it was fitted with its pannier tanks. The name itself is that of a strong animal, the Buffalo.

=== Locomotives sold ===
Two locomotives were sold to the Neath and Brecon Railway:

- 1563 became N&BR 14 in 1911 and returned to the Great Western Railway in 1922
- 1591 became N&BR 15 in 1912 and returned to the Great Western Railway in 1922 was withdrawn before being given it number back

Five locomotives were sold to the Rhondda and Swansea Bay Railway:

- 1660 became R&SBR 2 in 1919 and returned to the Great Western Railway in 1922
- 1652 became R&SBR 31 in 1912 and returned to the Great Western Railway in 1922
- 728 became R&SBR 32 in 1915 and returned to the Great Western Railway in 1922
- 957 became R&SBR 33 in 1914 and returned to the Great Western Railway in 1922
- 1167 became R&SBR 34 in 1919 and returned to the Great Western Railway in 1922

== List of locomotives ==
=== 727 to 756 ===
Originally fitted with short saddle tanks.

- 727 (1872–1929, pannier tanks fitted 1922)
- 728 (1872–1929, pannier tanks fitted 1923)
- 729 (1872–1910)
- 730 (1872–1930, pannier tanks fitted 1922)
- 731 (1872–1929, pannier tanks fitted 1921)
- 732 (1872–1932, pannier tanks fitted 1925)
- 733 (1872–1934, pannier tanks fitted 1922)
- 734 (1872–1931, pannier tanks fitted 1926)
- 735 (1873–1930, pannier tanks fitted 1921)
- 736 (1873–1932, pannier tanks fitted 1912)
- 737 (1873–1932, pannier tanks fitted 1927)
- 738 (1873–1936, pannier tanks fitted 1917)
- 739 (1873–1930, pannier tanks fitted 1925)
- 740 (1873–1929, pannier tanks fitted 1914)
- 741 (1873–1931, pannier tanks fitted 1924)
- 742 (1873–1919)
- 743 (1873–1934, pannier tanks fitted 1916)
- 744 (1873–1932, pannier tanks fitted 1916)
- 745 (1873–1933, pannier tanks fitted 1925)
- 746 (1873–1927, pannier tanks fitted 1916)
- 747 (1873–1911)
- 748 (1873–1932, pannier tanks fitted 1919)
- 749 (1873–1928, pannier tanks fitted 1912)
- 750 (1873–1930, pannier tanks fitted 1920)
- 751 (1873–1931, pannier tanks fitted 1915)
- 752 (1873–1934, pannier tanks fitted 1914)
- 753 (1873–1935, pannier tanks fitted 1924)
- 754 (1873–1911)
- 755 (1873–1929, pannier tanks fitted 1918)
- 756 (1873–1928, pannier tanks fitted 1912)

=== 947 to 966 ===
Originally fitted with short saddle tanks.

- 947 (1874–1932, pannier tanks fitted 1915)
- 948 (1874–1915)
- 949 (1874–1934, pannier tanks fitted 1922)
- 950 (1874–1932, pannier tanks fitted 1912)
- 951 (1874–1930, pannier tanks fitted 1920)
- 952 (1874–1931, pannier tanks fitted 1920)
- 953 (1874–1929, pannier tanks fitted 1923)
- 954 (1874–1931, pannier tanks fitted 1919)
- 955 (1874–1931, pannier tanks fitted 1916)
- 956 (1874–1930, pannier tanks fitted 1916)
- 957 (1874–1932, pannier tanks fitted 1922)
- 958 (1874–1933, pannier tanks fitted 1915)
- 959 (1874–1930, pannier tanks fitted 1926)
- 960 (1874–1932, pannier tanks fitted 1924)
- 961 (1874–1930, pannier tanks fitted 1916)
- 962 (1874–1931, pannier tanks fitted 1927)
- 963 (1874–1936, pannier tanks fitted 1922)
- 964 (1874–1929, pannier tanks fitted 1916)
- 965 (1874–1930, pannier tanks fitted 1914)
- 966 (1874–1929, pannier tanks fitted 1919)

=== 1076 to 1081 ===
Originally fitted with side tanks.

- 1076 (1870–1930, pannier tanks fitted 1926)
- 1077 (1870–1931, pannier tanks fitted 1918)
- 1078 (1870–1928, pannier tanks fitted 1923)
- 1079 (1870–1930, pannier tanks fitted 1913)
- 1080 (1870–1934, pannier tanks fitted 1927)
- 1081 (1870–1931, pannier tanks fitted 1919)

=== 1134 to 1153 ===
Most were originally fitted with short saddle tanks.

- 1134 (1874–1934, pannier tanks fitted 1914)
- 1135 (1874–1931, pannier tanks fitted 1914)
- 1136 (1874–1935, pannier tanks fitted 1925)
- 1137 (1874–1933, pannier tanks fitted 1914)
- 1138 (1874–1930, pannier tanks fitted 1919)
- 1139 (1874–1930, pannier tanks fitted 1913)
- 1140 (1874–1928, pannier tanks fitted 1911)
- 1141 (1874–1932, pannier tanks fitted 1922)
- 1142 (1874–1935, pannier tanks fitted 1911)
- 1143 (1874–1932, pannier tanks fitted 1914)
- 1144 (1875–1931, pannier tanks fitted 1914)
- 1145 (1875–1934, pannier tanks fitted 1920)
- 1146 (1875–1929, pannier tanks fitted 1920)
- 1147 (1875–1931, pannier tanks fitted 1923)
- 1148 (1875–1934, pannier tanks fitted 1922)
- 1149 (1875–1928, pannier tanks fitted 1920)
- 1150 (1875–1928)
- 1151 (1875–1932, pannier tanks fitted 1919)
- 1152 (1875–1935, pannier tanks fitted 1920)
- 1153 (1875–1932, pannier tanks fitted 1921)

=== 1166 to 1185 ===
- 1166 (1875–1934, pannier tanks fitted 1922)
- 1167 (1875–1936, pannier tanks fitted 1913)
- 1168 (1875–1928, pannier tanks fitted 1923)
- 1169 (1875–1934, pannier tanks fitted 1917)
- 1170 (1875–1927, pannier tanks fitted 1918)
- 1171 (1875–1934, pannier tanks fitted 1915)
- 1172 (1875–1930, pannier tanks fitted 1920)
- 1173 (1875–1928, pannier tanks fitted 1914)
- 1174 (1875–1934, pannier tanks fitted 1917)
- 1175 (1875–1933, pannier tanks fitted 1911)
- 1176 (1875–1931, pannier tanks fitted 1924)
- 1177 (1875–1929, pannier tanks fitted 1924)
- 1178 (1875–1930, pannier tanks fitted 1920)
- 1179 (1875–1935, pannier tanks fitted 1920)
- 1180 (1875–1934, pannier tanks fitted 1911)
- 1181 (1875–1935, pannier tanks fitted 1916)
- 1182 (1875–1929, pannier tanks fitted 1920)
- 1183 (1875–1930, pannier tanks fitted 1922)
- 1184 (1875–1903)
- 1185 (1875–1931, pannier tanks fitted 1919)

=== 1228 to 1297 ===
- 1228 (1876–1931, pannier tanks fitted 1916)
- 1229 (1876–1931, pannier tanks fitted 1917)
- 1230 (1876–1932, pannier tanks fitted 1914)
- 1231 (1876–1930, pannier tanks fitted 1928)
- 1232 (1876–1930, pannier tanks fitted 1923)
- 1233 (1876–1931, pannier tanks fitted 1922)
- 1234 (1876–1935, pannier tanks fitted 1928)
- 1235 (1876–1937, pannier tanks fitted 1924)
- 1236 (1876–1931, pannier tanks fitted 1923)
- 1237 (1876–1934, pannier tanks fitted 1915)
- 1238 (1876–1932, pannier tanks fitted 1926)
- 1239 (1876–1935, pannier tanks fitted 1927)
- 1240 (1877–1935, pannier tanks fitted 1917)
- 1241 (1877–1928, pannier tanks fitted 1921)
- 1242 (1877–1931, pannier tanks fitted 1913)
- 1243 (1877–1932, pannier tanks fitted 1913)
- 1244 (1877–1930, pannier tanks fitted 1920)
- 1245 (1877–1935, pannier tanks fitted 1927)
- 1246 (1877–1934, pannier tanks fitted 1924)
- 1247 (1877–1939, pannier tanks fitted 1914)
- 1248 (1877–1931, pannier tanks fitted 1916)
- 1249 (1877–1929, pannier tanks fitted 1920)
- 1250 (1877–1935, pannier tanks fitted 1925)
- 1251 (1877–1929, pannier tanks fitted 1925)
- 1252 (1877–1932, pannier tanks fitted 1911)
- 1253 (1877–1932, pannier tanks fitted 1913)
- 1254 (1877–1937, pannier tanks fitted 1916)
- 1255 (1877–1931, pannier tanks fitted 1928)
- 1256 (1877–1936, pannier tanks fitted 1921)
- 1257 (1877–1930, pannier tanks fitted 1919)
- 1258 (1877–1929, pannier tanks fitted 1925)
- 1259 (1877–1932, pannier tanks fitted 1920)
- 1260 (1877–1934, pannier tanks fitted 1921)
- 1261 (1877–1928, pannier tanks fitted 1921)
- 1262 (1877–1930, pannier tanks fitted 1915)
- 1263 (1877–1934, pannier tanks fitted 1920)
- 1264 (1877–1928, pannier tanks fitted 1923)
- 1265 (1877–1937, pannier tanks fitted 1922)
- 1266 (1877–1930, pannier tanks fitted 1916)
- 1267 (1877–1930, pannier tanks fitted 1925)
- 1268 (1877–1934, pannier tanks fitted 1914)
- 1269 (1877–1938, pannier tanks fitted 1921)
- 1270 (1877–1931, pannier tanks fitted 1919)
- 1271 (1877–1937, pannier tanks fitted 1921)
- 1272 (1877–1934, pannier tanks fitted 1920)
- 1273 (1877–1933, pannier tanks fitted 1923)
- 1274 (1877–1930, pannier tanks fitted 1916)
- 1275 (1877–1928, pannier tanks fitted 1916)
- 1276 (1877–1934, pannier tanks fitted 1925)
- 1277 (1877–1911)
- 1278 (1877–1936, pannier tanks fitted 1916)
- 1279 (1877–1935, pannier tanks fitted 1913)
- 1280 (1877–1929, pannier tanks fitted 1922)
- 1281 (1877–1935, pannier tanks fitted 1913)
- 1282 (1877–1936, pannier tanks fitted 1916)
- 1283 (1877–1929, pannier tanks fitted 1920)
- 1284 (1878–1936, pannier tanks fitted 1923)
- 1285 (1878–1934, pannier tanks fitted 1919)
- 1286 (1878–1930, pannier tanks fitted 1919)
- 1287 (1878–1946, pannier tanks fitted 1925)
- 1288 (1878–1930, pannier tanks fitted 1918)
- 1289 (1878–1934, pannier tanks fitted 1925)
- 1290 (1878–1932, pannier tanks fitted 1913)
- 1291 (1878–1929, pannier tanks fitted 1916)
- 1292 (1878–1934, pannier tanks fitted 1915)
- 1293 (1878–1928, pannier tanks fitted 1916)
- 1294 (1878–1931, pannier tanks fitted 1921)
- 1295 (1878–1930, pannier tanks fitted 1923)
- 1296 (1878–1936, pannier tanks fitted 1920)
- 1297 (1878–1932, pannier tanks fitted 1914)

=== 1561 to 1660 ===
- 1561 (1878–1934, pannier tanks fitted 1918)
- 1562 (1878–1938, pannier tanks fitted 1926)
- 1563 (1878–1931, pannier tanks fitted 1923)
- 1564 (1878–1931, pannier tanks fitted 1925)
- 1565 (1878–1938, pannier tanks fitted 1921)
- 1566 (1878–1935, pannier tanks fitted 1913)
- 1567 (1878–1936, pannier tanks fitted 1914)
- 1568 (1878–1938, pannier tanks fitted 1918)
- 1569 (1878–1932, pannier tanks fitted 1918)
- 1570 (1879–1935, pannier tanks fitted 1912)
- 1571 (1879–1931, pannier tanks fitted 1918)
- 1572 (1879–1933, pannier tanks fitted 1914)
- 1573 (1879–1935, pannier tanks fitted 1913)
- 1574 (1879–1937, pannier tanks fitted 1927)
- 1575 (1879–1930, pannier tanks fitted 1911)
- 1576 (1879–1928, pannier tanks fitted 1911)
- 1577 (1879–1934, pannier tanks fitted 1921)
- 1578 (1879–1933, pannier tanks fitted 1927)
- 1579 (1879–1930, pannier tanks fitted 1921)
- 1580 (1879–1935, pannier tanks fitted 1915)
- 1581 (1879–1929)
- 1582 (1879–1931, pannier tanks fitted 1922)
- 1583 (1879–1928, pannier tanks fitted 1919)
- 1584 (1879–1933, pannier tanks fitted 1912)
- 1585 (1879–1946, pannier tanks fitted 1919)
- 1586 (1879–1931, pannier tanks fitted 1918)
- 1587 (1879–1934, pannier tanks fitted 1914)
- 1588 (1879–1929, pannier tanks fitted 1917)
- 1589 (1879–1928, pannier tanks fitted 1922)
- 1590 (1879–1931, pannier tanks fitted 1918)
- 1591 (1879–1922)
- 1592 (1879–1928, pannier tanks fitted 1911)
- 1593 (1879–1934, pannier tanks fitted 1920)
- 1594 (1879–1930)
- 1595 (1879–1927, pannier tanks fitted 1911)
- 1596 (1879–1928, pannier tanks fitted 1917)
- 1597 (1879–1934, pannier tanks fitted 1916)
- 1598 (1879–1935, pannier tanks fitted 1916)
- 1599 (1879–1936, pannier tanks fitted 1923)
- 1600 (1879–1937, pannier tanks fitted 1924)
- 1601 (1879–1931, pannier tanks fitted 1915)
- 1602 (1879–1928, pannier tanks fitted 1914)
- 1603 (1879–1931, pannier tanks fitted 1926)
- 1604 (1879–1929, pannier tanks fitted 1916)
- 1605 (1879–1931, pannier tanks fitted 1914)
- 1606 (1879–1931, pannier tanks fitted 1911)
- 1607 (1880–1930, pannier tanks fitted 1919)
- 1608 (1880–1935, pannier tanks fitted 1917)
- 1609 (1880–1931, pannier tanks fitted 1916)
- 1610 (1880–1935, pannier tanks fitted 1927)
- 1611 (1880–1935, pannier tanks fitted 1915)
- 1612 (1880–1928)
- 1613 (1880–1929, pannier tanks fitted 1915)
- 1614 (1880–1928, pannier tanks fitted 1917)
- 1615 (1880–1939, pannier tanks fitted 1917)
- 1616 (1880–1929, pannier tanks fitted 1920)
- 1617 (1880–1934, pannier tanks fitted 1921)
- 1618 (1880–1929)
- 1619 (1880–1929, pannier tanks fitted 1915)
- 1620 (1880–1937, pannier tanks fitted 1917)
- 1621 (1880–1932, pannier tanks fitted 1911)
- 1622 (1880–1929, pannier tanks fitted 1915)
- 1623 (1880–1936, pannier tanks fitted 1913)
- 1624 (1880–1946, pannier tanks fitted 1925)
- 1625 (1880–1928, pannier tanks fitted 1917)
- 1626 (1880–1928, pannier tanks fitted 1912)
- 1627 (1880–1930, pannier tanks fitted 1913)
- 1628 (1880–1932, pannier tanks fitted 1914)
- 1629 (1880–1937, pannier tanks fitted 1924)
- 1630 (1880–1934, pannier tanks fitted 1921)
- 1631 (1880–1929, pannier tanks fitted 1913)
- 1632 (1880–1939, pannier tanks fitted 1913)
- 1633 (1880–1929, pannier tanks fitted 1920)
- 1634 (1880–1929, pannier tanks fitted 1915)
- 1635 (1880–1932, pannier tanks fitted 1911)
- 1636 (1880–1929, pannier tanks fitted 1914)
- 1637 (1880–1935, pannier tanks fitted 1913)
- 1638 (1880–1938, pannier tanks fitted 1917)
- 1639 (1880–1931, pannier tanks fitted 1914)
- 1640 (1880–1931, pannier tanks fitted 1917)
- 1641 (1880–1938, pannier tanks fitted 1913)
- 1642 (1880–1935, pannier tanks fitted 1921)
- 1643 (1880–1931, pannier tanks fitted 1914)
- 1644 (1880–1935, pannier tanks fitted 1923)
- 1645 (1880–1934, pannier tanks fitted 1927)
- 1646 (1880–1934, pannier tanks fitted 1918)
- 1647 (1881–1936, pannier tanks fitted 1914)
- 1648 (1881–1936, pannier tanks fitted 1913)
- 1649 (1881–1935, pannier tanks fitted 1920)
- 1650 (1881–1936, pannier tanks fitted 1926)
- 1651 (1881–1930, pannier tanks fitted 1911)
- 1652 (1881–1932, pannier tanks fitted 1923)
- 1653 (1881–1930, pannier tanks fitted 1920)
- 1654 (1881–1932, pannier tanks fitted 1925)
- 1655 (1881–1931, pannier tanks fitted 1913)
- 1656 (1881–1930, pannier tanks fitted 1914)
- 1657 (1881–1931, pannier tanks fitted 1927)
- 1658 (1881–1934, pannier tanks fitted 1914)
- 1659 (1881–1930, pannier tanks fitted 1916)
- 1660 (1881–1938, pannier tanks fitted 1914)
