= GWR 1901 Class =

Class of 120 small 0-6-0ST steam locomotives

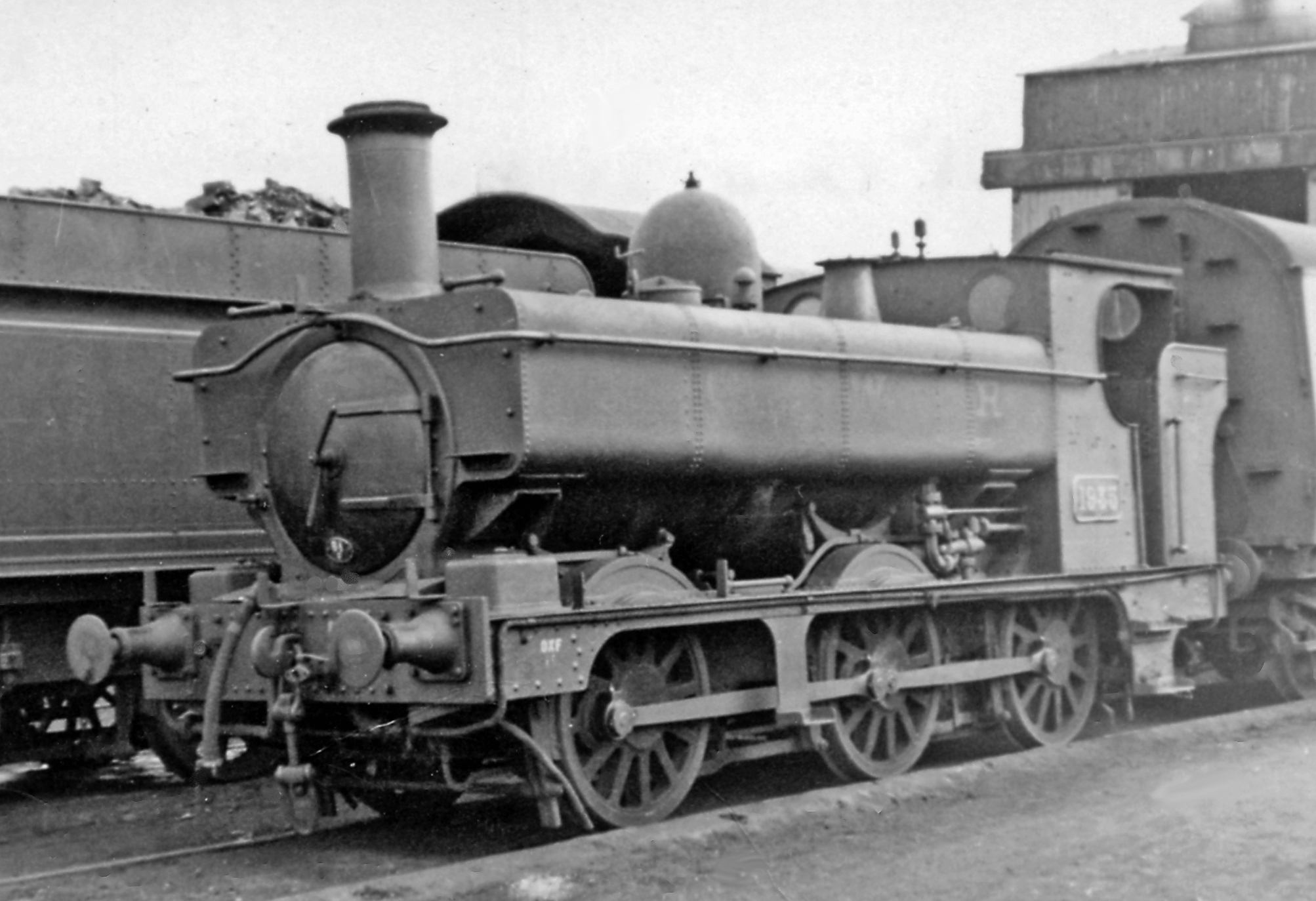
- No. 1935 at Oxford Locomotive Depot 22 February 1953
Type and origin
- Power type: Steam
- Designer: George Armstrong
- Builder: GWR Wolverhampton works
- Build date: 1881-1895
- Total produced: 120
Specifications
- Configuration
  - Whyte: 0-6-0ST
- Gauge: 4 ft 8 1/2 in (1,435 mm) standard gauge
- Driver dia.: 4 ft 0 in (1.219 m)
- Wheelbase: 13 ft 8 in (4.17 m)
- Fuel type: Coal
- Cylinders: two
Career
- Operators: GWR
- Retired: 1942-1952
- Disposition: All scrapped

The GWR 1901 Class was a class of 120 small 0-6-0ST steam locomotives. Numbered 1901–2020, they were designed by George Armstrong (responsible to William Dean at Swindon) and built at the Wolverhampton railway works, England, of the Great Western Railway between 1881 and 1895. They had wheels of 4 ft 0 in (1.219 m) diameter and a coupled wheelbase of 13 ft 8 in (4.17 m).

== Construction ==
- Nos. 1901-1912 (Lot J2, 1881–82)
- Nos. 1913-1924 (Lot L2, 1882)
- Nos. 1925-1936 (Lot O2, 1883–4)
- Nos. 1937-1948 (Lot Q2, 1886–7)
- Nos. 1949-1960 (Lot R2, 1888)
- Nos. 1961-1972 (Lot T2, 1889–90)
- Nos. 1973-1984 (Lot V2, 1890–91)
- Nos. 1985-1996 (Lot X2, 1891)
- Nos. 1997-2008 (Lot Y2, 1891–92)
- Nos. 2009-2020 (Lot Z2, 1894–5)

== Rebuilding ==
The class was considered to be part of the very similar 850 Class after the latter was reboilered in the 1890s. The whole series was later rebuilt again as pannier tanks.

== British Railways ==
Forty-four locomotives survived into British Railways (BR) ownership in 1948. Their BR numbers were 992 and 1903-2019 (with gaps). BR called them 1901 class, including no. 992 which was from the 850 class. Only three GWR saddle tank locomotives survived into nationalisation. Of these two were from the 1901 class, Nos. 1925 and 2007, which were withdrawn in 1951 and 1949. The other was GWR 2021 Class No. 2048 which was rebuilt as a pannier tank locomotive shortly after nationalisation and scrapped in 1952.

== See also ==
- GWR 0-6-0PT – list of classes of GWR 0-6-0PT, including table of preserved locomotives
