= GWR 1016 Class =

Class of British steam locomotives

Type and origin
- Power type: Steam
- Designer: George Armstrong
- Builder: Wolverhampton, GWR
- Order number: Lots: B, C, J, K, L
- Serial number: Works Nos: 47–70, 131–66
- Build date: 1867–71
- Total produced: 60
Specifications
- Configuration
  - Whyte: 0-6-0ST
- Gauge: 4 ft 8 1/2 in (1,435 mm) standard gauge
- Driver dia.: 4 ft 6 in (1.372 m)
- Wheelbase: 7 ft 4 in (2.24 m) + 8 ft 2 in (2.49 m), total 15 ft 6 in (4.72 m)
- Frame type: Type: Double; Length: 26 ft 8 1/2 in (8.14 m)
- Axle load: 13 long tons 0 cwt (29,100 lb or 13.2 t) full
- Loco weight: 37 long tons 0 cwt (82,900 lb or 37.6 t) full
- Fuel type: Coal
- Water cap.: 880 imp gal (4,000 L; 1,060 US gal)
- Firebox
  - Grate area: 16.25 sq ft (1.510 m^{2})
- Boiler: Barrel: 11 ft 0 in (3.35 m); Outside diameter: 4 ft 7 7/8 in (1.419 m)
- Boiler pressure: 140 lbf/in^{2} (0.97 MPa)
- Heating surface
  - Firebox: 91.75 sq ft (8.524 m^{2})
  - Tubes: 1,045.25 sq ft (97.107 m^{2})
  - Total surface: 1,137.0 sq ft (105.63 m^{2})
- Cylinders: Two, inside
- Cylinder size: Diameter: 16 in (406 mm); Stroke: 24 in (610 mm)
- Loco brake: Wooden blocks (Note: GWR ended the use of wooden blocks in the 1870s when cast iron blocks with steam brakes were introduced.)
Performance figures
- Tractive effort: 13,540 lbf (60.23 kN)
Career
- Operators: GWR
- Class: GWR 1016
- Numbers: 1016–75
- Locale: GWR Northern and Southern divisions
- Withdrawn: 1910–35
- Disposition: All scrapped

The 1016 Class consisted of sixty double framed 0-6-0ST locomotives designed by George Armstrong and built at the Wolverhampton Works of the Great Western Railway between 1867 and 1871. Like the earlier 302 Class of Joseph Armstrong, the 1016s had 4 ft 6 in (1.372 m) wheels and a 15 ft 6 in (4.72 m) wheelbase, dimensions that would remain traditional for the larger GWR pannier tanks right through to Charles Collett's 5700 Class, and with little change to Frederick Hawksworth's 9400 Class of 1947.

== Construction ==
The 1016 Class consisted of 60 engines and was built in five lots:

- Nos. 1016–1027 (Lot B, 1867)
- Nos. 1028–1039 (Lot C, 1867-8)
- Nos. 1040–1051 (Lot J, 1870)
- Nos. 1052–1063 (Lot K, 1870-1)
- Nos. 1064–1075 (Lot L, 1871)

== Design and modifications ==
The class originally had very short saddle tanks. They were a Wolverhampton version of the Standard Goods class, which they resembled below the running plate. Between 1879 and 1895 the 16 in × 24 in (406 mm × 610 mm) cylinders were mostly enlarged to 17 in (432 mm), and the wheels enlarged to 4 ft 7 7/8 in (1.419 m) by means of thicker tyres. Most reboilering was done at Swindon rather than Wolverhampton, and with new boilers new, full-length tanks were fitted. From 1911 all but 11 of the class were rebuilt with pannier tanks, at the time that Belpaire fireboxes were fitted. After 1922 heavier boilers were used, and pressure increased. Many had new bunkers, of both Swindon and Wolverhampton design.

== Use ==
These engines were distributed between the Northern and Southern Divisions of the GWR. Apart from four scrapped before 1914 all ran well over a million miles; No. 1047, aged 65, was the last survivor, in summer 1935.
