= GWR 850 Class =

Class of British steam locomotives

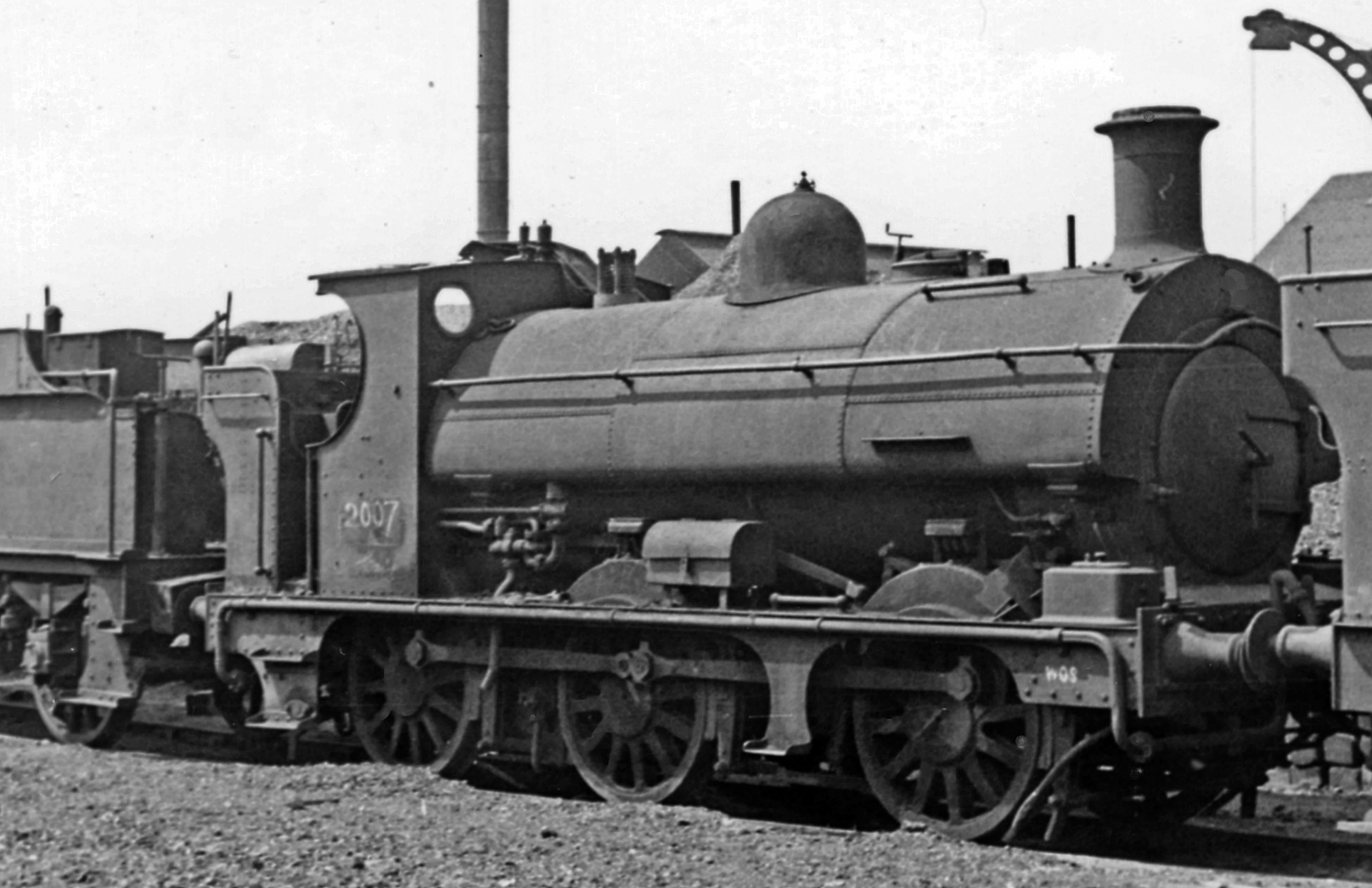
- No. 2007 (withdrawn 12/49) awaiting scrapping at Swindon 1950
Type and origin
- Power type: Steam
- Designer: George Armstrong
- Builder: GWR Wolverhampton works
- Build date: 1874-1895
- Total produced: 170
Specifications
- Configuration
  - Whyte: 0-6-0ST
- Gauge: 4 ft 8 1/2 in (1,435 mm) standard gauge
- Driver dia.: 4 ft 0 in (1.219 m)
- Wheelbase: 13 ft 8 in (4.17 m)
  - Axle spacing (Asymmetrical): 7 ft 4 in + 6 ft 4 in (2,235.2 + 1,930.4 mm)
- Fuel type: Coal
- Boiler: GWR 850
- Cylinders: two
- Cylinder size: 15 in × 24 in (381 mm × 610 mm)
Career
- Operators: Great Western Railway; British Railways
- Retired: 1927–1958
- Disposition: All scrapped

The GWR Class 850 was an extensive class of small 0-6-0ST locomotives designed by George Armstrong and built at the Wolverhampton railway works of the Great Western Railway between 1874 and 1895. Aptly described as the GWR equivalent of the LB&SCR "Terrier" Class of William Stroudley, their wide availability and lively performance gave them long lives, and eventually they were replaced from 1949 by what were in essence very similar locomotives, the short-lived 1600 Class of Frederick Hawksworth, which in the headlong abandonment of steam outlived them by a mere seven years or so.

== Construction ==
The 850 Class originally consisted of 50 locomotives comprising 48 new and two rebuilds. The rebuilds, Nos. 93 and 94, were supplied in 1875 and 1877 as renewals of the original Gooch locomotives of 1860. Later, as locomotives were rebuilt, the 120 locomotives of the 1901 class were incorporated into the 850 class to make a total of 170 locomotives. It has been claimed that Nos. 1216–1227 were part of the 1901 class but this seems unlikely because they were built before the 1901 class was introduced.

850 class
GWR nos.	Lot	Date built	Class	No. built	Notes
850–861	T	1874	850	12	
862–873	V	1874–75	850	12	
987–998	X	1875–76	850	12	
93–94	–	1875–77	850	2	Rebuilds
1216–1227	Y	1876–77	850	12	
Total				50	

1901 class
GWR nos.	Lot	Date built	Class	No. built	Notes
1901–1912	J2	1881–82	1901	12	
1913–1924	L2	1882	1901	12	
1925–1936	O2	1883–84	1901	12	
1937–1948	Q2	1886–87	1901	12	
1949–1960	R2	1888	1901	12	
1961–1972	T2	1889–90	1901	12	
1973–1984	V2	1890–91	1901	12	
1985–1996	X2	1891	1901	12	
1997–2008	Y2	1891–92	1901	12	
2009–2020	Z2	1894–95	1901	12	
Total				120	

== Modifications ==
No. 867 of the 850 class as running in 1896

The original 36 locomotives had their domes on the firebox, while the domes of the rest were on the middle of the boiler. The two classes became more uniform on rebuilding. All had full-length saddle-tanks; the wheels were 4 ft 0 in (1.219 m) diameter, the wheelbase was 13 ft 8 in (4.17 m), and cylinders 15 in × 24 in (381 mm × 610 mm). They had inside frames. Pannier tanks were fitted from 1910, as rebuilding with Belpaire boilers took place, and from 1924 larger coal bunkers were fitted to many of the class. Seventeen locomotives retained their saddle tanks to the end. These were Nos. 855, 864, 873, 990, 991, 1216, 1904, 1913, 1925, 1932, 1933, 1939, 1944, 1963, 1981, 1984, & 2007.

== Use ==
The engines were widely spread over the GWR network. They were useful for shunting in dock areas, as at Plymouth, Bristol, Llanelly, and Birkenhead, which was their last stronghold; in 1881-2 four went new to the Cornwall Minerals Railway. In 1906 and 1913 four were sold into industrial service, followed by four more in 1939. Up to 1927 the class were used on empty stock work at Paddington.

== Crane tanks ==
In 1901 two 0-6-4PT crane engines were built at Swindon for use around the works. They consisted of a class 850 engine with the frames extended backwards to hold a steam crane supported by a 4-wheel trailing bogie. They were Nos. 17 Cyclops and 18 Steropes. A third, No. 16 Hercules, followed in 1921. All three were scrapped in 1936.

The first two crane engines had a boiler pressure of 150 lbf/in^{2} (1.03 MPa); the third used 165 lbf/in^{2} (1.14 MPa). Hercules' crane could lift 6 long tons (6.7 short tons) at 18 ft (5.49 m) radius (double chain), or 9 long tons (10.1 short tons) at 12 ft (3.66 m) radius (triple chain). Total engine weight was 63 long tons 12 cwt (71.2 short tons).

== British Railways ==
One 850 class (no. 992) and forty-three former 1901 class locomotives passed into British Railways (BR) ownership in 1948 and were given the power classification "2F". According to Ian Allan, BR called them 1901 class (including No. 992). Ten were painted in BR unlined black, and the last examples survived as late as 1958, the last Armstrong engines in service.

Only three unconverted saddle tanks survived into nationalisation. Of these, two were from the 850 class, Nos. 1925 and 2007, which were withdrawn in 1951 and 1949. The other was GWR 2021 Class No. 2048, which was rebuilt as a pannier tank locomotive shortly after nationalisation and scrapped in 1952. Locomotive No. 1925 featured in the 1949 movie The Chiltern Hundreds when it is seen arriving with a train at Denham station.

Ian Allan gives the following details for the 1901 class in 1948:

BR numbers, 992 and 1903-2019 (with gaps)
Total, 44 locomotives
Weight, 36.15 long tons (36.73 t; 40.49 short tons) (full)
Boiler pressure, 165 psi (1,140 kPa)
Cylinders, 16 in × 24 in (410 mm × 610 mm)
Driving wheels, 4 ft 1.5 in (1,257 mm)
Tractive effort, 17,410 lbf (77.4 kN)
Route availability, unclassed
