= GWR 655 Class =

Class of British steam locomotives

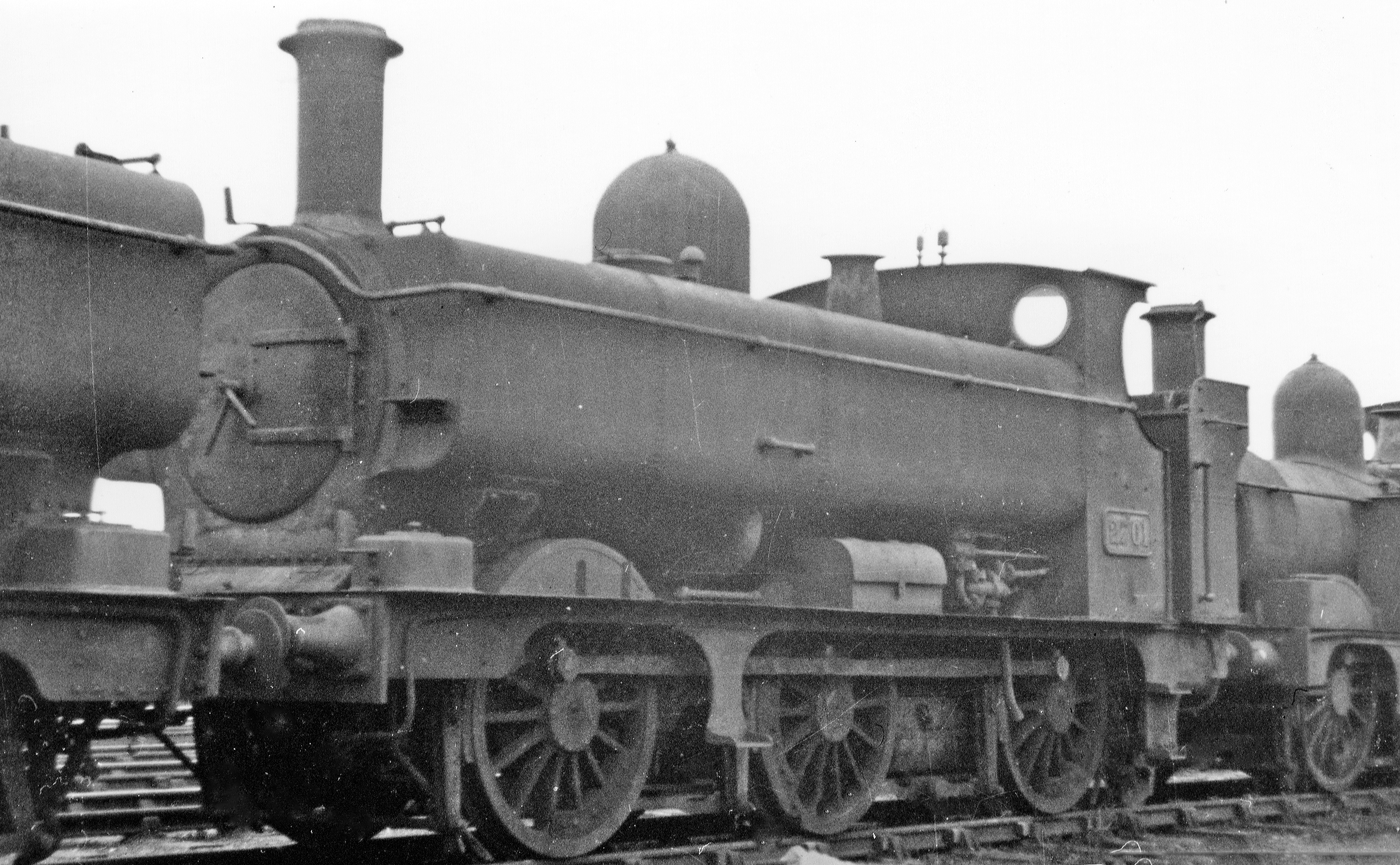
- 2701 outside Swindon Works, 1947
Type and origin
- Power type: Steam
- Designer: George Armstrong
- Builder: Wolverhampton, GWR
- Order number: Lots: A3, B3, E3
- Serial number: Works Nos: 563–74, 575–94, 605–24
- Build date: 1892–97
- Total produced: 52
Specifications
- Configuration
  - Whyte: 0-6-0ST
- Gauge: 4 ft 8 1/2 in (1,435 mm) standard gauge
- Driver dia.: 4 ft 6 in (1.372 m)
- Wheelbase: 7 ft 3 in (2.21 m) + 8 ft 4 in (2.54 m), total 15 ft 6 in (4.72 m)
- Frame type: Type: Inside; Length: 26 ft 6 in (8.08 m)
- Axle load: (1741) 13 long tons 18 cwt (31,100 lb or 14.1 t) 14.1 t; 15.6 short tons full; (2701) 14 long tons 6 cwt (32,000 lb or 14.5 t) 14.5 t; 16.0 short tons full
- Loco weight: (1741) 41 long tons 4 cwt (92,300 lb or 41.9 t) 41.9 t; 46.1 short tons full; (2701) 42 long tons 5 cwt (94,600 lb or 42.9 t) 42.9 t; 47.3 short tons full
- Fuel type: Coal
- Water cap.: 1,000 imp gal (4,500 L; 1,200 US gal)
- Firebox
  - Grate area: 15.16 sq ft (1.408 m^{2})
- Boiler: Barrel: 10 ft 6 in (3.20 m); Outside diameter: 4 ft 2 in (1.270 m); Pitch: 6 ft 4 3/4 in (1.949 m)
- Boiler pressure: 140 lbf/in^{2} (0.97 MPa)
- Heating surface
  - Firebox: 103 sq ft (9.6 m^{2})
  - Tubes: 1,125 sq ft (104.5 m^{2})
  - Total surface: 1,228 sq ft (114.1 m^{2})
- Cylinders: Two, inside
- Cylinder size: Diameter: 17 in (432 mm); Stroke: 24 in (610 mm)
- Loco brake: Steam (Note: Steam brakes with cast iron blocks became standard in the 1870s.)
Performance figures
- Tractive effort: 15,285 lbf (67.99 kN)
Career
- Operators: GWR
- Class: GWR 655
- Numbers: 655, 767, 1741–50, 1771–90, 2701–20
- Locale: Primarily GWR Northern division
- Withdrawn: 1928–50
- Disposition: All Scrapped

Class 655 of the Great Western Railway was a class of 52 0-6-0ST locomotives designed by George Armstrong and built at the GWR's Wolverhampton Works.

== Design and construction ==
They were built in three lots between 1892 and 1897:

- Nos. 655, 767 and 1741-1750 (Lot A3, 1892)
- Nos. 1771-1790 (Lot B3, 1892-4)
- Nos. 2701-2720 (Lot E3, 1896-7)

They were in effect a continuation of the 645 Class, with longer frames though using the same 4 ft 6 in (1,370 mm) wheels and 15 ft 6 in (4.72 m) wheelbase, and they were the last of the larger type of tank engine to be built at Wolverhampton. Pannier tanks were later fitted to all of them, apart from No. 1772, between 1912 and 1930.

== Use ==
They were nearly all Northern Division engines until the 1920s, though later Weymouth had as many as five. Withdrawal started in 1928, but 21 continued into British Railways ownership. Nos. 1782 and 2719 survived until November 1950.

== Sources ==
- le Fleming, H. M. (April 1958). White, D. E. (ed.). The Locomotives of the Great Western Railway, part five: Six-coupled Tank Engines. RCTS. ISBN 0-901115-35-5. OCLC 500544510.
