= GWR 1600 Class =

British steam locomotive class (1949–1966)

GWR 1600 class
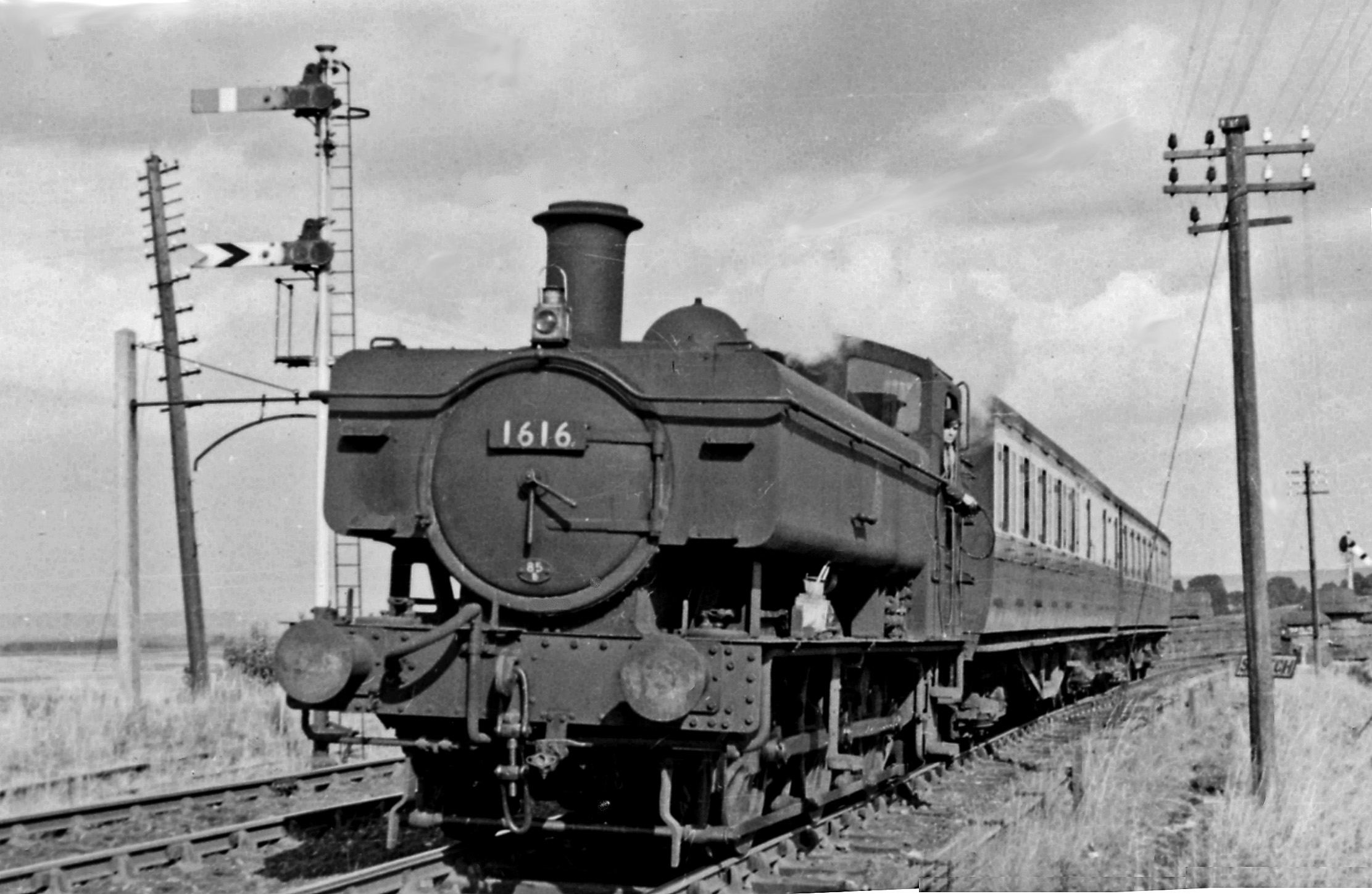
- 1616 at Severn Bridge station in 1951
Type and origin
- Power type: Steam
- Designer: Frederick Hawksworth
- Builder: Swindon Works
- Order number: Lots 381, 389, 417
- Build date: 1949–1955
- Total produced: 70
Specifications
- Configuration
  - Whyte: 0-6-0PT
  - UIC: C n2t
- Gauge: 4 ft 8 1/2 in (1,435 mm) standard gauge
- Driver dia.: 4 ft 1 1/2 in (1.257 m)
- Minimum curve: 4 chains (264 ft; 80 m) normal, 3.5 chains (231 ft; 70 m) slow
- Wheelbase: 14 ft 8 in (4.47 m)
- Length: 30 ft 2 1/2 in (9.21 m) over buffers
- Width: 8 ft 7 in (2.616 m)
- Height: 11 ft 5 5/8 in (3.496 m)
- Axle load: 13 long tons 18 cwt (31,100 lb or 14.1 t) (14.1 t; 15.6 short tons) full
- Loco weight: 41 long tons 12 cwt (93,200 lb or 42.3 t) (42.3 t; 46.6 short tons) full
- Fuel type: Coal
- Water cap.: 875 imp gal (3,980 L; 1,051 US gal)
- Firebox
  - Grate area: 14.9 sq ft (1.38 m^{2})
- Boiler: GWR Standard No. 16
- Boiler pressure: 165 lbf/in^{2} (1.14 MPa)
- Heating surface
  - Firebox: 79.5 sq ft (7.39 m^{2})
  - Tubes: 877.2 sq ft (81.49 m^{2})
- Superheater: None
- Cylinders: Two, inside
- Cylinder size: 16.5 in × 24 in (419 mm × 610 mm)
- Valve gear: Stephenson
- Valve type: Slide valves
Performance figures
- Tractive effort: 18,515 lbf (82.36 kN)
Career
- Operators: British Railways, National Coal Board
- Power class: GWR: A BR: 2F
- Numbers: 1600–1669
- Axle load class: GWR: unclassed
- Withdrawn: 1959–1966
- Disposition: One preserved, remainder scrapped

The Great Western Railway (GWR) 1600 Class is a class of 0-6-0PT type steam locomotive designed for light branch lines, short-distance freight transfers and shunting duties.

== History ==
The class was based on the 2021 class designed by Dean and built from 1897 onwards. The 2021 class was in its turn an enlargement of the 850 class designed by Armstrong in 1874.

== Construction and operations ==
The 1600 Class was a pure GWR design but all 70 were built by the Western Region of British Railways. When the last member of the class was built in 1955, the basic design was over 80 years old; No. 1669 was the last one built, and in turn was the last GWR-design locomotive constructed at Swindon Works. BR gave the 1600 class the power classification 2F. Two locomotives (1646 and 1649) were transferred to the Scottish Region in 1957 and 1958 to operate the Dornoch Light Railway. The class's service life was short; withdrawals started in 1959 and all were gone by 1966, with 1659 having the shortest service (built 1955, withdrawn 1960). Two were sold for further use to the National Coal Board: 1600 in 1959 (scrapped 1963), and 1607 in 1965 (scrapped 1970). The last three in BR service were Nos. 1628, 1638 and 1660, all withdrawn from Croes Newydd shed.

Table of orders and numbers
Year	Quantity	Lot No.	Locomotive numbers	Notes
1949–50	30	381	1600–1629	
1951	20	389	1630–1649	
1954–55	20	417	1650–1669	

== Preservation ==
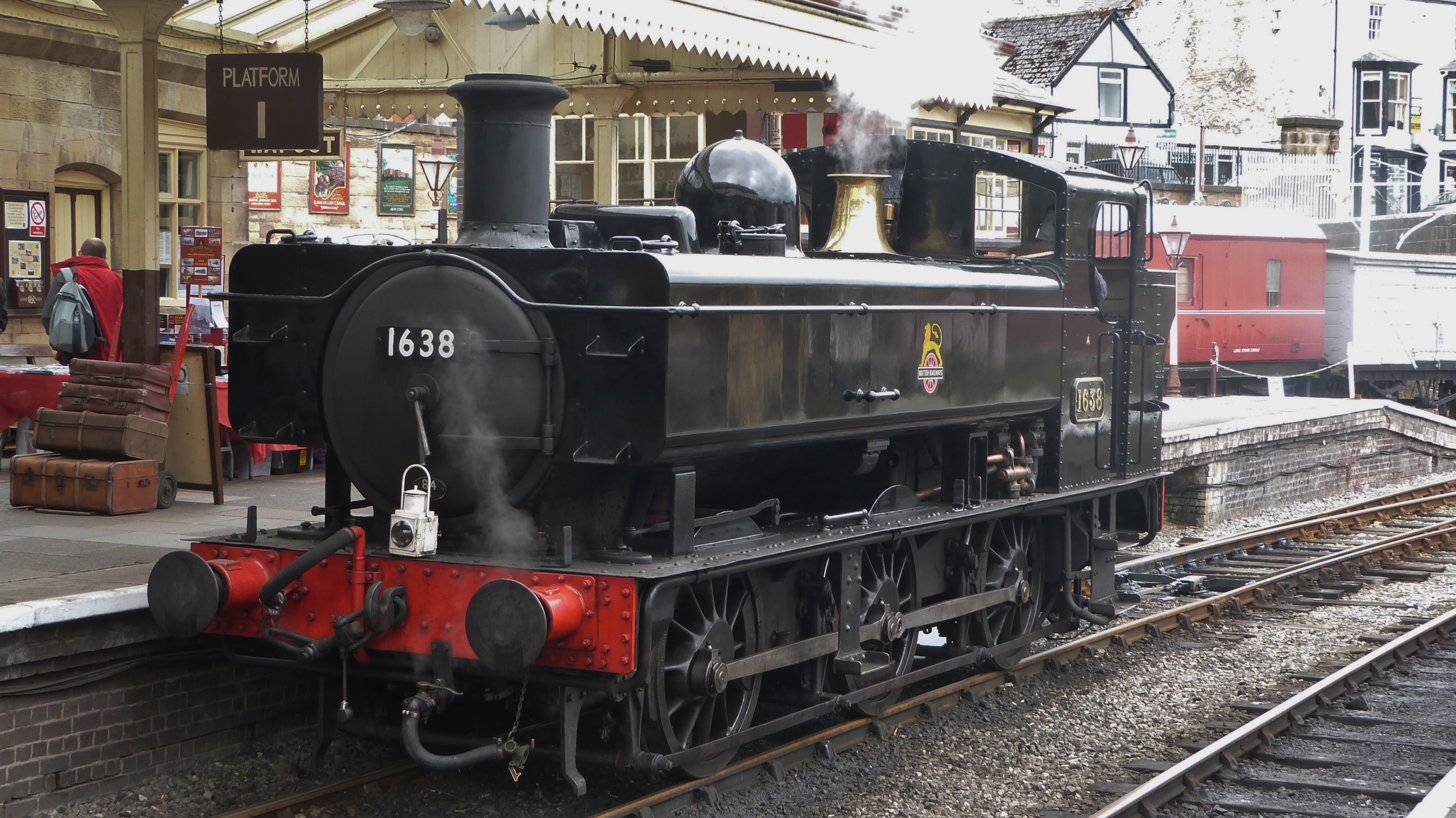
GWR 1600 No. 1638 at Llangollen Station on the Llangollen Railway

No. 1638 was the only member of the class to have been preserved. It was purchased in 1966 from BR for the Dart Valley Railway. In 1992 it was sold to its present home on the Kent and East Sussex Railway, and is currently operational after its latest overhaul was completed in 2016.

== See also ==
- GWR 0-6-0PT – list of classes of GWR 0-6-0 pannier tank, including table of preserved locomotives
