= GWR 645 and 1501 Classes =

Classes of British steam locomotives

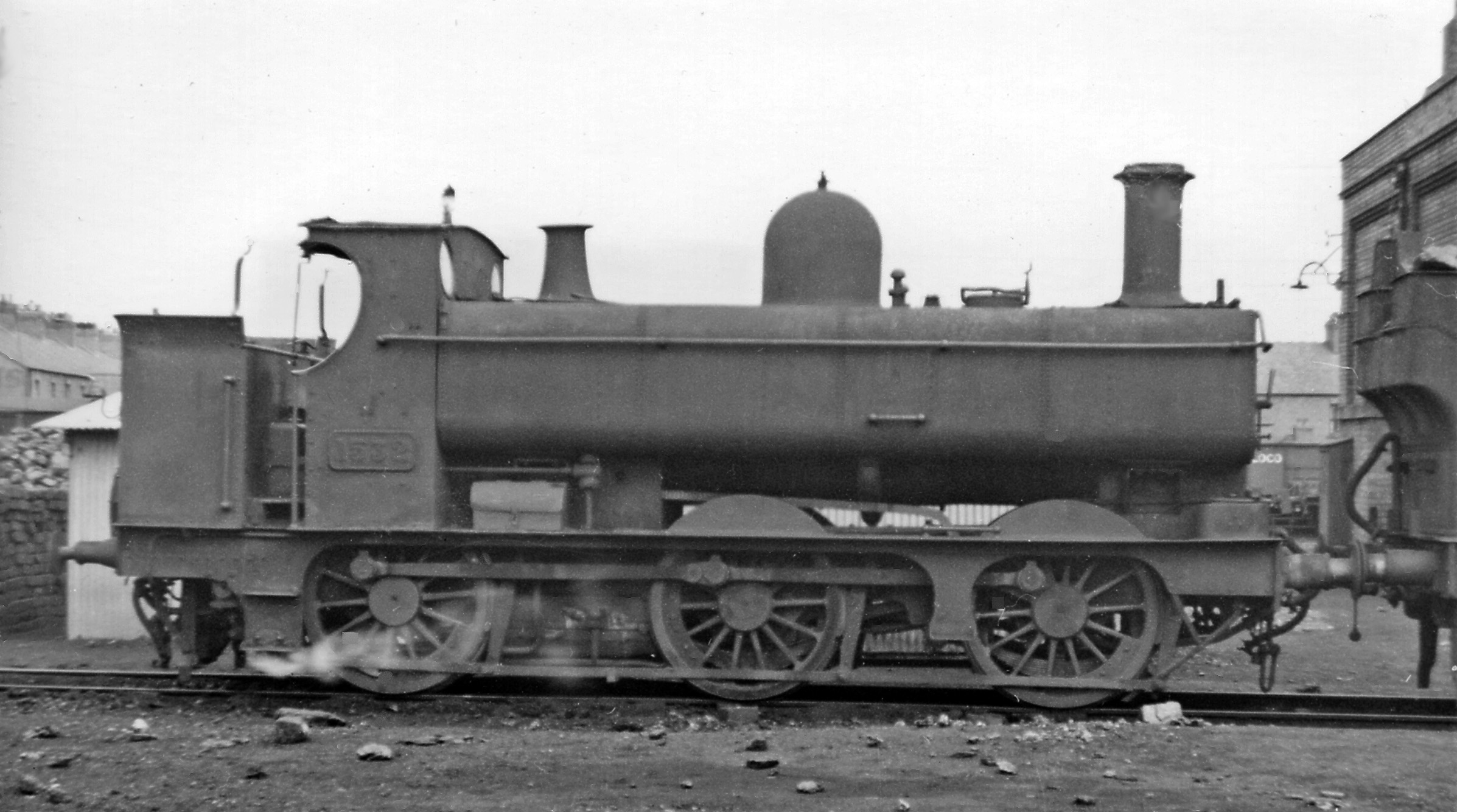
- No. 1532 at Croes Newydd Depot, 1947. This was built as a standard saddle-tank in 1879, and acquired its panniers in 1921
Type and origin
- Power type: Steam
- Designer: George Armstrong
- Builder: GWR Wolverhampton Works
- Build date: 1872-1881
- Total produced: 108
Specifications
- Configuration
  - Whyte: 0-6-0ST
- Gauge: 4 ft 8 1/2 in (1,435 mm) standard gauge
- Driver dia.: 4 ft 6 in (1.372 m) see text for variations
- Fuel type: Coal
- Cylinders: two
- Cylinder size: 16 in × 24 in (406 mm × 610 mm) see text for variations
Career
- Operators: South Wales Mineral Railway; Carmarthen and Cardigan Railway; Great Western Railway; British Railways
- Retired: 1928-1949
- Disposition: All scrapped

The GWR 645 and 1501 Classes were two closely related classes of 0-6-0ST designed by George Armstrong and built at the Wolverhampton railway works of the Great Western Railway (GWR). Thirty-six, the 645 Class, were constructed between 1872-3, of which three were built for the South Wales Mineral Railway (SWMR), two for the Carmarthen and Cardigan Railway (C&CR) and the remainder for the GWR. In essence, they were saddle tank versions of his GWR 633 Class of 1871. From 1878, a further 72, the 1501 Class, partially enlarged, were added. Unlike the originals, these had full-length saddle tanks from the start.

== Construction ==
The whole class was delivered in nine lots, as follows:

- 645-655, plus one (Lot O, 1872)
- 656, 757-763, plus four (Lot P, 1872-3)
- 764-775 (Lot Q, 1873)
- 1501-1512 (Lot A2, 1878)
- 1513-1524 (Lot B2, 1878-9)
- 1525-1536 (Lot D2, 1879)
- 1537-1548 (Lot E2, 1879–80)
- 1549-60 (Lot F2, 1880)
- 1801-1812 (Lot G2, 1881)

Three of the un-numbered engines plus No. 767 were sold to the SWMR, and the other two plus No. 655 to the C&CR. The latter three returned to the GWR in 1881, becoming Nos. 902-904.

== Dimensions ==
When built, they had 4 ft 6 in (1.372 m) driving wheels (later 4 ft 7 1/2 in or 1.410 m due to thicker tyres). The principal visual differences between the two classes were that the 645 class had short tanks and no cabs, whereas the 1501 class had cabs and full-length tanks. Other differences included:

645 Class: saddle tanks only cover the boiler and firebox; cab has only a front weatherboard and low side sheets; rear end of frames 5 ft 3 in (1.60 m) from rear axle; cylinder bore 16 in (410 mm); heating surface 1,300 sq ft (120.8 m^{2}); tank capacity 980 imp gal (4,500 L). Half-cabs were added a few years after construction.

1501 Class: saddle tanks are full-length, and cover the smokebox; cab has roof and full-height side sheets; rear end of frames 5 ft 9 in (1.75 m) from rear axle; cylinder bore 17 in (430 mm); heating surface 1,145 sq ft (106.4 m^{2}); tank capacity 1,120 imp gal (5,100 L).

From 1918 all but eight of the class were rebuilt with Belpaire fireboxes and larger, pannier tanks extending over the smokebox, and the 17 in (432 mm) diameter cylinders became standard.

== Use ==
Most of the 645s and 1501s were allocated to the Northern Division of the GWR. Between 1910 and 1922 three more of them, Nos. 1806, 1811 and 1546, were transferred to the SWMR, and others too went to South Wales. Most were withdrawn in 1930s. Nos. 1531, 1532, 1538 and 1542 passed briefly into British Railways ownership, but all were withdrawn by December 1949. None have survived into preservation.

== See also ==
- Locomotives of the Great Western Railway
- GWR 0-6-0PT
