= GWR Cathedral Class =

Proposed, never-built locomotive

1946 GWR 4-6-2 proposal
Type and origin
- Power type: Steam
- Designer: Frederick Hawksworth or F.C. Mattingley
- Build date: Never built
Specifications
- Configuration
  - Whyte: 4-6-2
  - UIC: 2′C1′ h4
- Driver dia.: 6 ft 6 in (1.981 m)
- Boiler pressure: 250 psi (1.7 MPa)
- Cylinders: Four (two outside, two inside)
- Cylinder size: 16 1/4 in × 28 in (410 mm × 710 mm)
Performance figures
- Tractive effort: 40,300 lbf (179.26 kN)

The Great Western Railway (GWR) never constructed a locomotive class with a number series from 8000 or named after Cathedrals. The name and or number series have been attached, most often by enthusiasts, to one genuine class, one abandoned GWR proposal and a number of fictional creations. The first recorded mention of naming locomotives after Cathedrals is associated with the development of the King class. The abandoned proposal was for a class of 4-6-2 steam locomotives. Some writers claim this was initiated by the last GWR Chief Mechanical Engineer, Frederick Hawksworth at various dates in the 1940s. Other sources state that this was never any more than a speculative study by the GWR Chief Draughtsman, Mattingley, and had no connection to Hawksworth, who cancelled the study when he heard about it. Neither the name "Cathedral" nor the number series 80xx appear to have been attached to the Mattingley study.

== GWR Proposals ==
=== King Class ===
The first mention of 'Cathedral' as a potential name for a GWR class came during Collett's development of the 'Super-Castle' class in late 1926 or early 1927. According to the writer OS Nock, it was known in Swindon, and even published in the local newspapers, that the new class would be 'Cathedrals', but this rumour probably originated in a humorous article in the local newspaper at the time. In the event, with the GWR invited to send a locomotive to the Baltimore and Ohio Railroad Centenary celebrations, Felix Pole realised that a 'Cathedral' would not impress the Americans, and gained the agreement of King George V that the first locomotive of the class would be named after him, and the rest after previous monarchs. Thus the King Class naming was adopted.

=== Proposed Pacific Class, 1940s ===
There was a proposal for a 4-6-2 locomotive from the Swindon drawing office in the mid 1940s. Different sources, even the same source at different dates, differ on when and who originated this. Griffiths claims that Hawksworth was "Consumed by one abiding passion, the production of a Pacific", and that he initiated a project for one when he became Chief Mechanical Engineer in 1941. This is not borne out, indeed it is flatly contradicted, by other sources. According to Griffiths this project was vetoed by government control of the railways. Griffiths goes on to say that Hawksworth revived this project at the end of hostilities. Various sources agree that a design study for a 4-6-2 was commenced about that time, but others, notably Summers, claim that this study was initiated by F. C. Mattingley, the chief draughtsman, without Hawksworth's involvement. All these writers claim to be relying on conversations with various drawing office staff, and none of them mention anything formally recorded in official documents.

==== The 1940s Design ====
All that survives in the GWR archives at the NRM is a packet of calculations signed by H. Tichener. This proposes a wide firebox boiler. However there is also in existence a diagram created by Mr. L. Ward of the RCTS, which is stated to be based on GWR drawings. The GWR drawings no longer exist. One cannot know how many of the features of the drawing are original, and how many interpretations by Mr Ward, but it is published widely, notably in the RCTS series. It shows a locomotive which appears to have a chassis developed from the King Class 4-6-0s, with the same cylinder and wheel dimensions and the same 250 psi (1.7 MPa) boiler pressure. The boiler is rather different from GWR conventions though, most notably featuring a steam dome.

==== Cancellation ====
It seems certain that this proposal never got as far as being presented to GWR directors. There are stories that Hawksworth destroyed the original GWR drawings with his own hands in the early 1960s and that he stated the GWR had no need for such a locomotive. Nock tells us that after initiating work on the project with his team Mattingley had it abruptly halted, but there is only speculation as to the reasons.

== Fictional Cathedral Class Locomotives ==
- The Cathedral name and the 80xx number do not appear to have been connected to the 1940s pacific proposal.
- The number series from 8000 is the next logical sequence for a GWR express locomotive and has been used for speculative articles and models of various wheel arrangements. The first may have been a 1942 article in the Model Railway News which describes a 2-8-2. Other examples include "The Great Western’s Last Pipe Dream?" and "8000 Gloucester Cathedral"
- Caledonia Works made a model of a Cathedral Class for Train Simulator 2022, with the commissioners of the project writing their own fictional history for the class.

== Bibliography ==
- Griffiths, Denis (1987). Locomotive engineers of the GWR. Wellingborough: Stephens. pp. 46–48. ISBN 0-85059-819-2.
- Jackson, Allen (2018). Great Western Railway Stars, Castles and Kings. Crowood Press. ISBN 978-1-78500-482-7.
- Nock, O. S. (1972). Engine 6000: the saga of a locomotive. Newton Abbot: David & Charles. ISBN 0-7153-5716-6.
- Nock, Oswald Stevens (1984). Tales of the Great Western Railway - Informal Recollections of a Near-lifetime's Association with the Line. David & Charles. ISBN 978-0-7153-8347-6.
- Nock, O.S. (1980). The GWR Stars, Castles & Kings (New Omnibus Edition combining parts 1 and 2 ed.). Newton Abbot: David and Charles. pp. 186, 187, 189. ISBN 0-7153-7977-1.
- le Fleming, H. M. (February 1962). White, D. E. (ed.). The Locomotives of the Great Western Railway, part nine: Standard Two-Cylinder Classes. RCTS. ISBN 0-901115-37-1. OCLC 655827210.
- Summers, L. A. (2013). Swindon Steam - a new light on GWR Loco Development. Amberley. ISBN 978 1 4456 1681 0.
