= GWR 2021 Class =

Class of 140 British steam locomotives

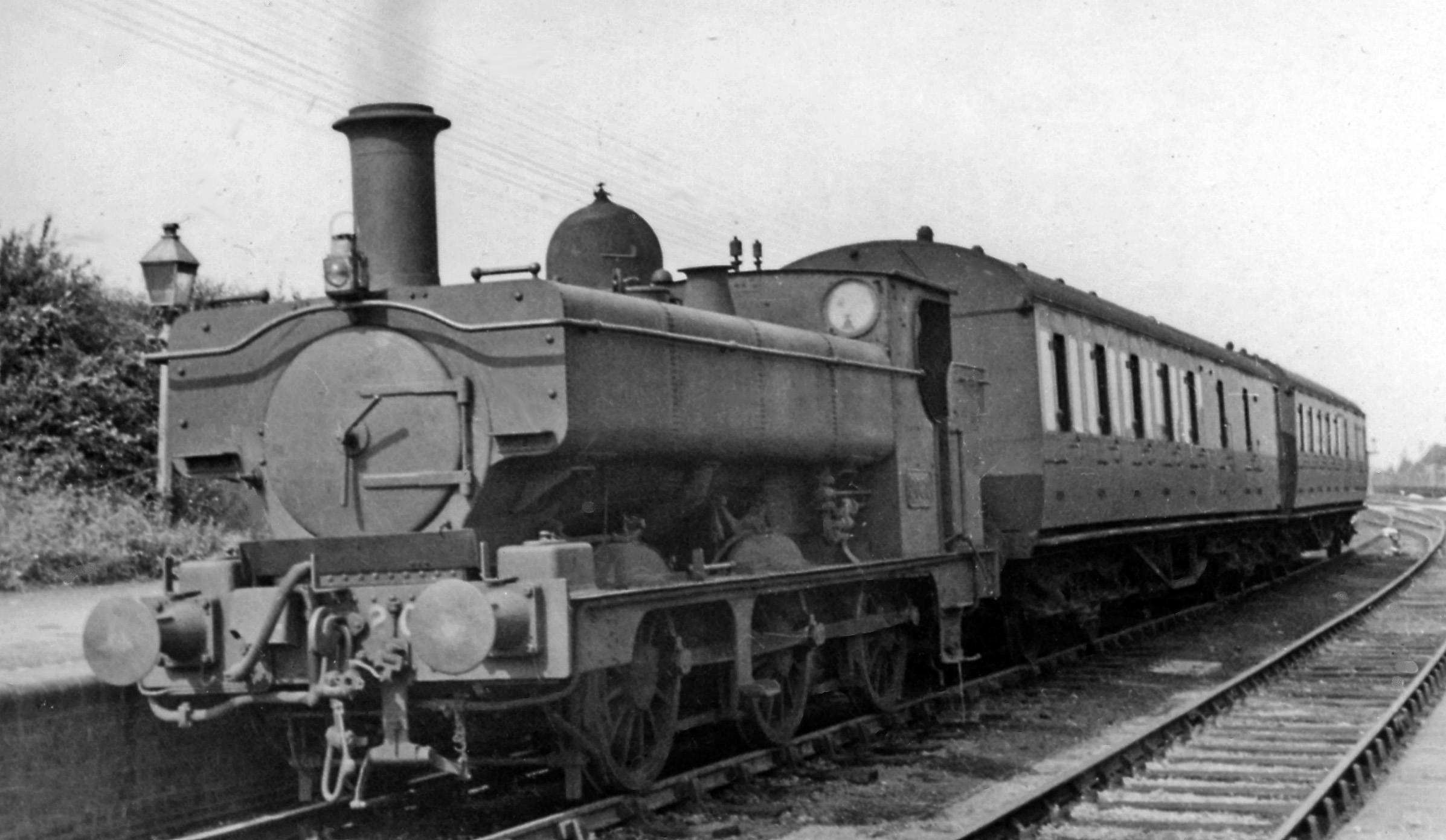
- No. 2080 at Berkeley Road station 1948
Type and origin
- Power type: Steam
- Designer: George Armstrong
- Builder: Wolverhampton, GWR
- Order number: Lots: D3, F3, G3, H3, J3, K3, L3, M3
- Serial number: Works Nos: 625–764
- Build date: 1897 – 1905
- Total produced: 140
Specifications
- Configuration
  - Whyte: 0-6-0ST
- Gauge: 4 ft 8 1/2 in (1,435 mm) standard gauge
- Driver dia.: 4 ft 1 1/2 in (1.257 m)
- Wheelbase: 7 ft 4 in (2.24 m) + 7 ft 4 in (2.24 m), total 14 ft 8 in (4.47 m)
- Length: 30 ft 1 in (9.17 m) over buffers
- Width: 8 ft 2 in (2.49 m)
- Height: 11 ft 10 3/8 in (3.62 m)
- Frame type: Type: Inside; Length: 25 ft 8 in (7.82 m); Width: 7 ft 7 in (2.31 m)
- Axle load: 13 long tons 12+3/4 cwt (29,200 lb or 13.3 t) (13.9 t; 15.3 short tons) full
- Loco weight: 40 long tons 13+3/4 cwt (89,700 lb or 40.7 t) (41.3 t; 45.6 short tons) full
- Fuel type: Coal
- Water cap.: 1,000 imp gal (4,500 L; 1,200 US gal)
- Firebox
  - Grate area: 14.5 sq ft (1.35 m^{2})
- Boiler
  - Model: GWR 2021
  - Pitch: 6 ft 0 3/4 in (1.848 m)
  - Diameter: Barrel: 10 ft 0 in (3.05 m); Outside diameter: 3 ft 9 7/8 in (1.165 m) and 3 ft 9 in (1.14 m)
- Boiler pressure: 150 lbf/in^{2} (1.03 MPa)
- Heating surface
  - Firebox: 92.5 sq ft (8.59 m^{2})
  - Tubes: 926.25 sq ft (86.051 m^{2})
  - Total surface: 1,018.75 sq ft (94.645 m^{2})
- Cylinders: Two, inside
- Cylinder size: Diameter: 16 1/2 in (419 mm); Stroke: 24 in (610 mm)
- Loco brake: Steam
Performance figures
- Tractive effort: 16,830 lbf (74.86 kN)
Career
- Operators: Great Western Railway; British Railways
- Class: 2021
- Number in class: 140
- Numbers: 2021–2160
- Locale: Western Region
- Withdrawn: 1944–59
- Disposition: All scrapped

GWR 2101 Class (differences from 2021 Class)
Specifications
- Axle load: 14 long tons 6 cwt (32,000 lb or 14.5 t) (14.5 t; 16.0 short tons) full
- Loco weight: 41 long tons 0 cwt (91,800 lb or 41.7 t) (41.7 t; 45.9 short tons) full
- Firebox
  - Grate area: 14.7 sq ft (1.37 m^{2})
- Boiler: Outside diameter: 3 ft 10 in (1.17 m) and 3 ft 9 in (1.14 m)
- Boiler pressure: 165 lbf/in^{2} (1.14 MPa)
- Heating surface
  - Firebox: 95.81 sq ft (8.901 m^{2})
  - Tubes: 958.32 sq ft (89.031 m^{2})
  - Total surface: 1,054.13 sq ft (97.932 m^{2})
Performance figures
- Tractive effort: 18,515 lbf (82.36 kN)
Career
- Class: 2101

The GWR 2021 Class was a class of 140 0-6-0ST steam locomotives. They were built at the Wolverhampton railway works of the Great Western Railway between 1897 and 1905. 1897 was the very year of George Armstrong's retirement, so it is uncertain if the design should be attributed to him or to his superior at Swindon, William Dean.

In fact the 2021s were simple enlargements of the Armstrong-designed 850 class of 1874. The changes were fundamentally confined to a longer wheelbase to permit fitting of a larger firebox.

== History ==
The class was built in eight batches:

- 2021-2030 (Lot D3, 1897)
- 2031-2040 (Lot F3, 1897–8)
- 2041-2060 (Lot G3, 1898–9)
- 2061-2080 (Lot H3, 1899–1900)
- 2081-2100 (Lot J3, 1900–01)
- 2101-2120 (Lot K3, 1902–3)
- 2121-2140 (Lot L3, 1903–4)
- 2141-2160 (Lot M3, 1904–5)

Rebuilding with Belpaire fireboxes commenced in the early years of the Churchward era. Unsuccessful attempts to form a saddle tank around the firebox directly led to the switch to pannier tanks. The first pannier tank conversions occurred in 1912, and rebuilding of the majority of the class took place over many years – the last conversion was in 1948, and some were still saddle tanks when withdrawn. In their final form, with or without fully enclosed cabs, first withdrawals started during 1944 110 of them survived into British Railways ownership, (first of the class withdrawn 1952) the last of them being retired in 1959. They were superseded by the short-lived GWR 1600 Class, nominally a Hawksworth design, but in reality a straightforward update of the then 75-year-old design, with new boiler, bigger cab and bunker.

== Coachwork ==
When autotrains were introduced on the GWR, a trial was made of enclosing the engine in coachwork to resemble the coaches. Nos 2120 and 2140 of this class were so equipped in 1906, as were two 517 class 0-4-2Ts. The experiment was unpopular with engine crews, and the bodywork removed in 1911.

== See also ==
- GWR 0-6-0PT – list of classes of GWR 0-6-0 pannier tank, including table of preserved locomotives

== Sources ==
- Ian Allan ABC of British Railways Locomotives, 1948 edition, part 1, pp 16,51
- le Fleming, H. M. (April 1958). White, D. E. (ed.). The Locomotives of the Great Western Railway, part five: Six-coupled Tank Engines. RCTS. ISBN 0-901115-35-5. OCLC 500544510.
- Whitehurst, Brian (1973). Great Western Engines, Names, Numbers, Types and Classes (1940 to Preservation). Oxford, UK: Oxford Publishing Company. ISBN 978-0-9028-8821-0. OCLC 815661.
