= GWR 3571 class =

Class of British steam locomotives

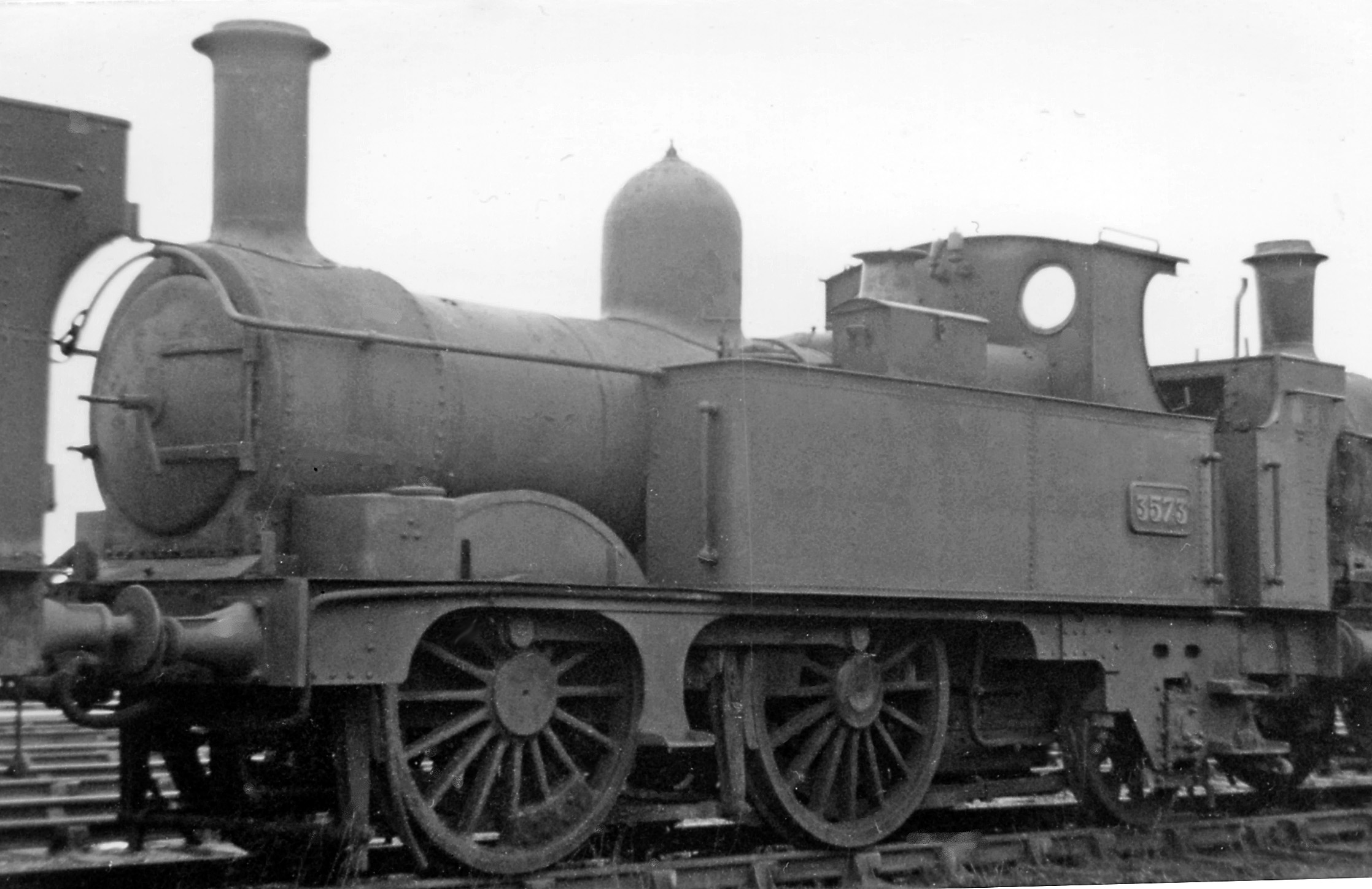
- 3573 on the Dump In March 1947
Type and origin
- Power type: Steam
- Designer: George Armstrong
- Builder: GWR Wolverhampton railway works
- Order number: C3
- Serial number: 595–604
- Build date: 1895 (9); 1897 (1)
- Total produced: 10
Specifications
- Configuration
  - Whyte: 0-4-2T
  - UIC: B1 n2t
- Gauge: 4 ft 8 1/2 in (1,435 mm) standard gauge
- Driver dia.: 5 ft 2 in (1,575 mm)
- Trailing dia.: 3 ft 8 in (1,118 mm)
- Fuel type: Coal
- Superheater: None
- Cylinders: Two, inside
- Train heating: Steam from locomotive boiler
Career
- Operators: Great Western Railway; British Railways
- Class: 3571
- Power class: GWR: Unclassified
- Numbers: 3571–3580
- Axle load class: GWR: Uncoloured
- Withdrawn: 1928-1949
- Disposition: All scrapped

The 3571 Class was a class of ten 0-4-2T tank engines designed by George Armstrong and built at the Wolverhampton Works of the Great Western Railway in 1895-7. The 3571s, numbered 3571–3580 and built as Lot No. C3, were in essence a continuation, and conclusion, of the series of 517 Class built during Armstrong's long period of virtual autonomy at Wolverhampton. They differed from the 517s (apart from No. 1477 in rebuilt form) in that the outside frames were wider, constructed as a continuation of the valence under the running plate. They also differed in carrying larger U Class boilers with longer fireboxes than the R and S Class boilers carried by all but ten of the 517s.

None of the 3571s was ever fitted for autotrain working. They spent most of their lives in the Chester and Birkenhead areas; all but two survived to the 1940s, and three into the British Railways era. The last was No. 3574, withdrawn in December 1949.

== Sources ==
- Tabor, F. J. (August 1959). White, D.E. (ed.). The Locomotives of the Great Western Railway, part six: Four-coupled Tank Engines. RCTS.
