= Class 119 =

Class 119 may refer to:

- DR Class 119, an East German diesel locomotive class
- British Rail Class 119, a British diesel multiple unit class
- DB Class 119, a German electric locomotive class
- GWR 119 Class, a British steam locomotive class
