= Class 108 =

Class 108 may refer to:

- British Rail Class 108
- GWR 108 Class
