= GWR 633 Class =

Class of British steam locomotives

Type and origin
- Power type: Steam
- Designer: George Armstrong
- Builder: GWR Wolverhampton Works
- Order number: M
- Serial number: 167–178
- Build date: 1871–1872
- Total produced: 12
Specifications
- Configuration
  - Whyte: 0-6-0T
- Gauge: 4 ft 8 1/2 in (1,435 mm) standard gauge
- Driver dia.: 4 ft 6 1/2 in (1,384 mm)
- Wheelbase: 15 ft 6 in (4.72 m)
- Loco weight: 34 long tons 12 cwt (35.2 t; 38.8 short tons)
- Cylinder size: 16 in × 24 in (406 mm × 610 mm) dia × stroke
Career
- Operators: Great Western Railway
- Class: 633
- Numbers: 633–644
- Withdrawn: 1928–1934
- Disposition: All scrapped

The GWR 633 Class were 0-6-0Ts designed by George Armstrong and built at the Wolverhampton railway works of the Great Western Railway between November 1871 and April 1872. These were always Southern Division locomotives, but over the years some were fitted to work the Metropolitan lines and played a large role in the transportation of goods from Acton to Smithfield. Unusually for the GWR, they had side tanks instead of saddle tanks and inside frames. Their wheels were 4 ft 6 1/2 in (1,384 mm) in diameter and wheelbase was 15 ft 6 in (4.72 m), with a weight of 34 long tons 12 cwt (35.2 t; 38.8 short tons). There were twelve locomotives numbered 633–644.

== Modifications ==
Nos. 643 and 644 were fitted with condensing apparatus when built, for working on the Metropolitan Railway's Widened Lines and this was added to some others in the 1890s. These were the first six-coupled engines to be accepted for the widened lines. From 1887 they were reboilered with Dean pattern boilers, and the wheels were enlarged by 1 inch (2.5 cm) by means of thicker tyres. The class was reboilered again with Belpaire fireboxes (but not pannier tanks) between 1916 and 1925. 633, 634, and all the others fitted with condensers were sent to the London Division and were cabless to work through then metropolitan tunnels. The ones not fitted with condensers were fitted with a cab and allocated to South Wales.

== Service ==
They were intended for the Southern Division of the GWR. The condenser-fitted engines worked in the London area, others at Neath in South Wales. Withdrawal took place from 1928 to 1934.

== Sources ==
- Allcock, N. J.; Davies, F. K.; le Fleming, H. M.; Maskelyne, J. N.; Reed, P. J. T.; Tabor, F. J. (1968) [1951]. White, D. E. (ed.). The Locomotives of the Great Western Railway, part one: Preliminary Survey. Kenilworth: RCTS.
- le Fleming, H. M. (April 1958). White, D. E. (ed.). The Locomotives of the Great Western Railway, part five: Six-coupled Tank Engines. RCTS. ISBN 0-901115-35-5. OCLC 500544510.
