= GWR 119 Class (tank engine) =

Class of British steam locomotives

Type and origin
- Power type: Steam
- Designer: George Armstrong
- Builder: GWR Wolverhampton works
- Build date: 1878-1883
- Total produced: 11
Specifications
- Configuration
  - Whyte: 0-6-0ST
- Gauge: 4 ft 8 1/2 in (1,435 mm) standard gauge
- Fuel type: Coal
- Cylinders: two
Career
- Operators: GWR
- Retired: 1928
- Disposition: all scrapped

The 119 Class of the Great Western Railway consisted of a series of 11 0-6-0ST locomotives. They were numbered 119-21 and 123-30 and had originally been built in 1861 at Swindon Works as tender engines to a design of Daniel Gooch, part of the 79 Class. Their rebuilding as tank engines was the result of being renewed at Wolverhampton railway works under the tenure of George Armstrong between 1878 and 1883.

== Variations ==
Three were turned out with condensing gear. All continued as tank engines until their withdrawal except for No. 122, which remained a tender engine.

== Use ==
The 119 Class started work in the Northern Division but most of them migrated south, and most of their subsequent rebuildings were done at Swindon. Eventually most were moved to South Wales.

== Rebuilding ==
From 1913 they became pannier tanks with Belpaire boilers fitted to them, as were nearly all other GWR saddle tanks. Most were scrapped by 1928, with No. 120 remaining at Oswestry until 1933.
