= GWR 34 Class =

Class of British steam locomotives

Locomotives Nos. 34 and 35 were a pair of Great Western Railway 0-6-0 steam locomotives built at Wolverhampton railway works under George Armstrong in 1866 as reconstructions of old Shrewsbury and Chester Railway engines bearing the same numbers. The originals had been 0-4-0s with intermediate axles, and the reconstructions were unique among GWR 0-6-0 tender engines in having inside frames and being of the long boiler type. Both spent their lives in the Chester area.
