= GWR 108 Class =

Type and origin
- Power type: Steam
- Designer: George Armstrong
- Builder: GWR Wolverhampton works
- Build date: 1866-1867
- Total produced: 2
Specifications
- Configuration
  - Whyte: 2-4-0
- Gauge: 4 ft 8 1/2 in (1,435 mm) standard gauge
- Driver dia.: 5 ft 0 in (1.524 m)
- Fuel type: Coal
- Cylinders: two
Career
- Operators: GWR

Locomotives no. 108 and 109 were a pair of Great Western Railway 2-4-0 steam locomotives built under the aegis of George Armstrong at Wolverhampton Works, probably in 1866–7, as replacements for locomotives of the same numbers inherited from the absorbed Birkenhead Railway.

== Design ==
They had 5 ft 0 in (1.524 m) diameter driving wheels and, unlike other GWR 2-4-0s, only had inside frames. They were nominally rebuilds but only the wheels of the original locomotives seem to have been used.

== Use ==
They worked in the Chester area and were withdrawn in 1887.
