= GWR Joseph Armstrong locomotives (Wolverhampton) =

Group of British steam locomotives

Between 1854 when the Shrewsbury and Chester and Shrewsbury and Birmingham Railways were absorbed by the Great Western Railway, and 1864 when he moved south to Swindon Works, Joseph Armstrong occupied the post of the GWR's Locomotive Superintendent, Northern Division, at Wolverhampton Works. For ten years the task of providing new locomotives for the GWR's newly acquired standard gauge lines fell jointly to Armstrong and to his superior Daniel Gooch, the railway's principal Locomotive Superintendent who was based at Paddington.

This article deals with the new locomotives designed by Armstrong during his Wolverhampton years. For his later, Swindon locomotives, see the individual articles as listed in the table of GWR Locomotives at the foot of the article.

== The locomotives ==
At the start of his GWR career (1854-8), Armstrong was concerned principally with keeping the motley collection of S&CR and S&BR locomotives in working order, and with enlarging Wolverhampton (Stafford Road) Works. He eventually began new construction there in 1858/9. These were the four classes of locomotive newly built at Wolverhampton during the Joseph Armstrong years:

=== The 7, 30 and 110 Classes ===
These were three differing types of 2-2-2 engine (initially of the Jenny Lind type), though they are recorded as a single class in the GWR diagrams. Nos. 7 and 8 (6 ft 3 in or 1,905 mm driving wheels) were built in 1859, No. 30 (6 ft 6 in or 1,981 mm wheels) in 1860, and the fourth, No. 110 (6 ft 0 in or 1,829 mm wheels), in 1862. These, Armstrong's first new locomotives, already show a strong independence from Gooch's ideas, and reflect Armstrong's work with Thomas Gray at Hull and Brighton. Holcroft discusses a fifth 2-2-2, No.32, but since this was regarded entirely as a renewal of an S&CR locomotive, Tabor does not treat it as part of this series. Nos. 7 and 8 were withdrawn in 1876 and 1883 respectively, but in 1883 and 1887 Nos. 30 and 110 were nominally renewed under George Armstrong as 2-4-0s, officially as members of the 111 class (see below).

=== The 111 and 3226 Classes ===
Nos. 111-114 and 1004–5, originally a series of six 2-4-0s with 6 ft (1,829 mm) diameter driving wheels built in 1863/4. The class was enlarged by George Armstrong in 1866-7 by the addition of another dozen, Nos. 1006-1011 and 372-377, and in 1886-7 by another two by "renewing" singles Nos. 30 and 110. Finally, after years of building only tank engines, Wolverhampton added another six entirely new locos to the class in 1889, Nos. 3226-3231, bringing the class total to 26. Intended for secondary trains, the original 111s were initially shedded at Chester for trains to Birkenhead, to Manchester, and south to Wolverhampton. Some of the later engines were allocated to Hereford, and the class subsequently worked further south, on the Gloucester and Oxford routes. The older locos were withdrawn between 1903 and 1914, while some of the 3226 series (which worked mainly in the West Midlands) remained in service until 1922.

=== The 17 Class ===
Nos. 17, 18, 1002, 1003, 11, 177, 344-346, nine 2-4-0 tank engines built in 1864. Nos. 17 and 18 were numbered 1A and 2A until July 1865; 1002-3, 3A and 4A until Sept. 1866; 227 was 177 until August 1867 and then 238 until July 1870. The class was not uniform but to start with all had back and well tanks, inside frames, and domeless boilers. Soon all were fitted with short saddle tanks instead of the apparently unsatisfactory well tanks. In early days these engines worked from Wellington and Croes Newydd sheds, but later some migrated to south Wales, Swindon, and the London area. They were all withdrawn between 1883 and 1893.

=== The 302 Class ===
Nos. 302-309, eight outside-frame 0-6-0 saddle tanks built in 1864-5. These have slotted frames as on the 360 Class tender engines, to which they roughly correspond. They were the first of the larger type of GWR tank locomotive, and had long lives. No. 302 was still a saddle tank when withdrawn in 1918, but the others became pannier tanks when reboilered with Belpaire fireboxes between 1911 and 1923. The last two withdrawn were Nos. 303 and 306 in summer 1932, after 68 years in service.

== The Armstrong brothers ==
Since 1864 was the actual year in which Joseph Armstrong transferred to Swindon, and George took over at Wolverhampton, it does not seem possible to attribute the 17 and 302 classes to either of the brothers with absolute certainty. Holcroft discusses the classes in his chapters on both brothers, while Tabor simply indicates that the relevant engines were built at Wolverhampton, without specifying their designer.

== Summary table ==
Class	Build date	Number built	Wheel arrangement	Driver diameter	Notes
7	1859-1862	4	2-2-2	6 ft 0 in (1,829 mm) to 6 ft 6 in (1,981 mm)	
111	1863-1864	6	2-4-0	6 ft 0 in (1,829 mm)	Class enlarged by G. Armstrong from 1866
17	1864	9	2-4-0T	unknown	
302	1864-1865	8	0-6-0ST	unknown	

== Sources ==
- Holcroft, Harold (1953). The Armstrongs of the Great Western. London: Railway World.
- Tabor, F. J. (February 1956). White, D. E. (ed.). The Locomotives of the Great Western Railway, part four: Six-wheeled Tender Engines. Kenilworth: RCTS.
- le Fleming, H. M. (April 1958). White, D. E. (ed.). The Locomotives of the Great Western Railway, part five: Six-coupled Tank Engines. RCTS. ISBN 0-901115-35-5. OCLC 500544510.
- Tabor, F. J. (1959). White, D. E. (ed.). The Locomotives of the Great Western Railway, part six: Four-coupled Tank Engines. Kenilworth: RCTS.
