= Railway tire =

Design element of trains

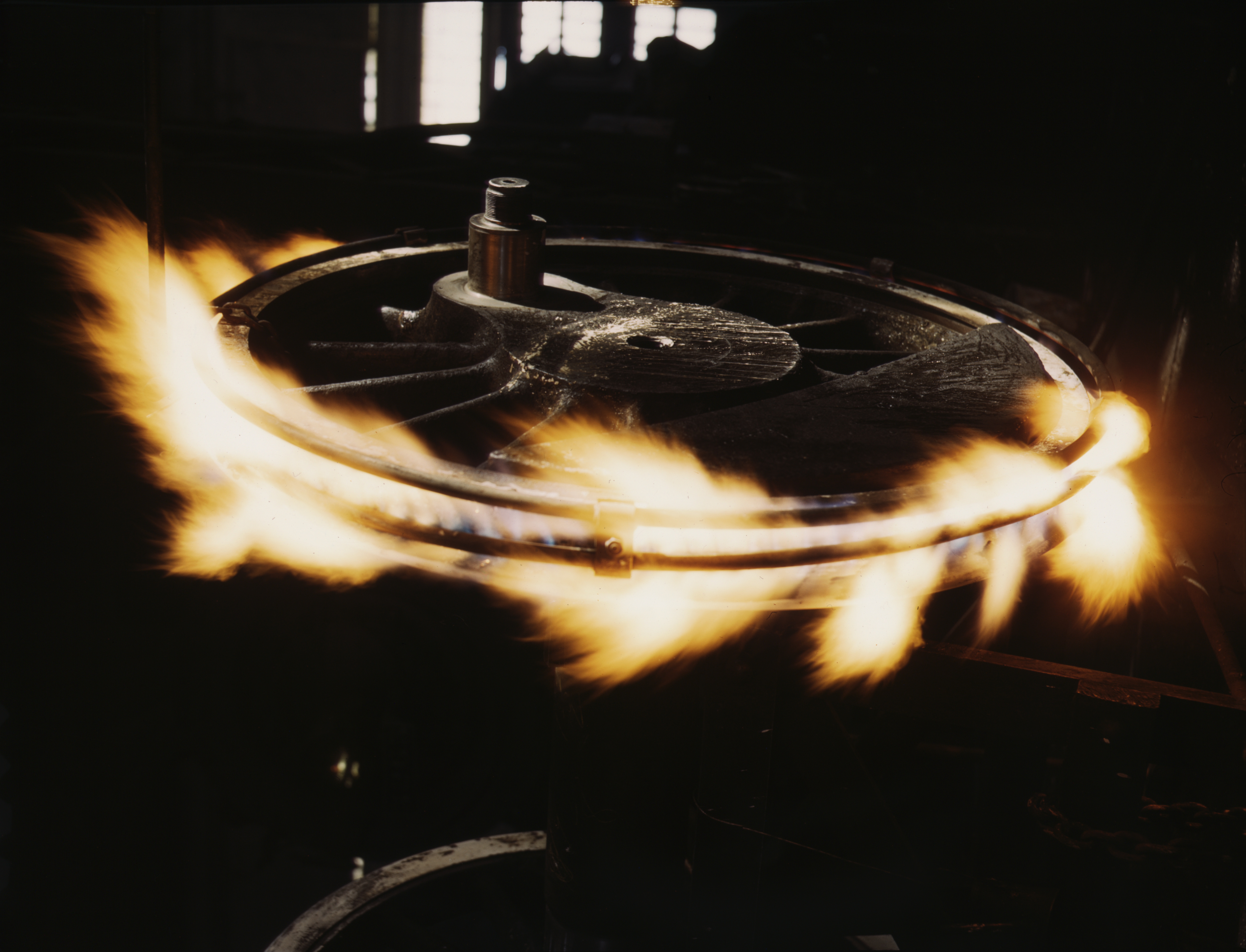
Steel tire on a steam locomotive's driving wheel is heated with gas flames to expand and loosen it so it may be slipped over the wheel.

The steel wheel of a steam locomotive and other older types of rolling stock were usually fitted with a steel tire (American English) or tyre (in British English, Australian English and others) to provide a replaceable wearing element on a costly wheel.

== Installation ==
Replacing a whole wheel because of a worn contact surface was expensive, so older types of railway wheels were fitted with a replaceable steel tire. The tire is a hoop of steel that is fitted around the steel wheel center. The tire is machined with a shoulder on its outer face to locate it on the wheel centre, and a groove on the inside diameter of the flange face. The inside diameter of the tire is machined to be slightly less than the diameter of the wheel center on which it is mounted, to give an interference fit.

The tire is fitted by heating to a controlled temperature, avoiding overheating. This causes the tire to expand. The wheel centre, usually already mounted on the axle, is lowered into the tire which is flange side up. The tire cools, and the retaining ring (a shaped steel bar rolled into a hoop, known as a Gibson ring, after its inventor J. Gibson of the British Great Western Railway) is fitted into the groove. Hydraulically operated rolls swage the groove down on to the retaining ring.

The tire is primarily held in place by its interference fit. The shoulder on the outside and the retaining ring also keep the tire in place if the interference fit is lost. This is most often due to severe drag braking down a gradient, or due to an error in the machining.

Removal of a worn tire is by machining out the retaining ring and heating the tire to relax the interference fit.

Some steam locomotive wheels had tires bolted through the rim, or with a second smaller shoulder machined on the inside face of the tire. This shoulder was severely limited in size as it had to pass over the wheel centre for assembly.

Tires of different designs were fitted to wheels with wooden centers (Mansell wheels in the UK) and to various other types.

The use of tires is becoming obsolete. The utilisation of traditional freight wagons was often so low that tires never needed renewal, so it was cheaper to fit a one-piece ("monoblock") wheel. Monoblock wheels are lighter and offer better integrity as there is no tire to come loose. Modern flow-line repair lines are disrupted by the inspection of the wheel centre once the tire is removed, possibly generating extra rectification work, and the need to make each tire fit its allocated wheel centre. Monoblock wheels are now more economical.

== Causes of damage ==
The most usual cause of tire damage is drag braking on severe gradients. Because the brake blocks are applied directly on to the tire, it can heat up enough to relax the interference fit. It is not feasible to fit the tire with such a heavy interference as to eliminate that risk entirely, and the retaining ring will ensure that the tire can only rotate on the wheel center, maintaining its alignment. In rare instances, the rotation can be so severe that it wears the retaining ring down until it breaks, which could result in derailment.

Severe braking or low adhesion may stop the rotation of the wheels while the vehicle is still moving, causing flat spot on the tire and localized heat damage to the tire material.

Tires are reasonably thick, about 3 inches (75 mm), which allows for a good deal of wear. Provided there is sufficient thickness of material remaining, worn tires or tires with flats are re-profiled on a wheel lathe.

A damaged railway tire was the cause of the 1998 Eschede train disaster in Germany, when a tire failed on a high-speed ICE train, causing it to derail, killing 101 people. The ICE train wheels had a rubber layer between the wheel and the tire to reduce vibration, but that allowed the tires to flex much more than with other wheel designs.

== Non-steel railway tires ==
Some trains, mostly metros and people movers, have rubber tires, including some lines of the Paris Métro, the Mexico City Metro, the Caracas Metro, the Montreal Metro, Sapporo Subway, Seattle Center Monorail, Taipei Rapid Transit System, Santiago Metro and the Uijeongbu LRT
