= Wolverhampton railway works =

Former railway workshops in the UK (1849–1964)

Coordinates: 52.600°N 2.131°W

Wolverhampton railway works was in the city of Wolverhampton in the county of Staffordshire, England. It was almost due north of the city centre, and is commemorated with a small display of level crossing gates and a plaque. Known as the Stafford Road Works, it was opened by the Shrewsbury and Birmingham Railway in 1849 to maintain bought-in locomotives.

Wolverhampton works, located at Gorsebrook, north of Wolverhampton centre, became the workshop of the Northern Division of the Great Western Railway in 1854 under Joseph Armstrong who had been in charge of maintenance for the Shrewsbury and Chester Railway at Saltney. The first 7 ft (2,134 mm) Brunel gauge line arrived at Wolverhampton and the running shed was rebuilt. Locomotive repairs were concentrated in Wolverhampton, while carriage and wagon work was transferred to Saltney.

== Wolverhampton (Stafford Road) TMD ==
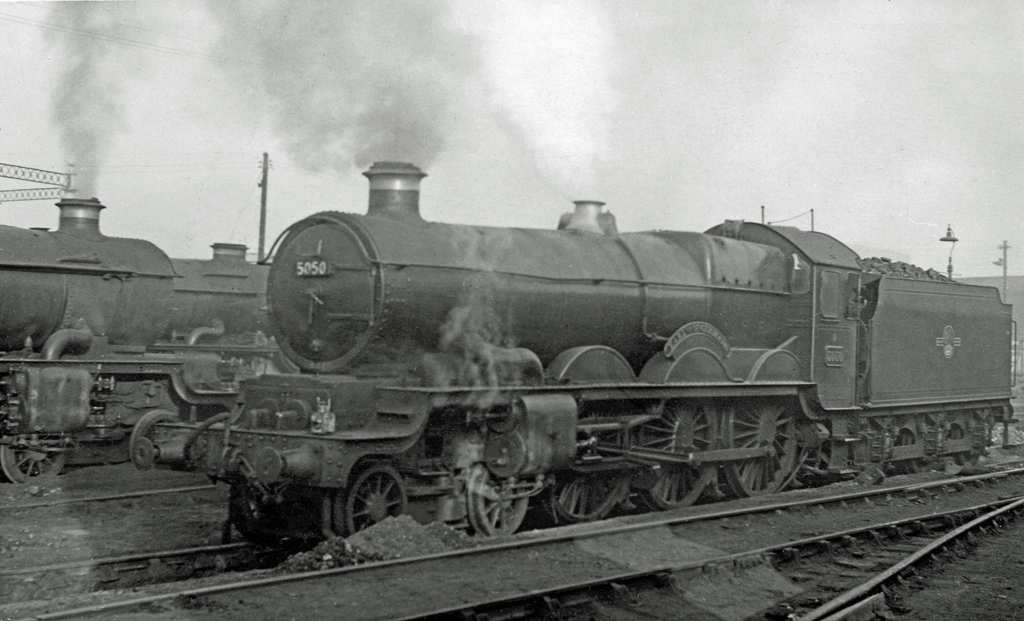
GWR "Castle Class" 4-6-0 5050 "Earl of St Germans" at Wolverhampton (Stafford Road) motive power depot in December 1958.

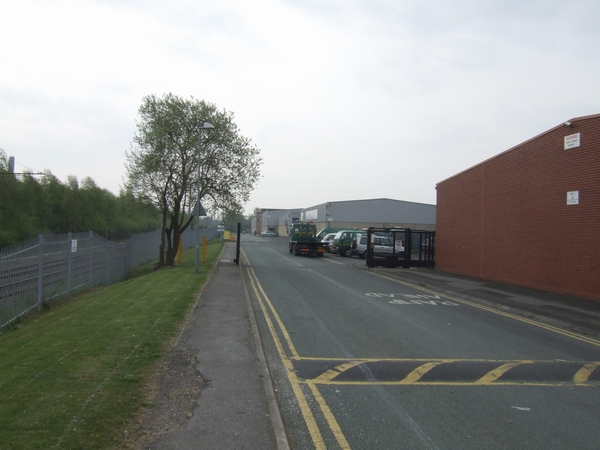
The site of the former Wolverhampton (Stafford Road) TMD in 2007, redeveloped in the late 1960s as a light industrial estate

On reaching Wolverhampton in 1854, the GWR built their own 7 ft (2,134 mm) Brunel gauge shed on the opposite side of the Stafford Road to the existing S&B works, between the road and the LMS line to Crewe. Located opposite and accessible from Dunstall Park railway station, the shed backed onto the Stafford Road, with it throat facing Wolverhampton Low Level railway station.

In 1860, the GWR added a 4 ft 8 1/2 in (1,435 mm) standard gauge Old Oak Common pattern 55 feet (16.8 m) turntable shed, with 28 access tracks all with their own inspection pits. Sheds nos. 2 and 3 were added in the same pattern by 1875, with all turntables across all three sheds increased to 65 feet (19.8 m). But due to site access restrictions, sheds nos. 2 and 3 were not directly accessible from Wolverhampton Low Level.

As the major depot of the region, it was constructed as a heavy maintenance repair shop, to replace the functionality of the old S&B works. Hence under the Loans and Guarantees Act (1929): the old broad gauge sheds were demolished and replaced with new steel-framed sheds nos. 4 and 5; a new lifting and erection shop on the site of the old S&B depot; the salted roofs and timber trusses roofs of sheds nos. 1, 2 and 3 replaced by steel supports and corrugated iron; and a new two-ramp coaling stage plus additional 65 feet (19.8 m) erected on the opposite side of the LMS line, closer to Wolverhampton Low Level. By this time the depot function of the old S&B shed had been replaced by the new standard-pattern two-turntable Wolverhampton Oxley depot, which was on the opposite side of the line, next to the freight yards and closer to Wolverhampton Low Level.

After reallocation of the depot to London Midland Region in January 1963, the decision was taken to close the now run down and highly dilapidated site, concentrating all remaining locomotives and work to Oxley. By this time sheds nos. 2 and 3 were effectively abandoned. The shed closed to all activity in September 1963, and was redeveloped as an industrial estate.

== Locomotives ==
Wolverhampton was expanded in 1858 and began building new standard gauge locomotives in 1859 whilst Joseph Armstrong was in charge. Daniel Gooch, the GWR's Locomotive Superintendent at Swindon, resigned at the end of September 1864 and Joseph Armstrong was promoted to replace Gooch, whereupon J. Armstrong's brother George succeeded him at Wolverhampton. Whilst J. Armstrong was at Wolverhampton, twenty locomotives were built to his designs; after he was transferred to Swindon, 22 more to his designs were built under the superintendency of G. Armstrong.

In comparison with Swindon, Wolverhampton was frustrated by having to maintain a great variety of different locomotives from the various lines that had been taken over. Much of its work, therefore, was in rebuilding and standardisation. However, once new construction started in 1859 (with two 2-2-2s designed by Joseph Armstrong) its independence showed. This was even true of the livery; that of Swindon engines was leaf green with oak brown frames, while Wolverhampton's were dark blue-green with red-brown frames.

Construction during George Armstrong's tenure consisted mainly of 0-4-2 tanks of the familiar 517 Class, and several classes of 0-6-0 saddle tanks, nearly all of which later became pannier tanks, and many of which would survive in that form into British Railways days.

As the broad gauge declined and was finally abolished in 1892, Swindon naturally took over as the GWR's main "narrow" (=standard) gauge locomotive builder. When George Armstrong retired, aged 75, in 1897, Swindon influence grew stronger at Wolverhampton. After producing some 800 locomotives, all new building ceased in 1908. The Works continued to repair and overhaul all classes of locomotive, from the humble tank engine to the King Class and BR Standard locomotives, until it closed in 1964.

Locomotives built at Wolverhampton
Lots (Note: At Wolverhampton, Lots were not identified by number but by letter or letter/digit. No Lots were raised for the first 34 locomotives built.)	Quantity	Wheel arrangement	Class	Years	Refs
—	2	2-2-2	7	1859	
—	1	2-2-2	30	1860	
—	1	2-2-2	110	1862	
—, A	18	2-4-0	111	1863–64	
—	12	2-4-0BT	17	1864–66	
—	8	0-6-0ST	302	1864–65	
—	2	0-6-0	34	1866	
—	2	2-4-0	108	1866–67	
B, C, J, K, L	60	0-6-0ST	1016	1867–71	
D, E, F, G, H, R, S, W, Z, I, C2, M2, P2	144	0-4-2ST, 0-4-2T	517	1868–85	
M	12	0-6-0T	633	1871–72	
O, P, Q	36 (Note: Includes two built for the Carmarthen and Cardigan Railway and three for the South Wales Mineral Railway)	0-6-0ST	645	1872–73	
—	2	2-2-2	69	1872	
T, V, X, Y, J2, L2, O2, Q2, R2, T2, V2, X2, Y2, Z2	168	0-6-0ST	850	1874–95	
A2, B2, D2, E2, F2, G2	72	0-6-0ST	1501	1878–81	
H2	1	0-4-0ST	45	1880	
S2	6	2-4-0	3226	1889	
W2	3	0-6-0	57	1890–91	
A3, B3	52	0-6-0ST	655	1892–97	
C3	10	0-4-2T	3571	1895–97	
D3, F3, G3, H3, J3, K3, L3, M3	140	0-6-0ST	2021	1897–1905	
— (Note: Ordered as Swindon Lot 147, transferred to Wolverhampton)	10	2-6-2T	4400	1905–06	
N3	20	2-6-2T	4500	1906–08	
