= George Armstrong (engineer) =

English railway engineer

George Armstrong (5 April 1822 – 11 July 1901) was an English railway engineer. He was in charge of standard gauge steam locomotives for the Great Western Railway at Stafford Road Works, Wolverhampton, from 1864 to 1897. He was the younger brother of his colleague Joseph Armstrong, but thanks to the special requirements of the GWR at a time when it was split in two by the broad and standard gauges, the brothers were able to work largely independently of each other. George is best remembered for his 0-4-2 and 0-6-0 tank engines; these were long-lived, and even when life-expired they were replaced by Collett and Hawksworth with remarkably similar locomotives, the well-known 1400, 5700 and 1600 classes.

== Biography ==
George Armstrong was born on 5 April 1822. His gravestone states that the place was Bewcastle, Cumberland, and this information is repeated by Marshall. However, Holcroft writes that the family went to Canada in 1817, not returning until 1824, and that consequently George was born overseas. It was presumably in 1824 that the family took up residence near Newcastle at Newburn-on-Tyne, a few miles from George Stephenson's birthplace and at that time at the centre of avant-garde steam locomotive engineering. George later recalled chasing the famous locomotive Puffing Billy on the Wylam Waggonway, and how this inspired him to become an engine driver.

With the exception of two visits to France, George's engineering career followed very much in the footsteps of his brother Joseph, who was five years older than he was. At the age of 14 he started work at nearby Walbottle Colliery, which at that time was a horse waggonway with stationary engines to haul trains up the inclines. Here he worked for the engineer Robert Hawthorn.

In 1840 George and Joseph went to Hull as engineers on the Hull and Selby Railway, then subsequently followed John Gray to Brighton Works on the London and Brighton. At that time British engineering know-how was much in demand on the Continent, and from Brighton George crossed the Channel in order to work for a period on the Northern Railway (Nord) of France. He later recalled how during the Revolution of 1848 he was compelled by the gendarmes to assist in erecting a barricade in the streets of Paris.

Unhappy with the unsettled politics of France, he returned to his brother's side. By now Joseph was assistant locomotive superintendent to Edward Jeffreys, on the Shrewsbury and Chester Railway (S&CR), whose repair works was at Saltney near Chester, and George became an engine driver on the S&CR, subsequently being promoted to locomotive foreman. In 1853 the S&CR pooled its locomotive fleet with that of the Shrewsbury and Birmingham Railway, and Joseph moved south to new, larger locomotive works at Wolverhampton (Stafford Road).

The following year the two brothers became employees of the Great Western Railway when the Shrewsbury & Chester, along with other standard gauge lines, were amalgamated with the mostly broad gauge GWR. Wolverhampton's task at first was to keep the miscellaneous stock of the various standard gauge lines in working order, but from 1858 Joseph Armstrong was ready to start constructing new locomotives there. George became his assistant and works manager.

Between about 1855 and 1863 a talented young engineer named William Dean served his apprenticeship at Wolverhampton. When in 1864 Sir Daniel Gooch retired as locomotive superintendent at Swindon, Joseph was transferred to Swindon to succeed him, and George Armstrong stepped into his brother's shoes at Wolverhampton. Dean remained at Wolverhampton for the time being, as George's assistant.

Because the Great Western now had in effect two independent locomotive works, the scene was set for a difficult personal situation, George Armstrong and William Dean being de facto rivals for the post of Joseph's assistant at Swindon. Appointing George would have smacked of nepotism; furthermore, Dean's youth (he was 18 years younger than George) counted in his favour as, in time, a potential successor. It was with this delicate situation in mind that Joseph decided to continue to give his brother a largely free hand not only in the design of Wolverhampton's locomotives, but even the way they were painted. (Swindon livery was leaf green with black and yellow lining, Wolverhampton's a blue-green shade, lined out in black and white.)

Joseph Armstrong duly summoned the 28-year-old Dean to Swindon in 1868, and nine years later on Armstrong's death Dean was appointed as his successor. George Armstrong's rugged northern character made itself felt - "he didn't give a damn for any man and was taking orders from none. He only gave orders!" he is said to have remarked - and once more he was left to get on with his work undisturbed - for another twenty years, as it would turn out.

One of George's responsibilities was to oversee the running of the royal train as far as the junction with the London and North Western Railway at Bushbury, when Victoria was travelling to or from Scotland; a duty that he undertook more than 120 times. In 1870 he travelled to France again, in order to give engineering advice in the course of the Franco-Prussian War. Once again he found himself participating in a way he disliked, being compelled to defend Paris's city walls with a rifle. This time he resisted the gendarmes in the course of what he evidently recounted as a comic tug-of-war.

George finally retired in 1897, a venerable and much loved GWR character. He died after a fall at a Wolverhampton floral fete on 11 July 1901. He is buried at St. Mary's Church, Bushbury, Wolverhampton (close to the church hall). He was unmarried.

== Locomotives ==
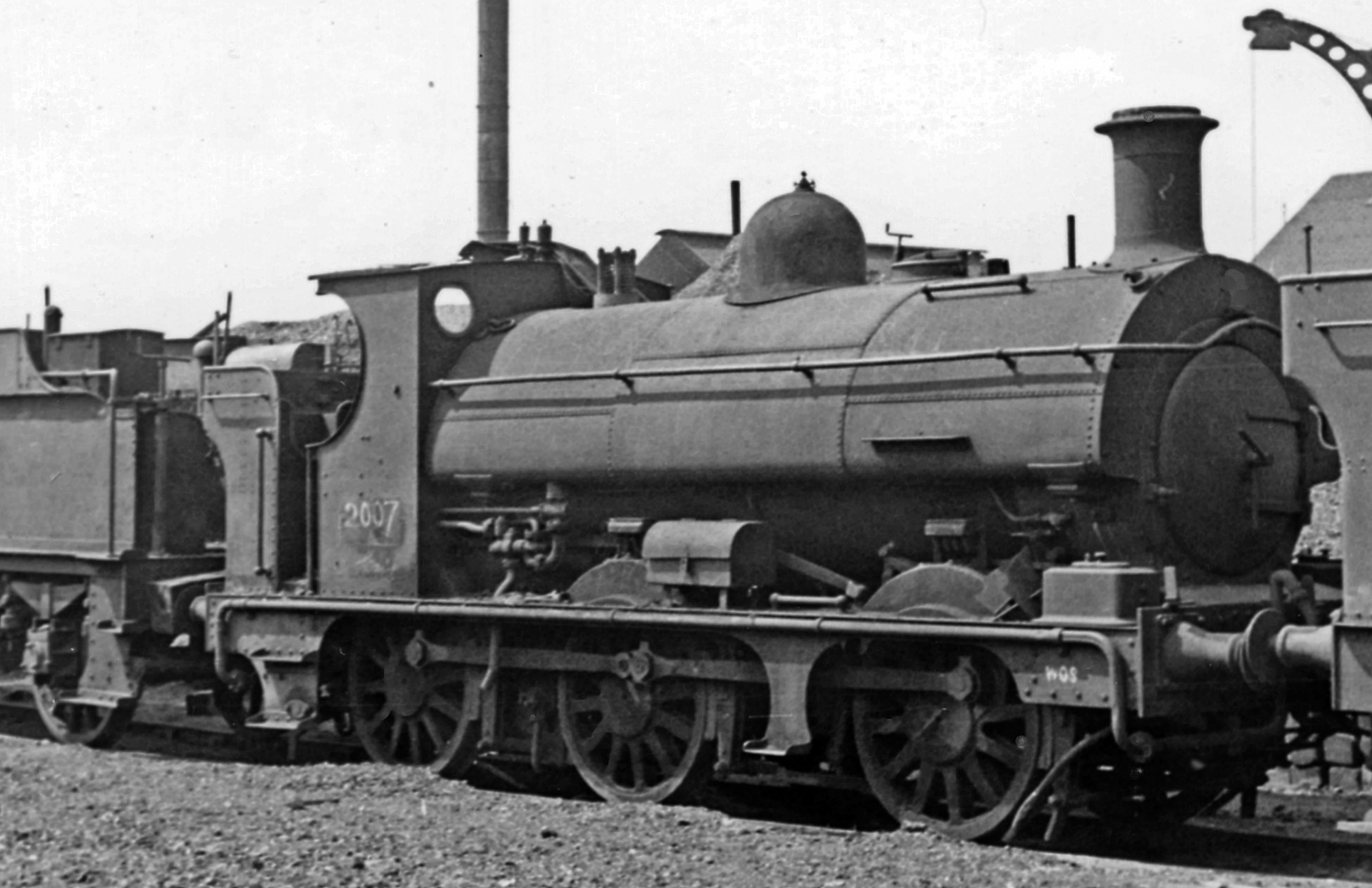
1901 class 0-6-0ST No 2007, which was never rebuilt with a pannier tank, awaiting scrapping at Swindon in 1950

Apart from rebuilds and renewals of engines built elsewhere, according to Holcroft George Armstrong built relatively few tender engines, all of the 2-4-0 and 0-6-0 wheel arrangements and dating from his first years in charge at Wolverhampton. After that the Works concentrated almost exclusively on tank engines of the 0-6-0 and 0-4-2 types, saddle tanks at first, then side tanks (such as the 517 and 645 classes). They were often turned out at remarkable speed. Many of the 0-6-0 saddle tanks were rebuilt as pannier tanks in the time of Churchward, at the time they were fitted with Belpaire fireboxes.

George was in charge at Stafford Road for 33 years, and "during the period he was in control 626 engines built were classified as new and 513 as rebuilds" [the difference between the two often being a matter of accountancy as much as engineering], "a total of 1,139 and an average of about 35 per annum." None of them survive today. Locomotive construction continued at Wolverhampton for a few years after George's retirement, but ceased in 1909.

== See also ==
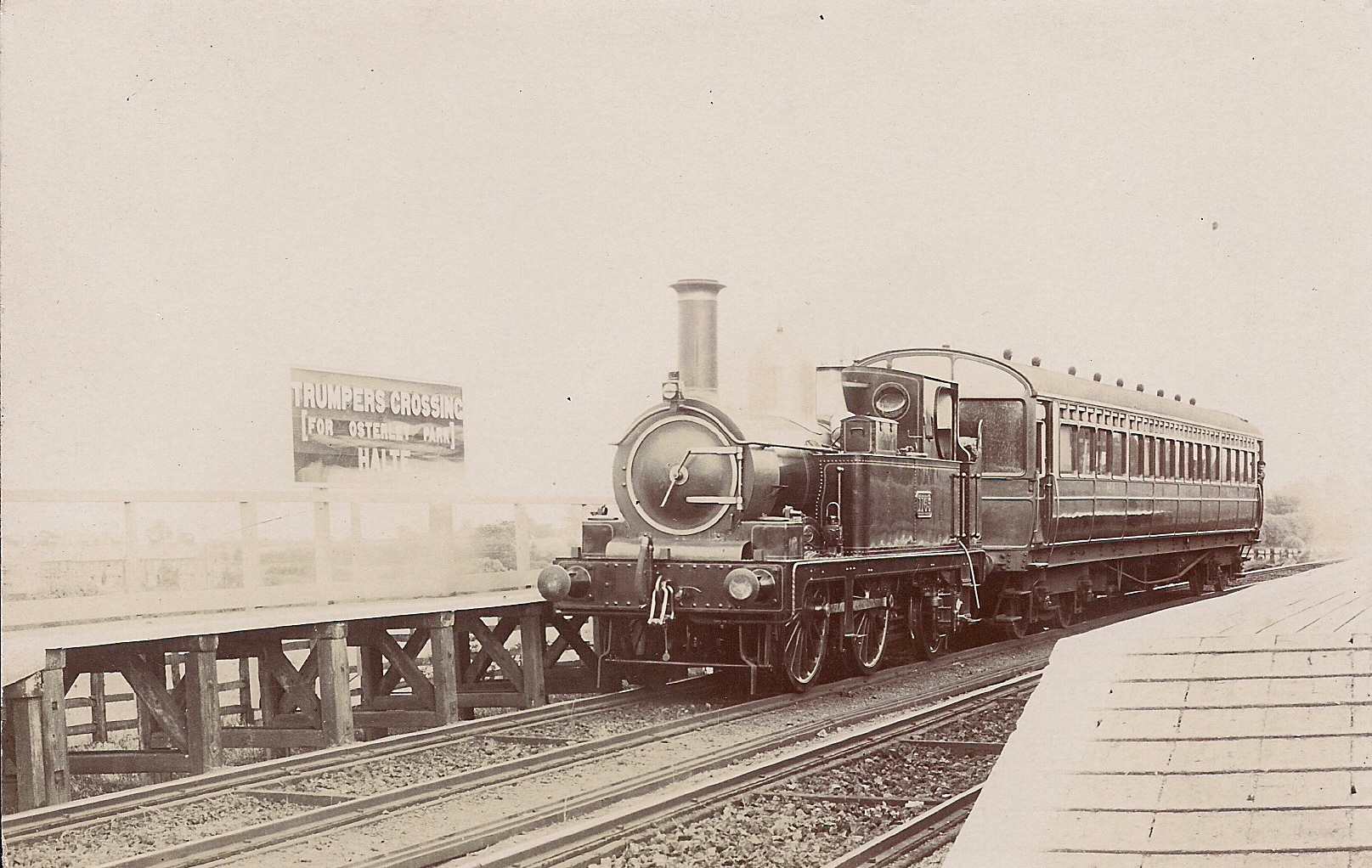
517 Class 0-4-2T No 1165 at Trumpers Crossing Halte

- Locomotives of the Great Western Railway § George Armstrong (Wolverhampton 1864 - 1897)
- List of residents of Wolverhampton

=== Armstrong's locomotive designs ===
- 34 Class 0-6-0
- 108 Class 2-4-0
- 119 Class 0-6-0ST
- 322 Class 0-6-0ST
- 517 Class 0-4-2T
- 633 Class 0-6-0T
- 645 Class 0-6-0ST
- 655 Class 0-6-0ST
- 850 Class 0-6-0ST
- 1016 Class 0-6-0ST
- 1501 Class 0-6-0ST
- 1901 Class 0-6-0ST

== Sources ==
- "Blue Plaques in the North West". Wolverhampton History & Heritage Website.
- Gibson, John C. (1984). Great Western Locomotive Design: A Critical Appreciation. Newton Abbot: David & Charles. ISBN 0-7153-8606-9.
- Holcroft, Harold (1953). The Armstrongs of the Great Western. London: Railway World.
- Marshall, John (1978). A Biographical Dictionary of Railway Engineers. Newton Abbot: David & Charles. ISBN 0-7153-7489-3.
- Reed, P. J. T. (December 1956). White, D. E. (ed.). The Locomotives of the Great Western Railway, part three: Absorbed Engines, 1854-1921. RCTS. ISBN 0-901115-33-9. OCLC 12654357.
- Ian Allan ABC of British Railways Locomotives, winter 1962/3 edition, page 41
- "The Armstrong Family". Wolverhampton History & Heritage Website.
- "George Armstrong". Wolverhampton History & Heritage Website.
- "Walbottle Colliery". Thornley: The Durham Mining Museum. 30 April 2010.
