= William Dean (engineer) =

English railway engineer

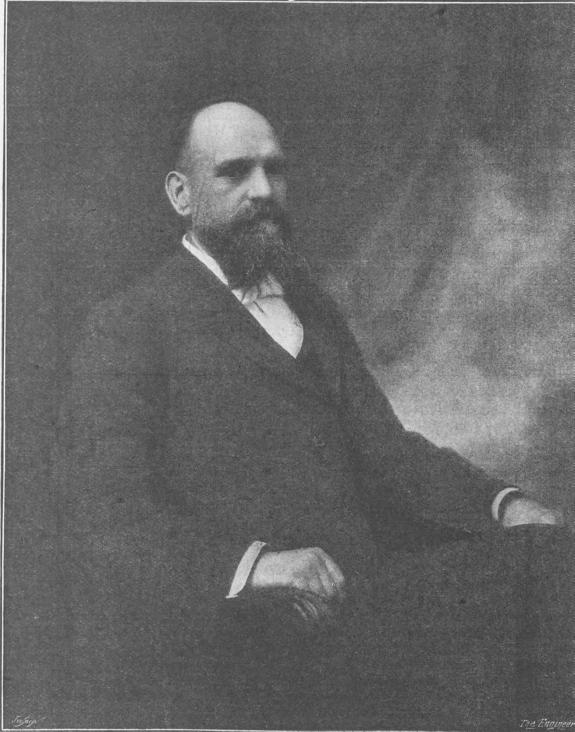
- Born: 8 January 1840
- Died: 24 September 1905 (aged 65)

William Dean (8 January 1840 – 24 September 1905) was an English railway engineer. He was the second son of Henry Dean, who was the manager of the Hawes Soap Factory in New Cross, London. William was educated at the Haberdashers' Company School. He became the Chief Locomotive Engineer for the Great Western Railway from 1877, when he succeeded Joseph Armstrong. He retired from the post in 1902 and was replaced by George Jackson Churchward. He designed famous steam locomotive classes such as the Duke Class, the Bulldog Class and the long-lived 2301 Class.

== Apprenticeship ==
He was apprenticed at the age of fifteen to Joseph Armstrong at the Great Western Railway's Wolverhampton Stafford Road Works. During his eight-year apprenticeship he attended Wolverhampton Working Men's College in the evening, excelling in mathematics and engineering. Upon completion of his apprentice years in 1863 he was made Joseph Armstrong's chief assistant.

== Posts with GWR ==
A year later, Joseph Armstrong was promoted to the position of the GWR's Chief Locomotive Engineer and moved to Swindon Works. George Armstrong, Joseph's brother, succeeded him as Northern Division locomotive superintendent, with Dean under him as Stafford Road works manager. This arrangement lasted until 1868, when Joseph Armstrong made Dean his chief assistant in Swindon. Upon Joseph Armstrong's sudden death of a heart attack in 1877, Dean became Chief Locomotive Engineer.

== Convertible locomotives ==
At this time, the broad gauge was still in use, although conversion to standard gauge was well underway. Several of Dean's early designs were "convertible" locomotives, which could be easily rebuilt into standard gauge.

== Personal ==
Dean was the son of a soap works manager in New Cross, London, and attended the Haberdashers' Boys' School. (He remained a liveryman of the Worshipful Company of Haberdashers to the end of his life.) He married in 1865, and his wife bore him two daughters and a son, but died soon after their third child's birth. He remarried in 1878, but again suffered the death of his wife in 1889.

Dean was ill during his final years as Chief Locomotive Engineer, and he increasingly allowed Churchward to take on the day-to-day responsibilities. He retired in June 1902 to a house that had been bought for him in Folkestone, but died there three years later. His two daughters died before him. A street in Swindon, Dean Street, was named to commemorate Dean's contribution to locomotion engineering. It is located close to the Swindon Works site and would have housed G.W.R. workers.

== See also ==
- Locomotives of the Great Western Railway § William Dean (1877 - 1902)

Business positions
Preceded by Joseph Armstrong	Locomotive, Carriage and Wagon Superintendent of the Great Western Railway; 1877–1902	Succeeded by George Jackson Churchward
