= Frederick Hawksworth =

British engineer

- Born: 10 February 1884; Swindon, England
- Died: 13 July 1976 (aged 92); Swindon, England
- Education: Apprentice Swindon Works
- Engineering career
- Discipline: Mechanical Engineering
- Employer: Great Western Railway
- Significant design: County Class, Modified Hall Class, 9400 Class

Frederick William Hawksworth (10 February 1884 – 13 July 1976), was the last Chief Mechanical Engineer of the Great Western Railway (Great Britain) (GWR).

== Early career ==
Hawksworth spent his entire career at the Swindon Works of the GWR. He joined the company as an apprentice in 1898, aged 15, becoming an apprentice draughtsman in 1905 under George Jackson Churchward. Hawksworth was one of Churchward's "Bright Young Men", and was involved in his revolutionary designs including the general arrangement drawings for "The Great Bear".

Following Churchward's retirement in December 1921, Hawksworth was appointed Chief Draughtsman to his successor Charles Collett where he co-ordinated the work on the King Class. In 1932 he was appointed Assistant, to the Chief Mechanical Engineer, following the departure of William Stanier to the London Midland and Scottish Railway. Soon afterwards he became Principal Assistant. However, having been at the forefront of steam locomotive development, ideas at Swindon Works had somewhat stagnated under the later years of Collett, now in his seventies and whose reluctance to give up the CME's post resulted in Hawksworth's lateness in taking up this position.

According to one obituary, Hawksworth "was instrumental in getting the stationary locomotive testing plant at Swindon modernised and the development of testing practice which took place during the later 1930s was eventually accepted by British Railways as a nation Standard."

== Chief Mechanical Engineer ==
Hawksworth became CME following Collett's retirement at the age of 70 in 1941. He continued in the design tradition which he had been involved in throughout his career, but also made some important improvements. In particular increased superheat started to be fitted to the larger classes under his regime, and the works started to make much more use of welded construction. Another prominent new concept was a tender with slab sides, using welded construction, giving a much smoother appearance than the traditional design with stepped sides and riveted plates.

=== Modified Hall Class ===
His first design to be built, from 1944, was the Modified Hall, a significant development of the Collett design with increased superheat and very different cylinder and frame construction.

=== County Class ===
After the war there were four more new designs, mostly improvements of earlier types. The 'County' Class 4-6-0 was the last and most powerful GWR 2-cylinder 4-6-0, the culmination of a line that began with the 'Saints' 42 years before. The chassis was similar to the modified Hall, but the boilers were to a new design, larger in diameter than the Std 1 (Hall) boiler but smaller in diameter and appreciably shorter than the Castle boiler. This boiler used tooling which was available from LMS 8F 2-8-0 boilers which Swindon had built for the Railway Executive during World War II and was pressed to 280psi, higher pressure than any previous GWR boiler. They used some of the names from the vanished Churchward County Class 4-4-0s.

=== 9400 Class ===
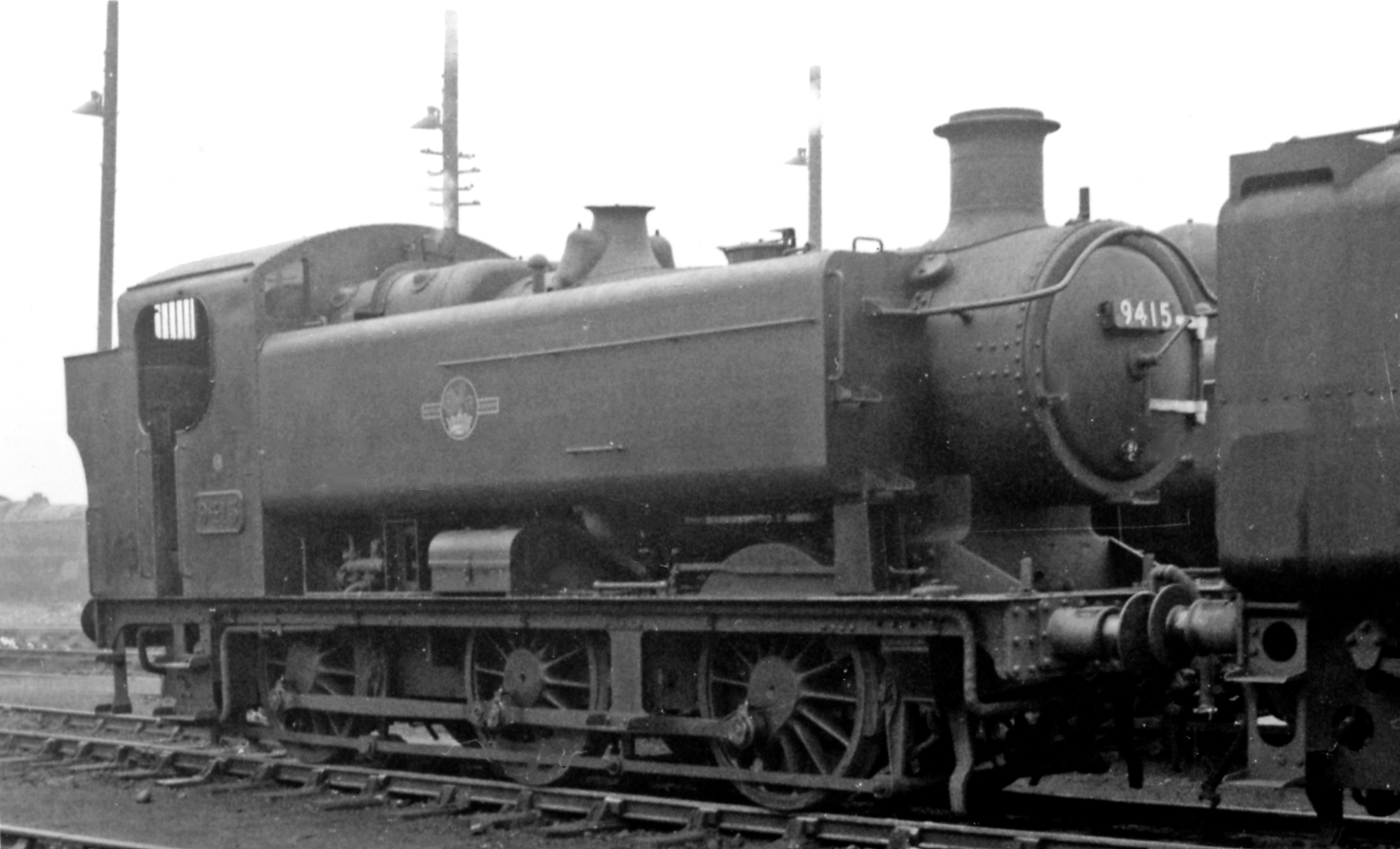
9415 at a yard

The taper boilered 9400 Class 0-6-0 pannier tank, was built in large numbers by outside contractors. These were similar to the 5700 class under the footplate but had a much larger boiler giving them more power and adhesive weight - and thus braking capacity. Only the first ten, built by the Swindon, appeared under the GWR. The last two designs were only seen in British Railways livery.

=== 1500 Class ===
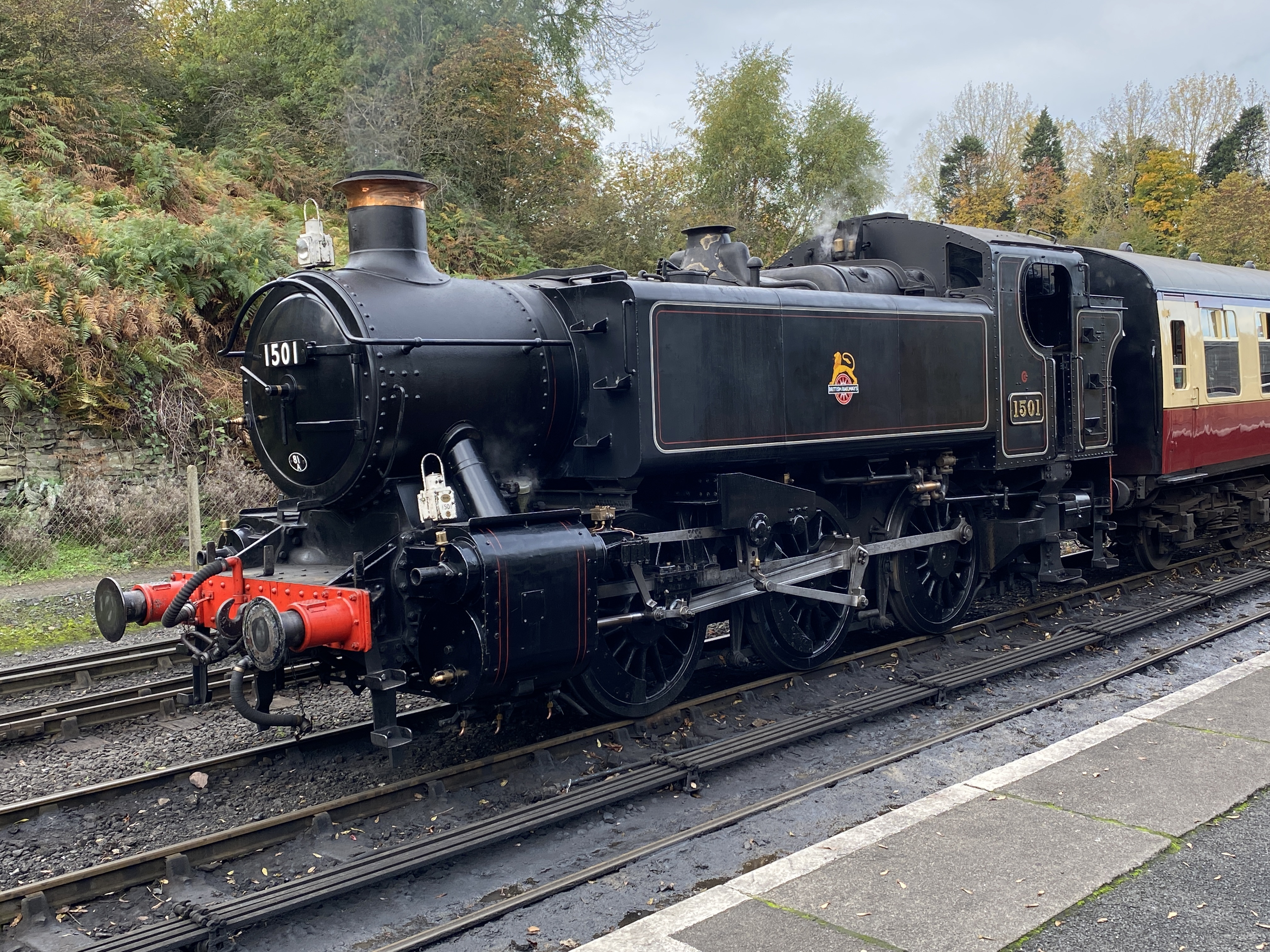
1501 on the Severn Valley Railway, October 2022.

Arguably his most radical design was the 1500 Class. This had the same boiler as the 9400 but an all new short wheelbase chassis with outside Walschaerts valve gear and no running plate, and made considerable use of welded construction. They were designed for easy maintenance by the trackside.

=== 1600 Class ===
The last Hawksworth design was a very light conventional 0-6-0 pannier tank, the 1600 Class. This was a modernisation of the 2021 Class, which was now life expired.

=== Oil firing ===
Between 1946 and 1950, Hawksworth was involved in an experimental effort to introduce oil-firing in place of the coal that, post-war, was being exported to earn currency. It was halted when the increasing price of oil made it uneconomical.

=== Other designs ===
Hawksworth was involved in the ordering of the GWR diesel shunters and two experimental Gas turbine-electric locomotives Nos. 18000 and 18100.

== British Railways ==
Hawksworth remained Chief Mechanical Engineer through the formation of the Western Region of British Railways in 1948, continuing to work on locomotive design until retiring at the end of 1949.

== Retirement and death ==
He was chairman of the Swindon magistrates from 1951 until 1959 and was made a freeman of the borough in 1960. He died in Swindon in July 1976. His ashes are buried in St. Mark's Church, adjacent to the former site of Swindon Works.

== Preservation ==
Examples of all the Hawksworth designs except the 'Counties' survive. The Great Western Society is in the process of building a new 'County', a replica of No.1014 County of Glamorgan, using the frames of a 'Modified Hall', parts of the boiler of an LMS Class 8 2-8-0, and an original chimney from No.1006 County of Cornwall, a regulator from No.1011 County Of Chester, and a reverser from No.1024 County Of Pembroke.

His preserved locomotives are as follows: 'Modified Halls' No.6960 Raveningham Hall, No.6984 Owsden Hall, No.6989 Wightwick Hall, No.6990 Witherslack Hall, No.6998 Burton Agnes Hall, and No.7903 Foremarke Hall. Two '9400' panniers remain, No.9400 and No.9466. Just one of his '1500' and '1600' Classes remain each, No.1501 and No.1638. Another 'Modified Hall' did survive, No.7927 Willington Hall, however its boiler went to the new-built 'Grange' and the frames are being used in the aforementioned replica 'County'.

Some of these locomotives were sent to Barry Scrapyard before preservation, these being Nos.6960, 6984, 6989, 6990, 7903, 7927 and 9466. However, several of his locos sent to this scrapyard were scrapped, including '9400's Nos.8419, 8473, 8475, 8479, 9436, 9438, 9439, 9443, 9445, 9449, 9459, 9462, 9468, 9491, 9492, 9496, and 9499.

== See also ==
- Locomotives of the Great Western Railway § Frederick Hawksworth (1941-1949)
- List of GWR standard classes with two outside cylinders

=== Hawksworth’s Locomotive Designs ===
- County Class 4-6-0
- 1500 Class 0-6-0PT
- 1600 Class 0-6-0PT
- Modified Hall Class 4-6-0
- 9400 Class 0-6-0PT
- Diesel shunters
- Gas turbine-electric locomotives (BR 18000 and 18100)

Business positions
Preceded by C. B. Collett	Chief Mechanical Engineer of the Great Western Railway; 1941–1947	Company nationalised as part of British Railways
