= List of GWR broad gauge locomotives =

This is a list of the 7 ft 1/4 in (2,140 mm) broad gauge locomotives of the Great Western Railway. (Note: This article uses the class groups and names from Sheppard (2008), as the most recent and most authoritative study.) It excludes those purchased from constituent companies, or acquired through amalgamations.

Class	code (Note: Broad Gauge Society class code)	Wheel arrangement	Builder	Driving wheels	Cylinders	Intro- duced	With- drawn	Number built	Names
Thunderer	A01	0-4-0+6		6 ft 0 in	16 in × 20 in	1838	1839	1	Thunderer
Hurricane	A02	2-2-2+6		10 ft 0 in	16 in × 20 in	1838	1839	1	Hurricane
Designs to the Brunel specification	A11	2-2-2	various: Mather, Dixon, Charles Tayleur, Sharp, Roberts, Haigh Foundry			1837	1847	17	Premier, Aeolus, Bacchus, Apollo, Vulcan, Neptune, Ariel, Lion, Atlas, Venus, Viper, (Note: Viper ended its days in the 1860s working the Portskewett Branch of the Bristol and South Wales Union Railway.) Snake, Eagle, Ajax, Planet, Mercury, Mars
Priam	A12	2-2-2	Robert Stephenson & Co.	7 ft 0 in	various	1837	1871	12	North Star, Morning Star, Evening Star, Dog Star, Polar Star, Red Star, Load Star, Rising Star, Bright Star, Shooting Star, Royal Star, Western Star
Priam	A13	2-2-2		7 ft 0 in	15 in × 18 in (Note: later 16 in × 20 in from 1844)	1840	1878 (Note: Six of these locos (Charon, Saturn, Ganymede, Spit Fire, Lethe and Gorgon) were sold to the Metropolitan Board of Works to be stationary engines for pumping sewage.)	62	Spit Fire, Wild Fire, Leopard, Fire Ball, Fire King, Fire Brand, Fire Fly, Charon, Panther, Lynx, Stag, Hawk, Vulture, Cyclops, Falcon, Ostrich, Greyhound, Mazeppa, Arab, Jupiter, Cerebus, Achilles, Milo, Saturn, Arrow, Dart, Hector, Mars, Harpy, Pluto, Castor, Mentor, Lucifer, Minos, Ixion, Mercury, Venus, Gorgon, Hecate, Bellona, Vesta, Actaeon, Centaur, Acheron, Erebus, Medea, Damon, Electra, Orion, Priam, Lethe, Hydra, Phlegethon, Medusa, Proserpine, Ganymede, Pollux, Argus, Phoenix, Pegasus, Stentor
Sun	A14	2-2-2		6 ft 0 in	14 in × 18 in	1840	1849 all rebuilt as 2-2-2ST Wolf class	21	Sun, Sunbeam, Eclipse, Meridian, Comet, Meteor, Aurora, Hesperus, Gazelle, Wolf, Djerid, Javelin, Antelope, Zebra, Lance, Yataghan, Giraffe, Assagais, Rocket, Stiletto, Creese
Priam	A15	2-2-2	GWR	7 ft 0 in	16 in × 24 in	1846	1871	6	Elk, Prince, Peri, Witch (Note: 7 ft 6 in drivers), Queen, Sylph
Great Western	A16	2-2-2		8 ft 0 in	18 in × 24 in	1846		1	Great Western
Alma	A17	4-2-2		8 ft 0 in	18 in × 24 in				Great Western, Iron Duke, Great Britain, Lightning, Emperor, Sultan, Pasha, Courier, Tartar, Dragon, Warlock, Wizard, Rougemont, Hirondelle, Tornado, Swallow, Timour, Prometheus, Perseus, Estaffete, Rover, Amazon, Lord of the Isles, Alma, Balaklava, Inkermann, Kertch, Crimea, Eupatoria, Sebastopol
Alma	A18	4-2-2	GWR	8 ft 0 in	18 in × 24 in	1870	1892	25	Estaffete, Prometheus, Great Britain, Rover, Swallow, Balaklava, Hirondelle, Timour, Iron Duke, Tartar, Sultan, Warlock, Lightning, Amazon, Crimea, Eupatoria, Inkermann, Courier, Bulkeley, Dragon, Emperor, Sebastopol, Alma, Great Western, Tornado,
3001	A19	2-2-2	GWR	7 ft 8.5 in	20 in × 24 in	1891	1892	8	3021-3028
Wolf	A21	4-2-2ST		7 ft 0 in	15 in × 18 in	1849	1871	6	North Star, Orion, Bright Star, Polar Star, Red Star, Rising Star, Shooting Star
Wolf	A23	2-2-2ST		6 ft 0 in	15 in × 18 in	1846	1870	1	Venus
Wolf	A24	2-2-2ST	most rebuilt from Sun class	6 ft 0 in	15 in × 18 in	1849	1876	27	Antelope, Assagais, Atlas, Aurora, Comet, Creese, Djerid, Eagle, Eclipse, Fire Ball (Note: rebuilt from Priam class), Fire King, Gazelle, Giraffe, Hesperus, Javelin, Lance, Meridian, Meteor, Rocket, Snake, Stiletto, Sun, Sunbeam, Viper, Wolf, Yataghan, Zebra
Wolf	A25	2-2-2T	rebuilt from #A11	7 ft 0 in	15 in × 18 in	1846	1872	3	Aeolus, Apollo, Vulcan
Leo	A31	2-4-0		5 ft 0 in	15 in × 18 in	1841	rebuilt as Leo 2-4-0T	18	Elephant, Buffalo, Dromedary, Hecla, Stromboli, Etna, Aries, Taurus, Gemini, Cancer, Leo, Virgo, Libra, Scorpio, Capricornus, Sagittarius, Aquarius, Pisces
Abbot, Waverley before 1865	A32	4-4-0		7 ft 0 in	17 in × 24 in	1855	1876	10	Lalla Rookh, Ivanhoe, Robin Hood, Rob Roy, Waverley, Coeur de Lion, Pirate, Abbot, Red Gauntlet
Victoria	A33	2-4-0		6 ft 6 in	16 in × 24 in	1856	1880	18	Napoleon, Victoria, Leopold, Oscar, Abdul Medjid, Victor Emanuel, Alexander, Otho, Brunel, Locke, Stephenson, Trevithick, Smeaton, Fulton, Watt, Telford, Rennie, Brindley
Metropolitan	A34	2-4-0	rebuilt from Metropolitan 2-4-0T	6 ft 0 in	16 in × 24 in	1865	1873	7	Hornet, Mogul, Azalia, Lily, Myrtle, Violet, Laurel
Hawthorn	A35	2-4-0	Stothert, Slaughter & Co, GWR	6 ft 0 in	16 in × 24 in	1865	1877, (Note: Ten of the 2-4-0 Hawthorns were rebuilt in 1887 as the 2-4-0T Hawthorn class) 1892	26	Hawthorn, Hackworth, John Gray, Murdock, Melling, Gooch, Hedley, Roberts, Bury, Fenton, Dewrance, Foster, Blenkensop, Avonside (originally named Slaughter) on delivery, Beyer, Hawk, Ostrich, Penn, Peacock, Stewart, Phlegethon, Pollux, Sharp, Wood, Acheron, Cerebus
Compound	A36	2-4-0		7 ft 0.5 in	14 in × 21 in + 22 in × 21 in compound	1886	1892	1	8
Dean express 2-4-0	A37	2-4-0		7 ft 0.5 in	20 in × 24 in	1888	1892	2	14, 16
3501	A38	2-4-0	rebuilt from the 2-4-0T 3501	5 ft 1 in	17 in × 26 in	1890	1892	5	3501, 3502, 3505, 3507, 3508
Leo	A41	2-4-0ST	rebuilt from Leo 2-4-0	5 ft 0 in	15 in × 18 in		1874	18	Elephant, Buffalo, Dromedary, Hecla, Stromboli, Etna, Aries, Taurus, Gemini, Cancer, Leo, Virgo, Libra, Scorpio, Capricornus, Sagittarius, Aquarius, Pisces
Bogie	A42	4-4-0ST	R. & W. Hawthorn & Co., two GWR	5 ft 9 in	17 in × 24 in	1849	1880	13	Corsair, Brigand, Sappho, Homer, Horace, Virgil, Ovid, Juvenal, Seneca, Lucretius, Theocritus, Statius, Euripides, Hesiod, Lucan
Metropolitan	A43	2-4-0T		6 ft 0 in	16 in × 24 in	1862	1877, 7 rebuilt to 2-4-0	22	Hornet, Shah, Bee, Gnat, Bey, Wasp, Mosquito, Locust, Czar, Mogul, Kaiser, Khan, Rose, Thistle, Fleur de Lis, Shamrock, Camelia, Azalia, Lily, Myrtle, Violet, Laurel
Hawthorn	A44	2-4-0T	rebuilt from 2-4-0 Hawthorns	5 ft 0 in	17 in × 24 in	1877	1892	10	Melling, Hedley, Roberts, Bury, Beyer, Ostrich, Penn, Stewart, Pollux, Cerebus
3501	A45	2-4-0T	GWR	5 ft 1 in	17 in × 26 in	1885	1890, (Note: Half of the class were rebuilt as 2-4-0 3501 in 1890) 1892	10	3501-3510
3521	A46	0-4-2ST	GWR	5 ft 0 in	17 in × 24 in	1888	1891 (Note: 17 of these rebuilt from 1890 as 0-4-4T 3521 class)	19	3541 – 3559
3521	A47	0-4-4T	rebuilt from the 0-4-2ST 3521 class	5 ft 0 in	17 in × 24 in	1889	1892 (Note: Converted to standard gauge from 1892, but all rebuilt as tender locomotives in the late 1890s.)	18	3541 – 3560 (Note: 3560 was a new build.)
Fury	A51	0-6-0	Nasmyth, Gaskell & Co	5 ft 0 in	15 in × 18 in	1842	1871	4	Hercules, Sampson, Goliah, Tityos
	A52	0-6-0	Stothert, Slaughter & Co	5 ft 0 in	17 in × 24 in	1846		1	Avalanche, rebuilt as 0-6-0ST Banking class
Fury	A53	0-6-0	GWR	5 ft 0 in or 4 ft 6 in	16 in × 24 in	1846	1872	12	Premier, Ajax, Argo, Bellerophon, Vesuvius, Dreadnought, Telica, Fury, Bergion, Briareus, Brontes, Jason
Caesar (Pyracmon)	A54	0-6-0	GWR	5 ft 0 in	16 in × 24 in	1847	1873	6	Pyracmon, Steropes, Caliban, Behemoth, Mammoth, Alligator
Fury	A55	0-6-0	GWR	5 ft 0 in	16 in × 24 in	1849	1869	1	Bacchus
Caesar	A56	0-6-0	GWR	5 ft 0 in	17 in × 24 in (initially 16 in × 24 in)	1851	1880	8	Dido, Volcano, Thunderer, Caesar, Florence, Nora Creina, Hero, Druid
Caesar (Ariadne & Caliph classes)	A57	0-6-0	GWR	5 ft 0 in	17 in × 24 in	1852	1892	102	Flirt, Giaour, Hebe, Pearl, Ariadne, Leander, Cato, Europa, Nelson, Trafalgar, Cicero, Ulysses, Diana, Minerva, Cupid, Coquette, Psyche, Hecuba, Romulus, Remus, Wellington, Monarch, Zina, Brutus, Ceres, Ruby, Flora, Thames, Neptune, Vesper, Iris, Cyprus, Caliph, Janus, Orson, Vixen, Sibyl, Salus, Banshee, Sphinx, Cambyses, Midas, Nimrod, Geryon, Nero, Nemesis, Octavia, Plutus, Zetes, Metis, Rhea, Typhon, Osiris, Pelops, Creon, Panthea, Amphion, Magi, Pallas, Gyfeillon, Mersey, Severn, Tweed, Avon, Esk, Humber, Boyne, Liffey, Shannon, Clyde, Forth, Tay, Wear, Tyne, Wye, Plym, Rhondda, Tamar, Gladiator, Lagoon, Talbot, Warhawk, Warrior, Severus, Sirius, Pioneer, Hades, Chronus, Orpheus, Olympus, Plutarch, Regulus, Cossack, Tantalus, Theseus, Champion, Sylla, Leonidas, Pandora, Xerxes, Luna, Ethon
Swindon	A58	0-6-0	GWR	5 ft 0 in	17 in × 24 in	1865	1892	14	Swindon, London, Bristol, Bath, Windsor, Oxford, Reading, Birmingham, Wolverhampton, Chester, Gloucester, Hereford, Newport, Shrewsbury
388	A59	0-6-0	GWR	5 ft 0 in	17 in × 24 in	1865	1892	20	1196–1215
Banking	A61	0-6-0ST	GWR	5 ft 0 in	17 in × 24 in	1852	1889	5	Avalanche, Juno, (renamed to Stromboli after sale to the South Devon Railway) Iago, Plato, Bithon
Sir Watkin	A62	0-6-0T	GWR	5 ft 0 in	17 in × 24 in	1866		6	Miles, Bulkeley, Sir Watkin, Whetham, Saunders, Fowler
Sir Watkin	A63	0-6-0ST	GWR	5 ft 0 in	17 in × 24 in		1892	6	Miles, Bulkeley, Sir Watkin, Whetham, Saunders, Fowler
1076	A64	0-6-0ST	GWR	4 ft 6 in	17 in × 24 in	1876	1892	50	1228–1257, 1561–1580
