= GWR 157 Class =

Disambiguation page

GWR 157 Class may refer to either of two classes of Great Western Railway engine:

- "Sharps" or 157 Class (ten 2-2-2 locomotives built in 1862 to Gooch's design)
- 157 Class (ten new 2-2-2 locomotives built in 1878 by Dean, supposedly rebuilds of the Gooch engines and also known as "Sharpies" or "Cobhams")
