= GWR 481 Class =

Class of British steam locomotives

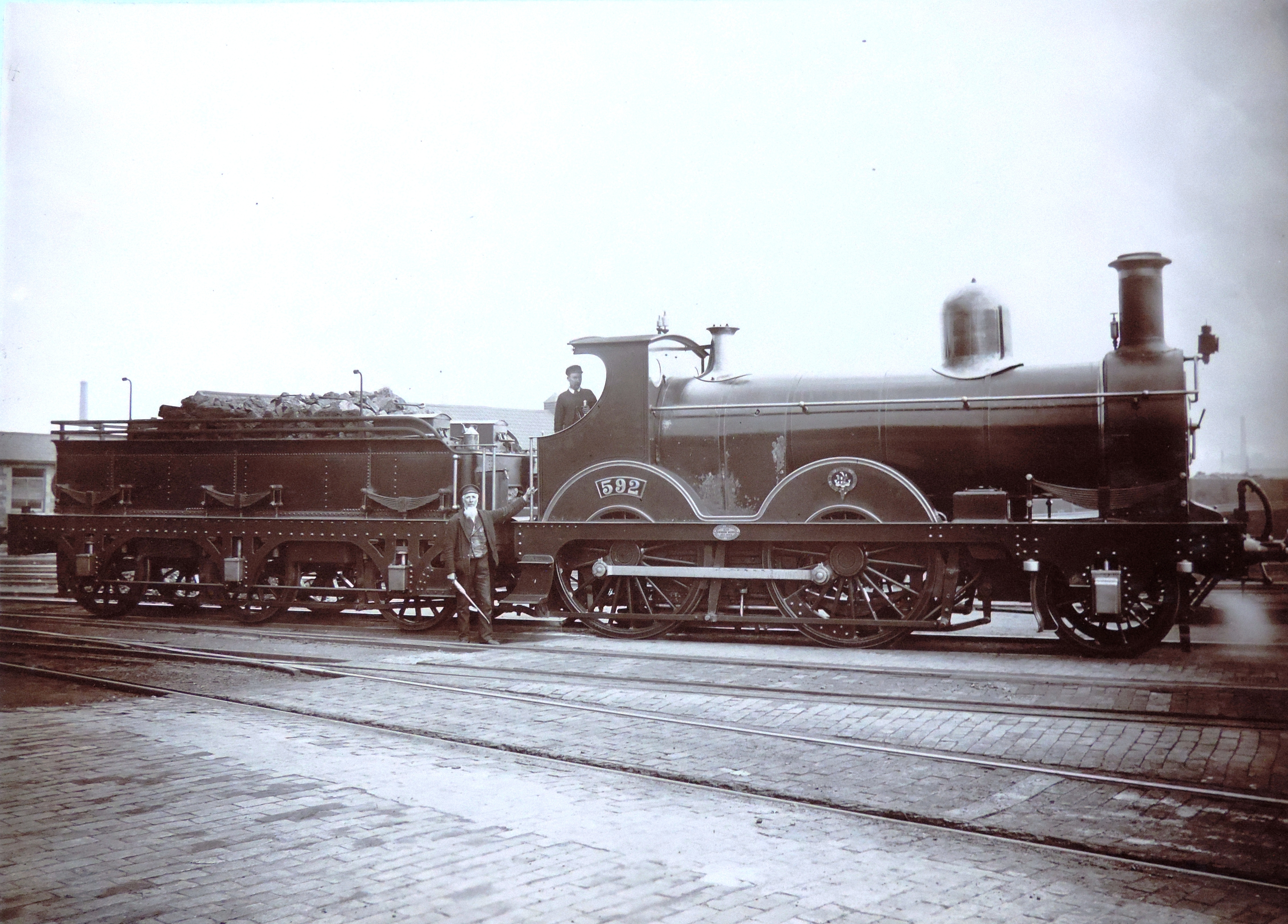
- No. 592
Type and origin
- Power type: Steam
- Designer: Joseph Armstrong
- Builder: GWR Swindon works
- Order number: 20
- Serial number: 195–214
- Build date: 1869
- Total produced: 20
Specifications
- Configuration
  - Whyte: 2-4-0
- Gauge: 4 ft 8 1/2 in (1,435 mm) standard gauge
- Fuel type: Coal
- Cylinders: two
- Cylinder size: (?)
Career
- Operators: GWR
- Retired: 1904–1921
- Disposition: All scrapped

The GWR 481 Class was a class of 20 2-4-0 mixed-traffic steam locomotives designed for the Great Western Railway by Joseph Armstrong and built at Swindon Works in 1869. They were similar in size to the 439 Class but differed in appearance, thanks to the flowing lines of their outside frames.

== Numbering ==
The class was originally numbered (in order of construction): 481-490 and 1122–1131. After the 1870 locomotive stocktake, six of the locomotives in the duplicate list (1122–1127) were renumbered into the capital list as 587–592 to replace withdrawn broad-gauge locomotives; the other four duplicates (1128–1131) replaced standard-gauge locomotives as numbers 12, 19, 20, 54.

== Northern division engines ==
Three of the class - Nos. 12, 19 and 20, which always remained in the Northern Division - were reboilered at Wolverhampton Works under George Armstrong between 1880 and 1890. Furthermore, in 1895 No. 20 was completely renewed at Swindon, as a larger locomotive, joining the 439 Class.

== Southern division engines ==
The remaining engines were allocated to the Southern Division, working to South Wales and Weymouth, and then between Salisbury and Bristol. All were completely renewed at Swindon in 1887–90, using very little of the original locomotives. They were now "very neat little engines"; at this time William Dean added a completely new member of the class, numbered 28. Around 1900 the renewed engines were relegated to secondary duties, and were subsequently withdrawn between 1904 and 1921. No. 485 ran nearly 1,500,000 miles (2,400,000 km).
