= GWR 360 Class =

Class of 12 British 0-6-0 locomotives

Type and origin
- Power type: Steam
- Designer: Joseph Armstrong
- Builder: GWR Swindon Works
- Order number: 8th Goods
- Serial number: 57 – 68
- Build date: 1866
- Total produced: 12
Specifications
- Configuration
  - Whyte: 0-6-0
- Gauge: 4 ft 8 1/2 in (1,435 mm) standard gauge
- Fuel type: Coal
- Cylinders: two
Career
- Operators: GWR
- Retired: 1918-1933
- Disposition: All scrapped

The GWR 360 Class was a series of 12 0-6-0 freight steam locomotives designed by Joseph Armstrong for the Great Western Railway and built at Swindon Works in 1866.

The 360 Class was a small series of twelve 0-6-0 steam freight locomotives designed by Joseph Armstrong and constructed at Swindon Works in 1866. The locomotives were assigned running numbers 360 to 369, 1015, and 1001. Compared to the later and more numerous 388 Class, which entered production later that same year, the 360 Class featured slightly smaller boilers and a coupled wheelbase that was two inches shorter.

Initially, these locomotives operated on routes between Birmingham and Chester, but they were later deployed in South Wales, Didcot, and the Birmingham–Stourbridge area. Withdrawals began in 1918 and continued until 1933. The final locomotive to be retired was No. 363, which had accumulated a total of 1,384,645 miles over its 70-year service life.

== Numbering ==
When built, they were numbered 360 to 371 on the Capital list. In September 1866, the last two were transferred to the Revenue list as 1000 and 1001. In August 1867 it was decided that the Revenue list should start at 1001, not 1000, and so 1000 was renumbered 1015.

== Design ==
They were built with slightly smaller boilers than the similar and much more numerous 388 Class which went into production later the same year. Their coupled wheelbase was also two inches (51 mm) shorter than that of the 388 Class.

== Use ==
They initially worked between Birmingham and Chester, though later they were seen in South Wales, at Didcot and in the Birmingham-Stourbridge area. They were withdrawn between 1918 and 1933, the last (No. 363) having accumulated 1,384,645 miles (2,228,370 km) in 70 years of service.

== Sources ==
- Allcock, N. J.; Davies, F. K.; le Fleming, H. M.; Maskelyne, J. N.; Reed, P. J. T.; Tabor, F. J. (1968) [1951]. White, D. E. (ed.). The Locomotives of the Great Western Railway, part one: Preliminary Survey. Kenilworth: RCTS. pp. 24, 8.
- Tabor, F. J. (February 1956). White, D. E. (ed.). The Locomotives of the Great Western Railway, part four: Six-wheeled Tender Engines. Kenilworth: RCTS.
