= G&SWR 86 Class =

Type and origin
- Power type: Steam
- Designer: Peter Robertson
- Builder: R and W Hawthorn
- Build date: 1852-1872
- Total produced: 10
Specifications
- Configuration
  - Whyte: 0-4-0
- Gauge: 4 ft 8 1/2 in (1,435 mm)
- Driver dia.: 5 ft 0 in (1.52 m)
- Fuel type: Coal
- Boiler pressure: 95 psi (660 kPa)
- Cylinders: two
- Cylinder size: 15 in × 20 in (380 mm × 510 mm)
Career
- Withdrawn: 1872-1873
- Disposition: All scrapped

The Glasgow and South Western Railway (GSWR) 86 class was a class of ten 0-4-0 steam locomotives designed in 1852.

== Development ==
Peter Robertson, the locomotive superintendent of the Glasgow, Paisley, Kilmarnock and Ayr Railway since 1840, remained in post following the merger of this railway with the Glasgow, Dumfries and Carlisle Railway to form the Glasgow and South Western Railway in 1850 until his resignation in 1853.. He ordered ten 0-4-0 locomotives with domeless boilers from R and W Hawthorn which were produced between August 1852 and December 1853. They were numbered 86–95, but the last two were renumbered 5 and 6 in 1854.

== Withdrawal ==
The class were withdrawn by James Stirling during 1872 and 1873.
