= Class 360 (disambiguation) =

Class 360 commonly refers to British Rail Class 360, a type of rolling stock in the United Kingdom.

Class 360 may also refer to:

- Fastech 360
- GWR 360 Class
- Meko 360
- DB Class 360
