= Daniel Gooch standard-gauge locomotives =

Classes of steam locomotives

The Daniel Gooch standard-gauge locomotives comprise several classes of locomotives designed by Daniel Gooch, Superintendent of Locomotive Engines for the Great Western Railway (GWR) from 1837 to 1864.

== History ==
In 1854 the GWR absorbed two standard-gauge lines, the Shrewsbury and Chester Railway and the Shrewsbury and Birmingham Railway to become the GWR's Northern Division. Consequently, from then until his retirement in 1864, Daniel Gooch (the company's Superintendent of Locomotive Engines, a post he had occupied since 1837), although a passionate advocate of the GWR's original broad gauge, of necessity also became responsible for designing standard-gauge locomotives for the new Northern Division. From 1858 the construction of standard-gauge engines started at the newly enlarged Northern Division Works at Stafford Road, Wolverhampton; these were designed by Joseph Armstrong, the Wolverhampton Locomotive Superintendent that the GWR had inherited along with the S&BR.

Alongside these Armstrong locomotives, several other standard-gauge locomotive classes were built during these years under the aegis of Gooch himself, either at the Great Western's principal works at Swindon, or else by outside firms, Swindon and Wolverhampton between them not yet having sufficient capacity for all the necessary new construction. Though these engines were mostly designed by Gooch himself, sometimes the influence of Joseph Armstrong may be evident.

== Classes ==
The classes concerned are as follows:

=== 57 Class ===
Nos. 57–68, twelve 0-6-0 freight engines designed by Gooch built at Swindon in 1855–6. They were typical Gooch engines, resembling his broad-gauge Standard Goods, but narrowed for the standard gauge. On delivery they had to be transported to Wolverhampton on specially constructed broad-gauge wagons. Between 1873 and 1890, all were "renewed" at Wolverhampton – that is, completely rebuilt with minimal use of parts from the original engines – and in 1890–91 William Dean added three more to the class, as Nos. 316–8. The class largely remained in the Northern Division, and the last was withdrawn in 1927. Nos. 60 and 67 ran between 1876/7 and 1886 as saddle tank engines, having been renewed in that form by George Armstrong.

=== 69 Class ===
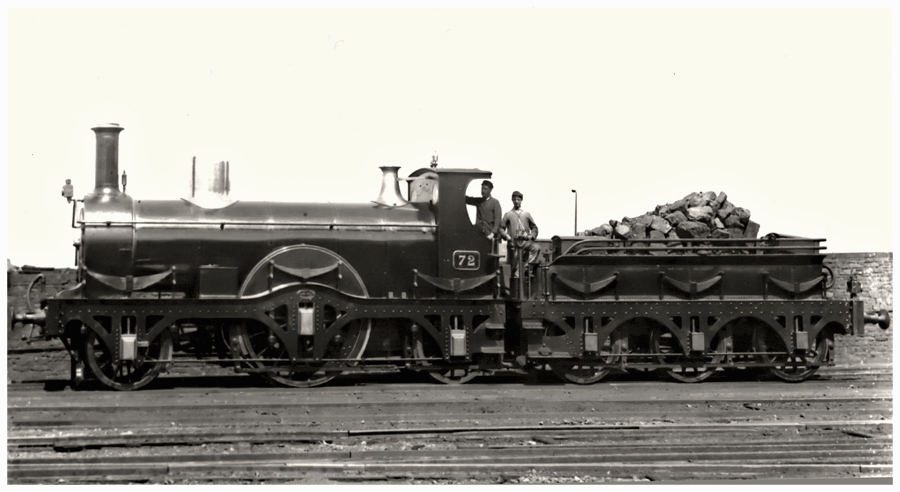
GWR 69 class No. 72, as running 1887–95

Nos. 69–76, eight Gooch 2-2-2s for the Wolverhampton–Shrewsbury line, built 1855–6 by Beyer, Peacock and Company in Manchester. Four of these engines were the very first to be built by Beyer, Peacock at their brand-new Gorton Works. In 1861, when standard-gauge trains started to run through on the mixed gauge to Paddington, the engines moved south to work on the London–Oxford–Wolverhampton sections. In the 1872–75 period, the locomotives were renewed by George Armstrong at Wolverhampton, Cabs were fitted from 1880, and new boilers of a different design were fitted to all except No. 69 between 1887 and 1893. Then in 1895–97, William Dean reconstructed the locomotives once more at Swindon as 2-4-0s of the "River" Class.

=== 77 and 167 classes ===
Nos. 77, 78 and 167–170, seven 0-6-0s built in 1857 and 1861 with boilers to Gooch's design but otherwise designed by the builders, Beyer, Peacock & Co.

=== 79 Class ===
Nos. 79–90 and 119–130, 24 0-6-0 freight engines designed by Gooch and built at Swindon in 1857 (79–90) and 1861–2. Very similar to the 57 class but with smaller driving wheels, they hauled the important coal traffic between Pontypool Road and Birkenhead (carrying fuel for the Atlantic liners, which burned Welsh steam coal). 13 of them were renewed under William Dean at Swindon, and they were withdrawn between 1905 and 1918. The other 11 were rebuilt by George Armstrong as saddle tank locomotives, becoming the 119 class.

=== 91 Class ===
Nos. 91 and 92, two 0-4-0STs supplied in 1857 by Beyer, Peacock & Co., to their own design, for shunting at the collieries around Wrexham. Though No.91 was withdrawn in 1877, its sister had a very long life, surviving until 1942, having spent its last three years as a stationary boiler at Wellington.

=== 93 Class ===
Nos. 93 and 94, built 1860 at Swindon. These were the GWR's first 0-6-0T locomotives. In 1875 and 1877 they were completely renewed at Wolverhampton to become members of the 1901 Class; just before this they are known to have been at Chester and Wolverhampton respectively.

=== 131 Class ===
28 0-6-0s designed by Gooch: Nos. 131–6, built 1862 at Swindon; 137–148, built 1862 by Slaughter, Grüning & Co. of Bristol; and 310–19 built 1864–5 at Swindon. These locomotives used Stephenson, not Gooch valve gear, for the first time at Swindon; this may have been at Armstrong's suggestion. They were later renewed at Wolverhampton.

=== "Sharps" or 157 Class ===
Nos. 157–166, ten 2-2-2s built in 1862 "to Gooch's specifications" by Sharp, Stewart and Company, and closely resembling the 69 Class. In 1879 Nos. 157, 161 and 163 were renumbered 172, 173 and 174 respectively, while the others were "renewed" in 1878–9, that is, withdrawn and replaced by ten officially new engines, William Dean's 157 Class. In their original form, the "Sharps" worked mainly on the Paddington–Wolverhampton expresses.

=== "England" or "Chancellor" Class ===
Nos. 149–156, eight 2-4-0s built in 1862 "to GWR drawings" by George England & Co. at the Hatcham Ironworks, New Cross, Surrey. They were stationed at Wolverhampton for expresses to the north, and were renewed in 1878–1883, also at Wolverhampton.

=== 320 Class ===
Nos. 320 and 321, two 2-4-0WTs built at Swindon in 1864 for working on the underground Metropolitan Railway in London. They were the first standard-gauge engines anywhere to have condensers, though the system was not a success. Within ten years both were converted to tender engines, and they were withdrawn in 1881.

=== 322 or "Beyer" Class ===
Thirty 0-6-0s built by Beyer, Peacock & Co. of Manchester. The first 20, Nos. 322–41, were ordered by Gooch and built in 1864; ten more, Nos. 350–59 followed in 1866, having been ordered by Armstrong. The latter were the last 19th-century GWR locomotives to be built by an outside contractor. Like the 79 Class, they were initially used between Pontypool Road and Birkenhead. Between 1878 and 1885, six were rebuilt at Wolverhampton as saddle tank engines while the rest were withdrawn between 1912 and 1934. Three of the class, Nos. 354, 355 and 388, achieved mileages of over 1,500,000.

== Sources ==
- Holcroft, Harold (1953). The Armstrongs of the Great Western. London: Railway World.
- Tabor, F. J. (February 1956). White, D. E. (ed.). The Locomotives of the Great Western Railway, part four: Six-wheeled Tender Engines. Kenilworth: RCTS.
- le Fleming, H. M. (April 1958). White, D. E. (ed.). The Locomotives of the Great Western Railway, part five: Six-coupled Tank Engines. RCTS. ISBN 0-901115-35-5. OCLC 500544510.
- Tabor, F. J. (August 1959). White, D. E. (ed.). The Locomotives of the Great Western Railway, part six: Four-coupled Tank Engines. RCTS.
