= 439 Class =

439 Class may refer to:

- Caledonian Railway 439 Class
- GWR 439 Class
