= GWR 2361 Class =

Class of British steam locomotives

Type and origin
- Power type: Steam
- Designer: William Dean
- Builder: GWR Swindon Works
- Order number: Lot 67
- Serial number: 1032–1051
- Build date: 1885–1886
- Total produced: 20
Specifications
- Configuration
  - Whyte: 0-6-0
  - UIC: C
- Gauge: 4 ft 8 1/2 in (1,435 mm) standard gauge
- Driver dia.: 5 ft 2 in (1.575 m)
- Fuel type: Coal
- Cylinders: Two
- Cylinder size: (?)
Career
- Operators: GWR
- Retired: 1934-1946
- Disposition: All scrapped

The 2361 Class was a class of steam locomotives of the Great Western Railway. There were twenty 2361s, numbered 2361-2380 and built at Swindon Railway Works at Lot 67 in 1885/6. They were part of an unusual standardisation scheme whereby William Dean designed four double-framed classes with similar boilers but different wheel arrangements, the others being the 1661, 3201 and 3501 classes.

== Design ==
The 2361 Class is sometimes described, erroneously, as the "outside-framed version of the Dean Goods". While there is a superficial resemblance above the running plate, with the 2361s having 5 ft 2 in (1.575 m) diameter wheels and numbered in the same sequence, they are ultimately a separate class. They have a longer cylinder stroke (with a greater tractive effort), larger boiler, and longer wheelbase.

== Use ==
The 2361s were originally allocated to the Worcester Division, and then worked in the London area. Some subsequently worked in the Wolverhampton Division, and at miscellaneous sheds such as Neath, Llanelly, Bristol and Oswestry.

== Withdrawal ==
Most were withdrawn in the 1930s, and all had gone by the end of 1946.
