= Class 378 =

Class 378 may refer to:

- British Rail Class 378
- GWR 378 Class
