= GWR Queen Class =

Class of British steam locomotives

GWR 55 Queen class
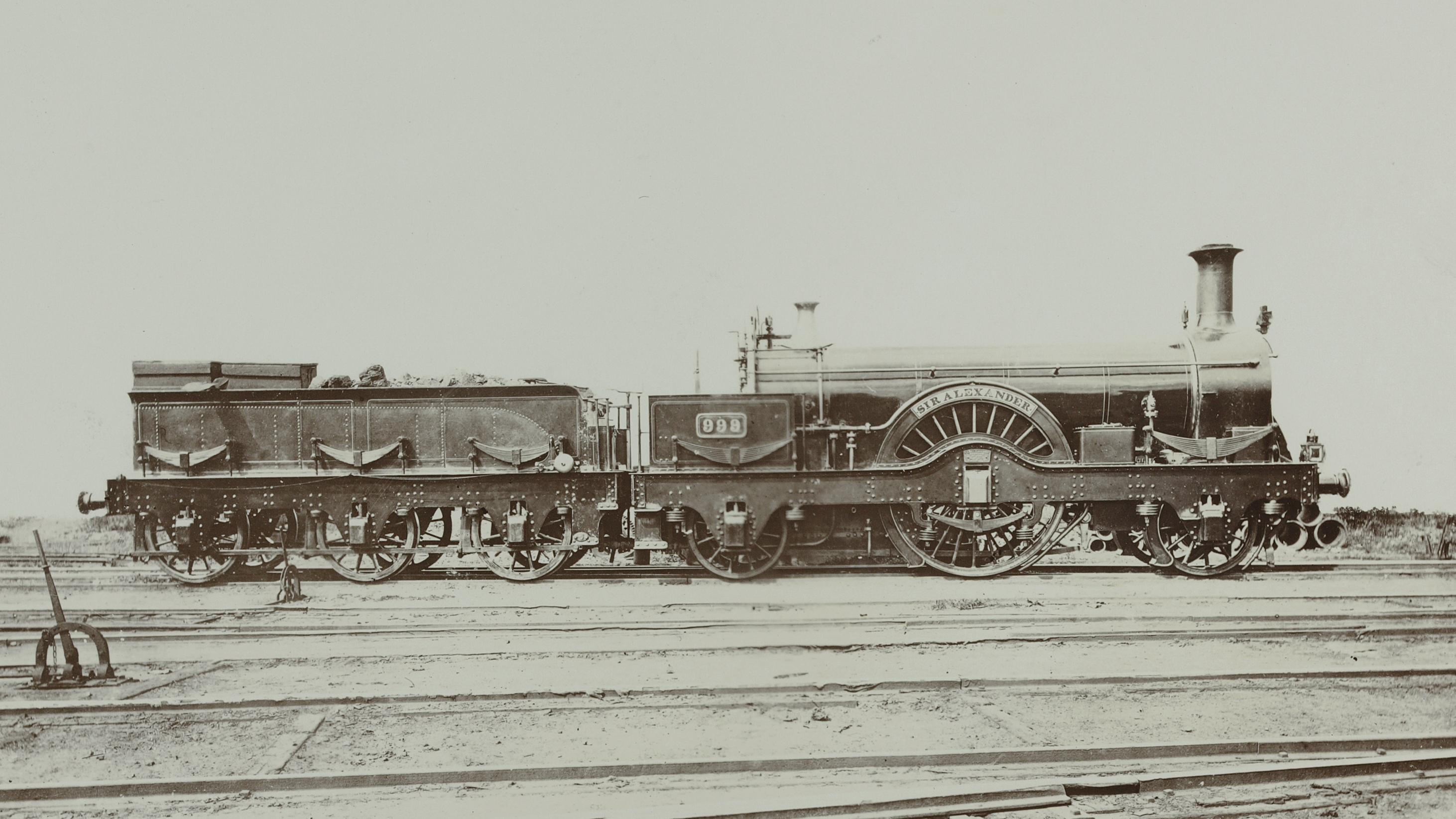
- Locomotive No. 999 Sir Alexander ca. 1885
Type and origin
- Power type: Steam
- Builder: GWR Swindon Works
- Order number: Lots 33, 34
- Serial number: 482, 583–602
- Build date: 1873–1875
- Total produced: 21
Specifications
- Configuration
  - Whyte: 2-2-2
  - UIC: 1A1 n2
- Driver dia.: 7 ft 0 in (2.134 m)
- Cylinders: Two
- Cylinder size: 18 in × 24 in (457 mm × 610 mm)
Career
- Operators: Great Western Railway
- Numbers: 55, 999–1000, 1116–1133
- Withdrawn: 1903–1914
- Disposition: All scrapped

The Queen Class was Joseph Armstrong's last class of 2-2-2 express engine for the Great Western Railway, larger than the Sir Daniel Class of about a decade earlier. They worked express trains for almost 30 years, and were in effect the predecessors of the larger Singles of William Dean.

== The locomotives ==
The "Queens" started life as a single prototype, No. 55 Queen herself, built at Swindon in 1873. A further 20 locomotives were constructed in 1875, numbered 999, 1000 and 1116–1133. No. 999 was named Sir Alexander and sometimes the later series is referred to as the Sir Alexander Class, though in fact the locomotives were essentially the same as No. 55. They all had 7 ft 0 in (2.134 m) diameter driving wheels and 18-by-24-inch (457 mm × 610 mm) cylinders. The class's duties were the expresses on the London-Swindon-Gloucester and London-Wolverhampton routes. Accordingly, No. 55 became the principal GWR royal locomotive, carrying the royal coat of arms for royal journeys, though sometimes this decoration was applied to other, substitute engines.

As with many GWR locomotives of the time, the individual members of the class were much modified in detail, at Wolverhampton as well as Swindon, with the addition of cabs, different chimneys and various types of boiler; some in their later years had Belpaire fireboxes, which gave a much more modern appearance. After 1900, the class was demoted to secondary duties in various parts of the system, and all were withdrawn between 1903 and 1914. All but a handful of these engines had one million miles (1,600,000 km) to their credit at the time of withdrawal.

== Names ==
Ten of the class carried names, as follows:

- 55 Queen
- 999 Sir Alexander
- 1118 Prince Christian
- 1119 Princess of Wales
- 1122 Beaconsfield
- 1123 Salisbury
- 1128 Duke of York
- 1129 Princess May
- 1130 Gooch (temporary name, c.1900)
- 1132 Prince of Wales

== Sources ==
- Allcock, N. J.; Davies, F. K.; le Fleming, H. M.; Maskelyne, J. N.; Reed, P. J. T.; Tabor, F. J. (1968) [1951]. White, D. E. (ed.). The Locomotives of the Great Western Railway, part one: Preliminary Survey. Kenilworth: RCTS.
- Holcroft, Harold (1953). The Armstrongs of the Great Western. London: Railway World.
- Tabor, F. J. (February 1956). White, D. E. (ed.). The Locomotives of the Great Western Railway, part four: Six-wheeled Tender Engines. Kenilworth: RCTS.
