= Railway enthusiasts societies in the United Kingdom =

A railfan or railway enthusiast and sometimes also called a trainspotter is a person interested, recreationally, in rail transport. Railfans of many ages can be found worldwide. To support the hobby in the United Kingdom, railway enthusiast societies or clubs were formed though many are now defunct.

== Long established societies (greater than 20 years) ==
Some railway enthusiast societies in the United Kingdom have been in existence for many years. One such long established society is Railway Correspondence and Travel Society. It was formed in 1928.

The Industrial Railway Society was founded in 1949. It publishes books for the hobby.

The Inter City Railway Society was formed in 1973. It was a breakaway society formed by former members of the Dalescroft Railfans Club. It publishes a monthly magazine called Tracks.

Southern Electric Group (SEG) was formed officially in May 1970.

LCGB – The Locomotive Club of Great Britain.

The Little Midland Society was formed in Chesterfield in 1967.

Another extant society is The Engine Shed Society. As their name implies, they specialise in motive power sheds.

The Heritage Railway Association celebrated its 60th anniversary on 6 January 2022.

== Defunct societies ==
A now defunct society is Dalescroft Railfans Club. It was founded by Dale W. Fickes. This organisation ran road trips visiting motive power depots but also ran railtours.

Another defunct society was the Railway Enthusiasts Society Limited -RESL. This was also founded by Dale W. Fickes. This organisation mainly ran railtours.

Buckley Wells Railway Enthusiasts went out of existence in 1969 following an over ambitious southern trip. Many of the members then helped form NCTS -Northern Counties Transport Society. NCTS went out of existence in 1981 approximately. They published their own magazine.

NCTS was formed from the also defunct BWRE Buckley Wells Railway Enthusiasts and the CRE East Cheshire Rail Enthusiasts. In 2020 it celebrated the 50th anniversary of its founding. NCTS now has its own website to collect memories and photographic evidence from former members. It has actively solicited reliable information from other sources and archives too. This society ran road trips by coach and occasionally minibus touring depots. It was extremely common using this method to regularly see over 300 locomotives in a single weekend. Trips mainly set off from outside Manchester Victoria station on a Saturday evening and return later Sunday evening traveling overnight without hotel stops. They also ran some trips over four days with one overnight on the coach and two nights in hotel/hostel accommodation. They produced a lapel badge (some of which are extant), that was a Class 47 in blue with the name of the society below.

The Longport Rail Enthusiasts, later the Harecastle Railway Society, were formed by a group of friends who attended Wolstanton Grammar School (Staffordshire) in the late 1960s. Headed by the late Paul Davies, and active until the mid 1970s, they organised a number of tours by bus and rail. The core membership still meet occasionally at Stafford Station.

== Publications ==
Most societies publish their own magazines but some especially in the 1970s published spotting books including Dalescroft and NCTS. At one time up until the early 1970s, the market was cornered by Ian Allan. During the TOPS renumbering of the early 1970s, more speedily updated information was required by enthusiasts and so other publishers and enthusiast societies stepped in to fill the need and gap in the market. This market was later cornered by Platform 5 publishing.

== See also ==
- Railfan
- Railway Enthusiasts Society
- Rail transport
