= Thomas Elliot Harrison =

British engineer (1808–1888)

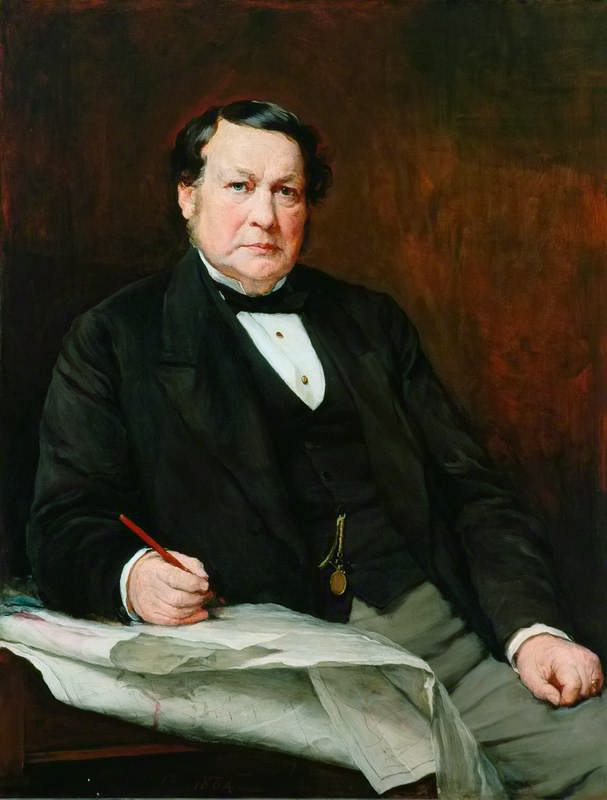
- T.E. Harrison painted by Walter William Ouless c.1884
- Born: 4 April 1808; Fulham, London, England
- Died: 20 March 1888 (aged 79); Whitburn, Sunderland, County Durham, England
- Occupation: Engineer

Thomas Elliot Harrison (4 April 1808 – 20 March 1888) was an English engineer. Born in Fulham, London, he was raised in the north east of England, where his father was a promoter of early railway companies; after an apprenticeship under William Chapman; he gained engineering experience on the lines his father had helped establish, as well as in working in association with George Stephenson and Robert Stephenson during his early career.

In 1850 he became chief engineer of the York, Newcastle and Berwick Railway, and retained that title during the company's amalgamations with other north eastern railway firms, becoming the North Eastern Railway's first chief engineer at its formation in 1854, a position he held until his death in 1888.

The best known works he was involved with are bridges: which include the Skelton viaduct on the Ouse; the Victoria Viaduct and Monkwearmouth railway bridge on the Wear; he was also involved in dock and railway line construction, and engineering consultancy. He was a highly respected member of the British engineering community, and was briefly president of the Institution of Civil Engineers.

He died in 1888, at home in Whitburn, Sunderland, County Durham whilst still working for the North Eastern Railway.

== Biography ==
Thomas Elliot Harrison was born in North End, Fulham, London on 4 April 1808, the son of William Harrison. At the time of his birth his father worked at Somerset House, but he moved during William's childhood to Sunderland, County Durham, where he began business as a ship builder. Thomas received his formal education at a grammar school in Houghton-le-Spring, County Durham, after which he began an apprenticeship under the civil engineering firm of William Chapman and Edward Chapman, Newcastle. Under William Chapman he gained experience in the construction of docks and coal handling equipment.

He completed his apprenticeship in 1829, and travelled to London seeking work. Unsuccessful in obtaining a civil-engineering position, he spent a year working as an accountant's assistant. In 1830 and 1831 he was employed by Robert Stephenson to generate plans for a proposed Wolverton to Rugby section of the London and Birmingham Railway. In 1831 he was employed as a surveyor of a coal railway from Stanhope to Pontop (see Stanhope and Tyne Railway), a scheme of which his father was a significant backer. During the line's construction (from 1832) he was acting engineer. In 1834 he was appointed engineer of the Durham Junction Railway, also backed by his father; he was acting engineer for the construction of the Victoria Viaduct (built 1836–8) on the Durham Junction line. After the amalgamation of these lines, and after the retirement of George Stephenson Harrison became chief engineer of the resultant York, Newcastle and Berwick Railway in 1850, and briefly became general manager in 1853 for the joint working agreements with the Leeds Northern Railway prior a merger in 1854, after which he became chief engineer of the resultant North Eastern Railway (NER). In 1838, two locomotives, Thunderer and Hurricane, to designs patented by Harrison, were built by R. & W. Hawthorn & Co. for the Great Western Railway. They were unsuccessful, and withdrawn from service in 1839.

He remained as chief engineer of the NER for the rest of his life, overseeing its continued growth through mergers and through the construction of new lines. Notable works included the planning or design of: the Tyne Dock at South Shields (1855–1859); the viaducted extension of the Leeds and Selby Line in Leeds from Marsh Lane station to Holbeck (1860s); the Hull to Doncaster Line and its giant Skelton viaduct swing bridge across the River Ouse (1869); and of similar smaller bridges near York (Naburn swing bridge, 1871) and Selby (Selby swing bridge, 1891 posthumous); the North Eastern's new main line station at York, York railway station (1877); and the Monkwearmouth railway bridge, a bowstring, Vierendeel truss bridge over the River Wear at Sunderland on the Monkwearmouth Junction Line (1879); as well as several other new lines and dock works.

In addition to his work as part of the NER he was seventeenth president of the Institution of Civil Engineers from 1873 to 1875, served on the Royal Commission for the Water-supply of London (1867–69), and was successful and respected as an expert witness and consultant engineer, from his work as a parliamentary witness he earned the nickname 'Honest Tom'.

He was not notable as a mechanical engineer, and only slowly accepted the value of the block-signalling system recommended by the railway inspectorate, but was a pioneer in the introduction of the Smith vacuum and Westinghouse air-brake, and introduced equipment to reduce the risk accidents on facing points in 1872.

He lived at Whitburn, but during his career would spend five months of the year in London; in later years he gave up the profitable London work, but remained in the service of the NER. Whilst still working for the company he was taken ill on 20 March 1888 at his home in Whitburn, and died suddenly.

He left seven children from two marriages.

=== Works ===
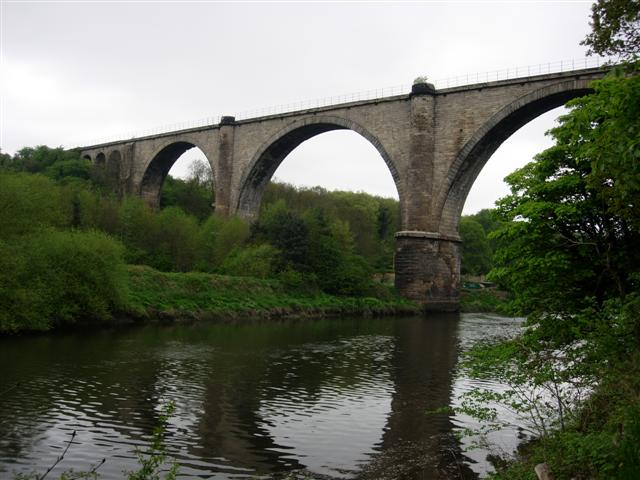
Victoria viaduct, river Wear

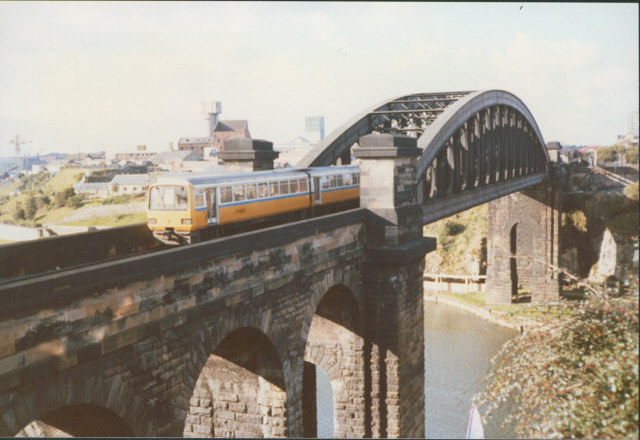
Monkwearmouth railway bridge, river Wear

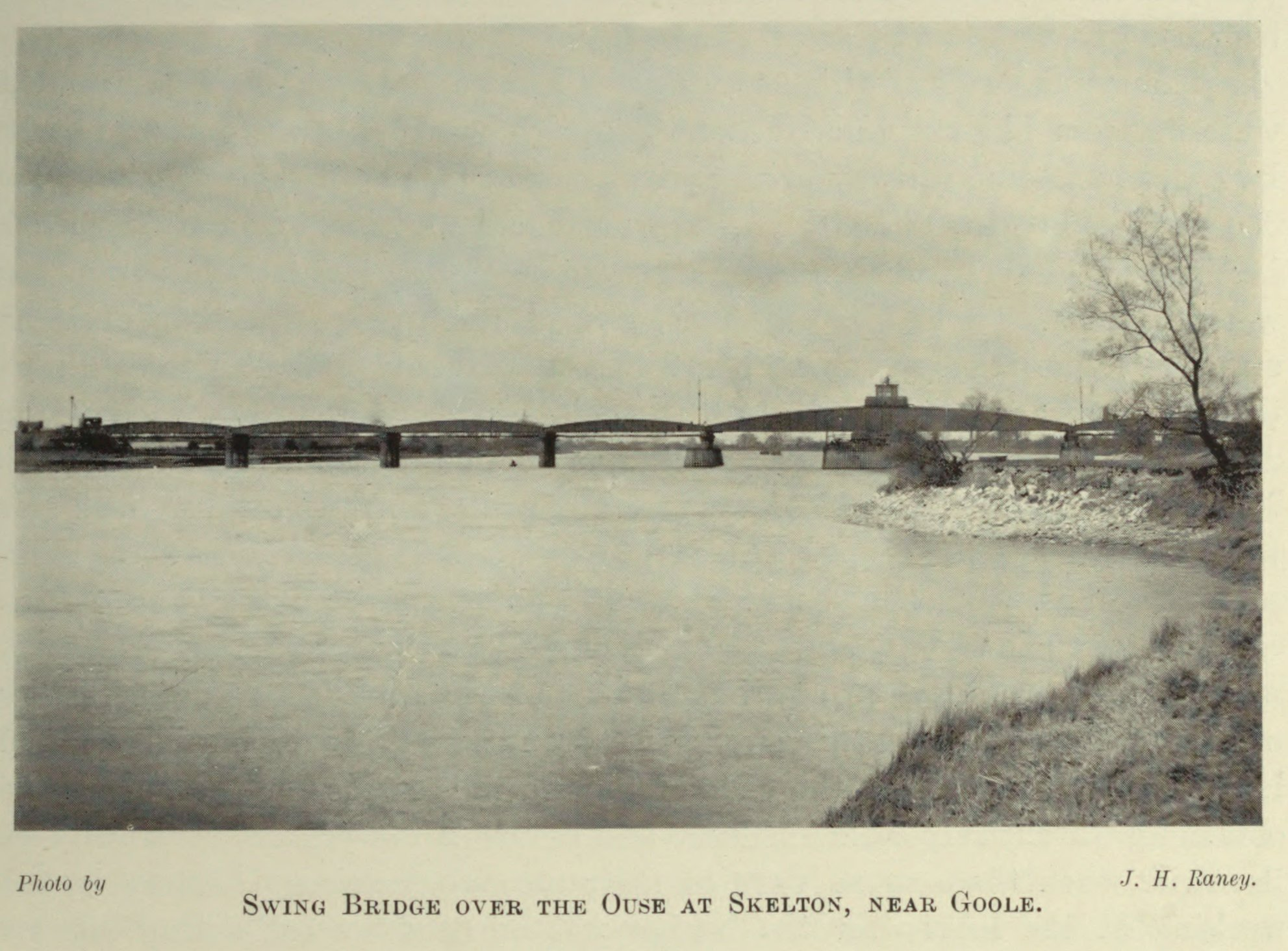
Skelton railway viaduct (swing bridge)

Professional and academic associations
Preceded by Thomas Hawksley	President of the Institution of Civil Engineers; December 1873 – December 1875	Succeeded by George Robert Stephenson
