= GWR 3511 class =

Class of 10 British 2-4-0T locomotives

GWR 3511 to 3520
Type and origin
- Power type: Steam
- Designer: William Dean
- Builder: GWR Swindon
- Order number: 64 (part)
- Serial number: 1016–1025
- Build date: 1885
- Total produced: 10
Specifications
- Configuration
  - Whyte: 2-4-0T
  - UIC: 1B
- Gauge: 4 ft 8 1/2 in (1,435 mm)
- Leading dia.: 3 ft 7 in (1.092 m)
- Driver dia.: 5 ft 1 in (1.549 m)
- Wheelbase: 17 ft 0 in (5.182 m)
- Fuel type: Coal
- Heating surface
  - Firebox: 103.29 sq ft (9.596 m^{2})
  - Tubes: 1,106.57 sq ft (102.804 m^{2})
  - Total surface: 1,209.86 sq ft (112.400 m^{2})
- Superheater: None
- Cylinders: Two, inside
- Cylinder size: 17 in × 26 in (432 mm × 660 mm)
- Valve gear: Stephenson
- Train heating: Steam
Career
- Operators: GWR

The GWR 3511 class were standard gauge 2-4-0T locomotives designed by William Dean for the Great Western Railway and built in 1885.

== History ==
They comprised the last ten of the twenty locomotives of Lot 64. The first ten locomotives of this Lot were built to the broad gauge as the 3501 class.

== Use ==
Originally built with condensing apparatus they were used on work through the Severn Tunnel until the ventilation was improved.

== Rebuilding ==
The condensing apparatus was soon removed and in 1894/5 they were all rebuilt as 2-4-0 tender locomotives of the 3201 class as were the 3501 class.
