= GWR Thunderer locomotive =

1838 experimental British steam locomotive

GWR Thunderer
Type and origin
- Power type: Steam
- Designer: T. E. Harrison
- Builder: R. & W. Hawthorn & Co.
- Serial number: 235
- Build date: 1838
- Total produced: 1
Specifications
- Configuration
  - Whyte: 0-4-0+6
- Gauge: 7 ft 1/4 in (2,140 mm)
- Driver dia.: 6 ft 0 in (1,829 mm)
- Wheelbase: 7 ft 0 in (2.13 m)
- Cylinder size: 16 in × 20 in (406 mm × 508 mm)
Career
- Operators: Great Western Railway
- Number in class: 1
- Withdrawn: 1839
- Disposition: Scrapped

Thunderer was the first of a pair of steam locomotives (the other being Hurricane) built for the Great Western Railway (GWR), England, by R. & W. Hawthorn & Co. whose design was very different from other locomotives. In order to meet Isambard Kingdom Brunel's strict specifications, an 0-4-0 frame carried the 'engine', while the boiler was on a separate six-wheeled frame. The driving wheels were geared 10:27 to reduce the cylinder stroke speed while allowing high track speed, in line with the specifications.

The locomotive was delivered to the GWR on 6 March 1838 and ceased work in December 1839 after running only 9,882 miles (15,904 km), but its boiler section was kept as a stationary unit.

== See also ==
- GWR Haigh Foundry locomotives, further geared locomotives
