= Haigh Foundry =

Ironworks in England

Haigh Foundry was an ironworks and foundry in Haigh, Lancashire, which was notable for the manufacture of early steam locomotives.

== Origins ==
Haigh Foundry was established in the Douglas Valley in Haigh around 1790 by Alexander Lindsay, 6th Earl of Balcarres and his brother Robert, as an ironworks and foundry. The ironworks was not a success but the foundry was, particularly after Robert Daglish became chief engineer in 1804, and the works acquired a reputation for manufacturing winding engines and pumping equipment for the coal mining industry. The foundry was leased by E.Evans and T.C.Ryley in 1835 for 21 years. The partners intended to produce railway locomotives and were later joined by Mr Burrows.

In 1855 Haigh Foundry and Brock Mill Forge were offered for lease. They had manufactured some of "the largest pumping engines and the most powerful factory engines in the kingdom" in the previous decade. The iron works, on the bank of the River Douglas, consisted of a foundry, five cupola furnaces, three air furnaces for making the largest castings and another foundry for smaller pieces. Also on site were blacksmiths' and pattern-makers' shops, an office, a drawing shop, the foreman's house, a boiler yard and an iron warehouse. A water wheel driven by the river powered the machinery, line shafts and furnace blasts. The forge was powered by water and steam. Part of the works where spade making was carried out had Naysmyth steam hammers and a rolling mill. Also for lease was the firebrick and tile works which used fire clay from a nearby pit and had a kiln, drying sheds and steam powered grinding wheels. The manager's house and cottages for workers were part of the lease. A railway line connecting it to the Lancashire and Yorkshire and London and North Western Railways was being built.

== Locomotives and other products ==
Lancashire's first three steam locomotives were built here in 1812, 1815 and 1816 for John Clarke's Winstanley Colliery Railway at Orrell. In 1819, the firm built an 84" cylinder Cornish beam engine and beam engines were also exported to the colonies before 1820. After 1835 the foundry produced 0-4-0 and 2-2-0 type locomotives, many subcontracted from Edward Bury and Company. In 1837 Ajax was supplied to the Leicester and Swannington Railway, followed by Hector, an 0-6-0, a design so powerful that orders were received from a number of other railways.

The company built two broad gauge locomotives with geared drive for the Great Western Railway in 1838 but these were not successful and the gearing was removed around 1840. Four more 4-4-0STs for the South Devon Railway were built to a design by Daniel Gooch in the 1850s (Damon, Falcon, Orion and Priam). The works continued to build locomotives on their account, and under sub-contract. Among these were long boiler types for Jones and Potts and three for T.R.Crampton.

In 1855 two 0-8-0 locomotives for use in the Crimean War, capable of hauling guns up inclines as steep as 1 in 10, were reputed to have been built with horizontal cylindrical furnaces, rather than rectangular fireboxes, and boilers fed by force pumps. They were described as having outside cylinders driving the third set of wheels, while two pairs of wheels were flangeless. The description given here is from the only reference to them from an unreliable list produced in the 1890s. No such engines were recorded in the Crimea, and it is probable they were never built.

When the lease expired in 1856, Haigh Foundry had built over 100 locomotives, produced swing bridges for Hull Docks, ironwork for the Albert Dock in Liverpool and some massive pumping engines. The pumping engine for Mostyn Colliery, Flintshire weighing 30 tons was 17 feet long and had a 100" bore cylinder and it is believed that when built in 1848, it was the largest cylinder in the world. In 1849 the company delivered about 1000 yards of 40 inch cast-iron water pipes for the Manchester Corporation Waterworks scheme in the Longdendale Chain.

== Birley & Thompson ==
The new leasees, Birley & Thompson, concentrated on heavy engineering but made at least two locomotives and quoted unsuccessfully for the Festiniog Railway's 'Prince' class. The company produced stationary engines including a 100" x 14 ft stroke beam engine for the Talargoch Lead Mine (the engine house survives) and a 1000 h.p. McNaught compound beam engine for a cotton spinning mill. Other examples were supplied to many Lancashire collieries.

Until 1860, everything that Haigh Foundry made had to be hauled up the steep and twisting Leyland Mill Lane. Teams of up to 48 horses were needed, many hired from local farmers. However a railway line was built from the Earl of Crawford & Balcarres' colliery network at Aspull in 1860 and was replaced in 1869 by a link from the Lancashire Union Railway's 'Whelley' loop.

The foundry designed and built large winding, pumping and mill engines, heavy engineering and architectural castings until early 1885. The firm's assets were sold in September of that year. Many of the foundry buildings survive along with two cast iron bridges used by the works railway line.
