= GWR 157 Class (Dean) =

19th-century British steam locomotives

GWR 157 class
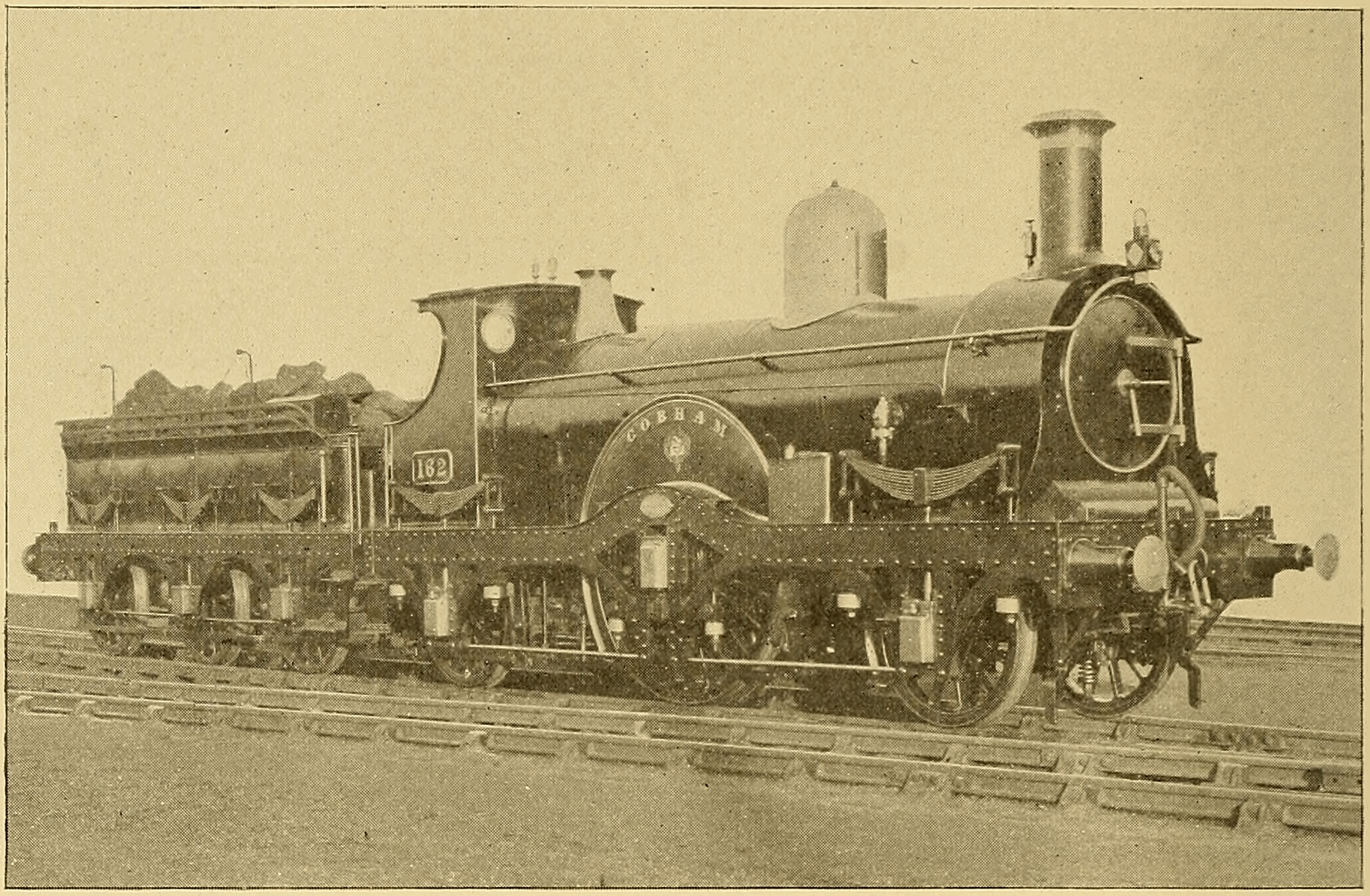
Type and origin
- Power type: Steam
- Designer: William Dean
- Builder: Swindon Works
- Order number: 51
- Serial number: 814–823
- Total produced: 10
Specifications
- Configuration
  - Whyte: 2-2-2
  - UIC: 1A1 n2
Career
- Operators: Great Western Railway
- Numbers: 157–166
- Nicknames: Sharpies or Cobhams
- Withdrawn: 1908-December 1914
- Disposition: All scrapped

The 157 Class of 2-2-2 steam locomotives designed in 1878–79 by William Dean was originally regarded as a reconstruction or renewal of Daniel Gooch's own 157 Class of 1862. But, as was often the case, these Dean engines were new, and had more in common with Armstrong's more recent (and larger) Queen Class, than with the original 157s. The latter had themselves been rebuilds of engines originally built by Sharp, Stewart and Company, which was probably the source of the enduring nickname Sharpies for the new engines. They were also known as Cobhams, after the name carried by No. 162 throughout its life. No. 158 later carried the name Worcester and No. 163 may have been named Beaufort, though this seems uncertain.

The class was numbered 157–166 and constructed at Swindon Works as Lot 51. Some were shedded at Wolverhampton, others at Westbourne Park near Paddington, and they worked on express trains alongside the Queen Class. Most were withdrawn between 1903 and 1906, though No. 165 survived until December 1914.
