= GWR 2301 Class =

British steam locomotive class (1883–1957)

GWR 2301 'Dean Goods' Class
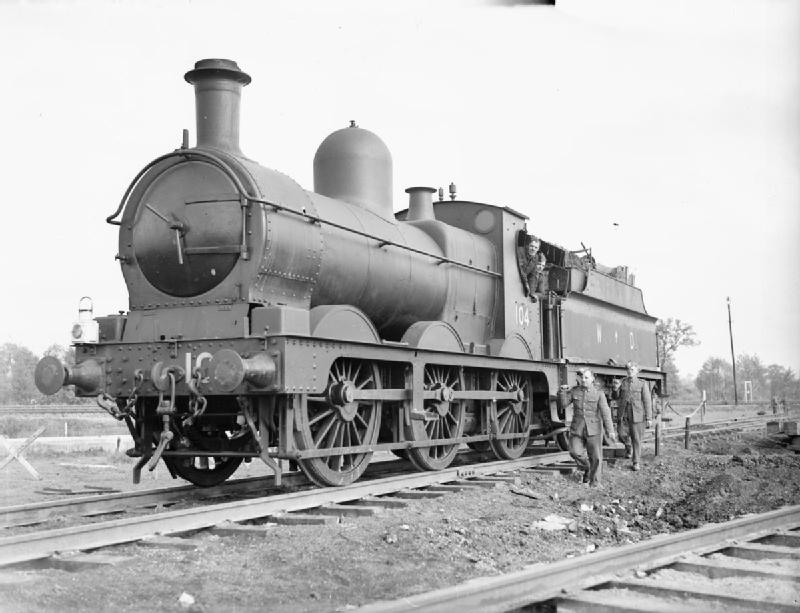
- A class member as a War Department locomotive, Royal Engineers base supply park depot, Rennes, November 1939.
Type and origin
- Power type: Steam
- Designer: William Dean
- Builder: GWR Swindon Works
- Order number: Lots 61, 62, 63, 82, 87, 92, 99, 100, 104, 107, 108, 111
- Build date: 1883–1899
- Total produced: 260
Specifications
- Configuration
  - Whyte: 0-6-0
  - UIC: Cn2g
- Gauge: 4 ft 8 1/2 in (1,435 mm) standard gauge
- Driver dia.: 5 ft 2 in (1.575 m)
- Loco weight: 36.8 long tons (37.4 t; 41.2 short tons)
- Tender weight: 34.25 long tons (34.80 t; 38.36 short tons)
- Fuel type: Coal
- Boiler: GWR 2301
- Boiler pressure: 180 psi (1,241.06 kPa)
- Cylinders: Two, inside
- Cylinder size: 17 in × 24 in (432 mm × 610 mm), 17 1/2 in × 24 in (444 mm × 610 mm) from 1908
Performance figures
- Tractive effort: 17,120 lbf (76.15 kN) or 18,140 lbf (80.69 kN)
Career
- Operators: GWR, BR
- Class: 2301
- Power class: Ungrouped (17 in or 432 mm cyls, 150 psi or 1,000 kPa); A (17 1/2 in or 444 mm cyls, 180 psi or 1,200 kPa)
- Numbers: 2301–2360 and 2381–2580
- Axle load class: Uncoloured
- Withdrawn: 1929-1957
- Disposition: One preserved, remainder scrapped

The Great Western Railway (GWR) 2301 Class or Dean Goods Class is a class of British 0-6-0 steam locomotives.

Swindon Works built 260 of these goods locomotives between 1883 and 1899 to a design of William Dean. The 2301 class broke with previous GWR tradition in having inside frames only and changes were made in the boiler design during the period that they were being built. The first twenty engines were originally domeless though all were provided with domed boilers in due course. They were numbered 2301–2360 and 2381–2580 (2361–2380 were of the 2361 class, which were similar visually but had outside frames).

== Construction ==
Table of orders and numbers
Year	Quantity	Lot No.	Works Nos.	Locomotive numbers	Notes
1883	20	61	946–965	2301–2320	
1884	20	62	966–985	2321–2340	
1884	20	63	986–1005	2341–2360	
1890	20	82	1181–1200	2381–2400	
1891–92	30	87	1271–1300	2401–2430	
1893	20	92	1361–1380	2431–2450	
1895–96	20	99	1453–1472	2451–2470	
1896	20	100	1473–1492	2471–2490	
1896	20	104	1511–1530	2491–2510	Rebuilt as 2-6-2T locomotives in 1907
1897	20	107	1552–1571	2511–2530	
1897	20	108	1572–1591	2531–2550	
1897–99	30	111	1632–1661	2551–2580	

== Rebuild as 3901 class ==
In 1907, twenty Dean Goods (numbers 2491-2510) were rebuilt as 2-6-2T 'Prairie' tank locos, forming the new 3901 class numbers 3901-3920.

== War Service ==
In 1917, 62 engines were taken over by the Railway Operating Division and sent to France. 46 of these engines returned to England in the early summer of 1919, but the other 16 had been sent on to Salonika at the beginning of 1918. Two of these engines, nos 2308 and 2542, were sold to the Ottoman railways and renumbered 110 and 111. No 111 was withdrawn in September 1929, but 110 lasted until the 1950s. Of the 14 engines remaining at Salonika, five were written-off and the other nine returned to England in April 1921.

At the outbreak of the Second World War, the War Department requisitioned 100 of these engines from the GWR and the GWR had to hastily reinstate some engines that had been recently withdrawn. The requisitioned engines were fitted with Westinghouse brakes and 10 were fitted with pannier tanks and condensing gear. All were painted black with their WD numbers painted on. In December 1940, the War Department requisitioned a further 8 engines. The War Department renumbered the locomotives 93 to 200.

At the time of the German invasion of France, 79 of these engines had been shipped to France. Some of the engines were destroyed in the retreat to Dunkirk whilst the remainder were used on the French railways by the German occupation forces. After the war, between 22 and 26 engines were sent to China under UNRRA auspices (where they were classified as class XK3), and 30 were returned to the UK, but were deemed unfit for service and scrapped. No.2435 (WD no.188) was sent to France in 1940 and was used in Silesia and then in Austria between 1944 and 1948 when it was claimed by the Russians before being handed back to the Austrians in 1952. Two further engines, nos. 2419 and 2526 (WD nos. 106 and 132). One locomotive, no.2489 (WD no.142), was in eastern Germany at the end of the War and was taken into Deutsche Reichsbahn (East Germany) stock as 53 7607; it was withdrawn in 1955. The remaining engines are assumed to have been scrapped.

Of the engines that remained in England, most of them worked at War Department and Ordnance depots around the country, though in 1943, 6 were shipped to Tunisia and thence to Italy.

Some locomotives of the class have the unusual distinction of being shipped overseas in both World Wars. 32 of the 108 locomotives requisitioned during the Second World War had been previously requisitioned during the First World War, and of those 32, 24 were again sent overseas.

== British Railways ==
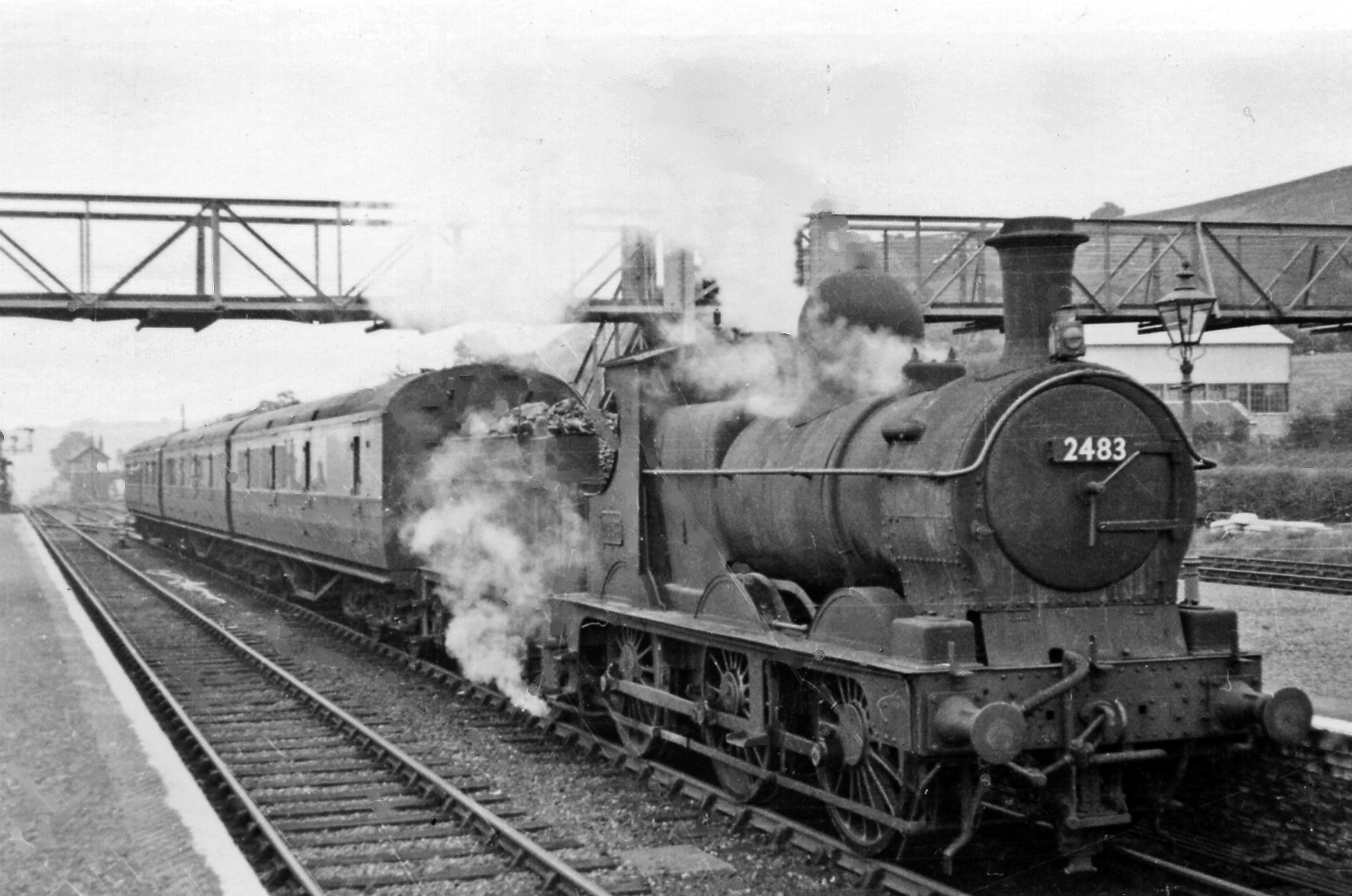
No. 2483 at Llanidloes station 1949

Fifty-four locomotives passed to British Railways in 1948, mostly being used on Welsh branch lines due to their light axle loads. They were progressively replaced by new BR Standard Class 2 2-6-0 engines, and no 2538 was the last to be withdrawn in May 1957.

== Preservation ==
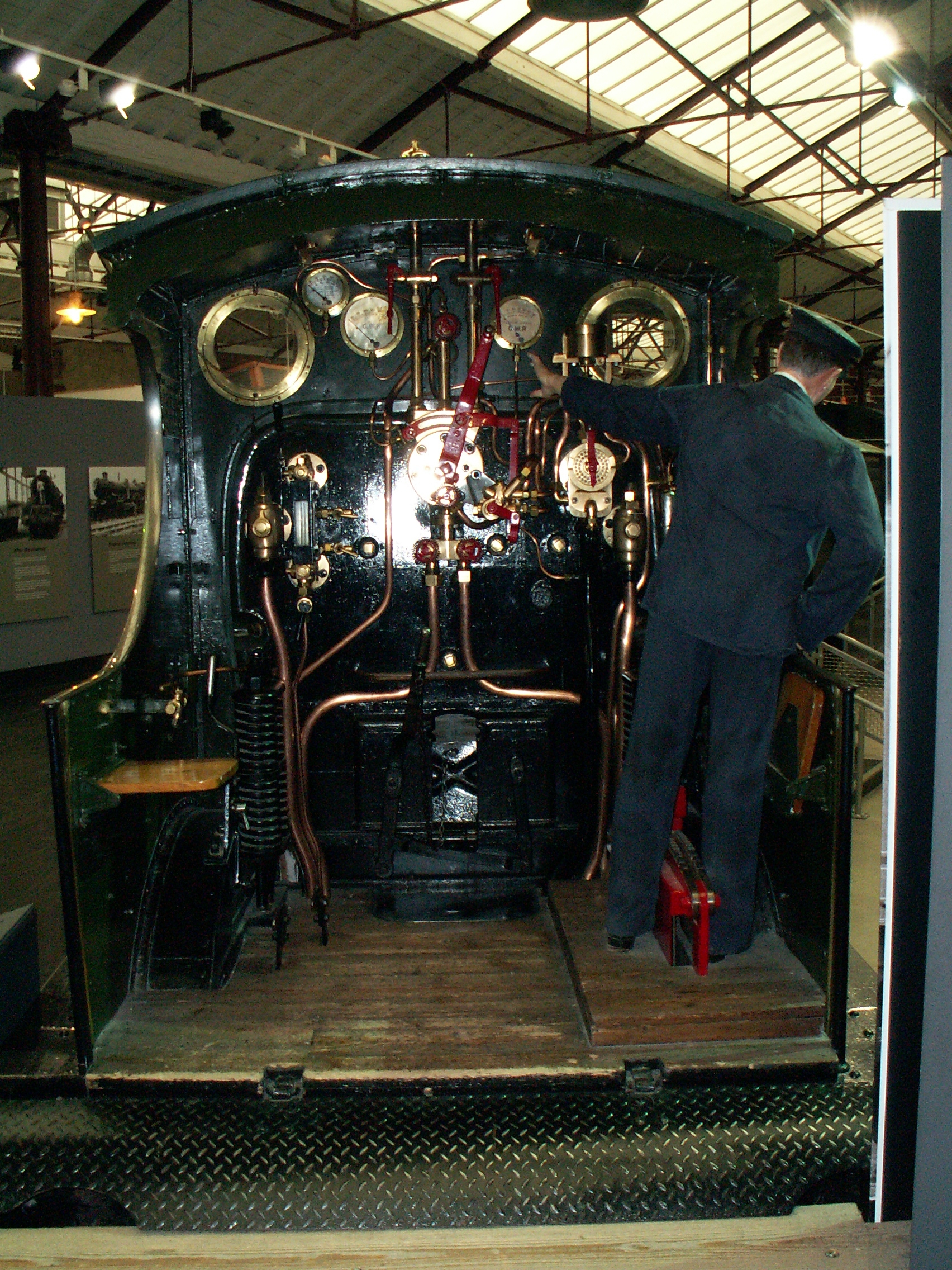
The backhead of preserved 2516

One locomotive, no. 2516 (built 1897), has survived into preservation. 2516 is currently a static exhibit at Swindon Steam Railway Museum, with the tender displayed far behind; visitors consequently have a clear view into the driving cab (see pictures).

In 2026 it was announced that a group called "The 2513 Dean Goods Locomotive Project" intend to build a working replica of a GWR 2301 Dean Goods. The locomotive chosen being classmate 2513.

== Models ==
Three companies have released models of the Dean Goods class:

Oxford Rail in 2017 in Great Western (no 2309, 2475, & 2534), RoD Khaki (no 2308 & 2330) British Railways Black (no 2409) liveries. and War Department (101)

Mainline Model Railways made a Dean Goods class in GWR Green (no 2516) and BR black (no 2538) in 1983.

Hornby Model Railways have released R2064/A/B/C (nos 2468, 2322, 2526, 2579), R2210 (no 2579) and R2275/A (nos 2322 & 2538)

== Sources ==
- Allcock, N. J.; Davies, F. K.; le Fleming, H. M.; Maskelyne, J. N.; Reed, P. J. T.; Tabor, F. J. (1968) [1951]. White, D. E. (ed.). The Locomotives of the Great Western Railway, part one: Preliminary Survey. Kenilworth: RCTS.
- Haresnape, Brian (1976). Churchward locomotives : a pictorial history. London: I. Allan. ISBN 0711006970.
- Hütter, Ingo (2012). Die Dampflokomotiven der Baureihen 50 bis 53 der DRG, DRB, DB, und DR (in German). Werl: DGEG Medien. ISBN 978-3-937189-63-5.
- Tabor, F.J. (February 1956). White, D.E. (ed.). The Locomotives of the Great Western Railway, part four: Six-wheeled Tender Engines. Kenilworth: RCTS.
- Sterndale, A.C.; Parker, L.T.; Smith, C.; Reed, P.J.T.; Tabor, F.J.; Davies, F.K.; Allcock, N.J.; Lucking, J.H. (May 1974). White, D.E. (ed.). The Locomotives of the Great Western Railway, part twelve: A Chronological and Statistical Survey. Kenilworth: RCTS.
- Davies, F.K.; White, D.E. (December 1983). White, D.E. (ed.). The Locomotives of the Great Western Railway, part thirteen: Preservation and Supplementary Information. RCTS. ISBN 0-901115-60-6.
- Davies, Ken (April 1993). The Locomotives of the Great Western Railway, part fourteen: Names and their Origins - Railmotor Services - War Service - The Complete Preservation Story. Lincoln: RCTS. ISBN 0-901115-75-4.
- Allan, Ian (2000) [February 1950]. Allan, Ian (ed.). British Railway Locomotives 1948-1950. Ian Allan Ltd. ISBN 07110-0401-3.
- Pigott, Nick (2 July 2014). "The Engines that won the War". The Railway Magazine. Vol. 160, no. 1, 360. Horncastle, Lincs, UK: Mortons Media. ISSN 0033-8923.
