= GWR River Class =

Class of British steam locomotives

GWR 69 River class
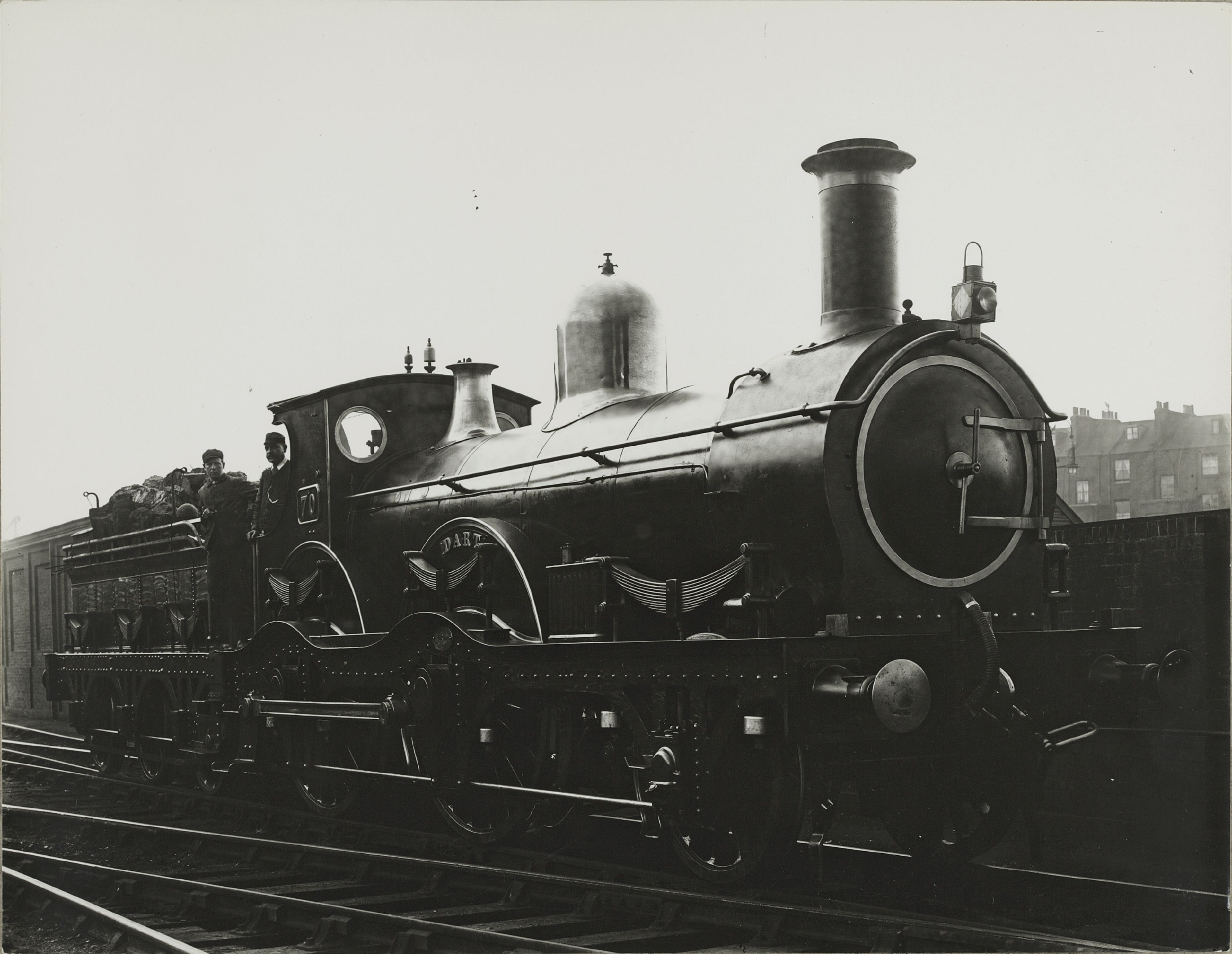
- No. 70 Dart
Type and origin
- Power type: Steam
- Designer: William Dean
- Builder: Swindon Works
- Order number: 103
- Serial number: (none)
- Build date: 1895–1897
- Total produced: 8
Specifications
- Configuration
  - Whyte: 2-4-0
  - UIC: 1B n2
- Gauge: 4 ft 8 1/2 in (1,435 mm)
- Driver dia.: 6 ft 8 in (2.032 m)
- Cylinders: Two
- Cylinder size: 17 in × 24 in (432 mm × 610 mm)
Career
- Operators: Great Western Railway
- Numbers: 69–76
- Restored: 1918
- Disposition: All Scrapped

The 69 Class designed by William Dean for the Great Western Railway consisted of eight 2-4-0 tender locomotives, constructed at Swindon Works between 1895 and 1897. Nominally they were renewals of eight 2-2-2 engines that carried the same numbers, these themselves having been renewals by George Armstrong at Wolverhampton of 2-2-2s designed by Daniel Gooch as long ago as 1855.

In truth the Dean engines were in effect new engines, the only re-used parts being some recently fitted boilers of Swindon pattern. They had 6 ft 8 in (2.032 m) driving wheels and 17 in × 24 in (432 mm × 610 mm) cylinders. 2-4-0s, being mixed-traffic engines, were not usually named on the GWR, but all of the 69s did carry names, as follows:

- 69 Avon
- 70 Dart
- 71 Dee
- 72 Exe
- 73 Isis
- 74 Stour
- 75 Teign
- 76 Wye

The "Rivers" were originally allocated to Oxford, and later moved to the Bristol division. They were not long-lived as 2-4-0s, the last being withdrawn in 1918.
