= GWR 439 Class =

Class of British steam locomotives

Type and origin
- Power type: Steam
- Designer: Joseph Armstrong
- Builder: GWR Swindon works
- Order number: 14th Lot
- Serial number: 129 – 134
- Build date: 1868
- Total produced: 6
Specifications
- Configuration
  - Whyte: 2-4-0
- Gauge: 4 ft 8 1/2 in (1,435 mm) standard gauge
- Driver dia.: 6 ft 1 in (1.854 m)
- Fuel type: Coal
- Cylinders: two
- Cylinder size: (?)
Career
- Operators: Great Western Railway
- Disposition: All scrapped

The GWR 439 Class, nicknamed the Bicycle Class because of its unusual appearance, was a series of six 2-4-0 mixed-traffic engines designed by Joseph Armstrong for the Great Western Railway, and built at Swindon Works in 1868. The "Bicycles" worked at Northern Division sheds, running between Wolverhampton and Chester.

== Design ==
Numbered in the series 439–444, the running plate of these inside-framed locomotives was raised, without splashers, above each of the large (6 ft 1 in or 1.854 m) driving wheels, rather giving the impression of bicycle wheels and mudguards.

== Rebuilding ==
Most of the class was renewed at Wolverhampton railway works under George Armstrong in 1885 and 1886; the renewals were more conventional in appearance, with large splashers, but the class's nickname stuck. At first the renewals also ran on the same routes as their predecessors, though later some were transferred further south.

== Sources ==
- Allcock, N. J.; Davies, F. K.; le Fleming, H. M.; Maskelyne, J. N.; Reed, P. J. T.; Tabor, F. J. White, D. E. (ed.). The Locomotives of the Great Western Railway, part one: Preliminary Survey. Kenilworth: RCTS.
- Tabor, F. J. (February 1956). White, D. E. (ed.). The Locomotives of the Great Western Railway, part four: Six-wheeled Tender Engines. Kenilworth: RCTS.
