= GWR Hurricane locomotive =

Prototype British steam locomotive

GWR Hurricane
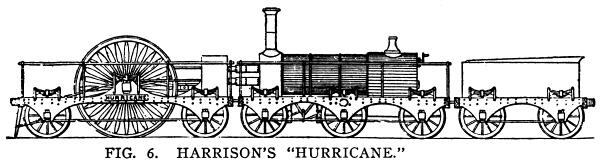
Type and origin
- Power type: Steam
- Designer: T. E. Harrison
- Builder: R. & W. Hawthorn & Co.
- Serial number: 236
- Build date: 1838
- Total produced: 1
Specifications
- Configuration
  - Whyte: 2-2-2+6
- Gauge: 7 ft 1/4 in (2,140 mm)
- Leading dia.: 4 feet 6 inches (1,372 mm)
- Driver dia.: 10 feet 0 inches (3,048 mm)
- Trailing dia.: 4 feet 6 inches (1,372 mm)
- Wheelbase: 15 feet 9 inches (4.80 m)
- Cylinder size: 16 in × 20 in (406 mm × 508 mm)
Career
- Operators: Great Western Railway
- Number in class: 1
- Withdrawn: 1839
- Disposition: Scrapped

Hurricane was the second of a pair of steam locomotives (the other being Thunderer) built for the Great Western Railway (GWR) by R. & W. Hawthorn & Co. whose design was very different from other locomotives. In order to meet Isambard Kingdom Brunel's strict specifications, a 2-2-2 frame carried the 'engine', while the boiler was on a separate six-wheeled frame.

The locomotive was delivered to the GWR on 6 October 1838 and ceased work in December 1839 after running for just 10,527 mi (16,942 km). After withdrawal the boiler was used on a new Pyracmon Class goods locomotive, Bacchus.

== See also ==
- GWR Haigh Foundry locomotives, further geared locomotives
