= GWR 322 Class (tank engine) =

Class of British steam locomotives

Type and origin
- Power type: Steam
- Designer: George Armstrong
- Builder: GWR Wolverhampton works
- Build date: 1878–1885
- Total produced: 6
Specifications
- Configuration
  - Whyte: 0-6-0ST
- Gauge: 4 ft 8 1/2 in (1,435 mm) standard gauge
- Fuel type: Coal
- Cylinders: two
Career
- Operators: GWR
- Retired: 1921
- Disposition: all scrapped

The GWR 322 Class tank engines comprised six Great Western Railway outside-framed 0-6-0 steam locomotives, originally built by Beyer, Peacock, and Company as 322 class tender engines and subsequently rebuilt in 1878–85 as saddle tank locomotives by George Armstrong at Wolverhampton Works.

== Numbering ==
They were numbered in sequence as 322–327, with No. 323 having exchanged numbers with No. 359, No. 325 with No.337 and No. 327 with No. 366.

== Rebuilding ==
From 1918, all apart from No. 324 became pannier tanks when they were reboilered with Belpaire fireboxes. No. 322 was the only one ever to have a fully enclosed cab.

== Use ==
They were principally stationed in the Birmingham/Wolverhampton area and at Stourbridge, and including their previous existence as tender engines, all ran over a million miles up to their withdrawal between 1921 and 1932.
