= GWR 3201 Class =

Class of British steam locomotives

Type and origin
- Power type: Steam
- Designer: William Dean
- Builder: GWR Swindon Works
- Order number: Lot 65
- Serial number: 1026–1030 (new)
- Build date: 1884–1885
- Total produced: 5 (new)
- Number rebuilt: 20 from Lot 64
Specifications
- Configuration
  - Whyte: 2-4-0
- Gauge: 4 ft 8 1/2 in (1,435 mm) standard gauge
- Driver dia.: 5 ft 1 in (1.549 m)
- Fuel type: Coal
- Cylinders: Two, inside
- Cylinder size: 17 in × 26 in (432 mm × 660 mm)

The 3201 or Stella Class was a class of standard gauge 2-4-0 steam locomotive, designed by William Dean and built at Swindon Works for the Great Western Railway in 1884 and 1885.

== Design ==
They were part of a standardisation scheme of Dean's, whereby he designed four classes with similar boilers, double frames, and cylinders, but of different wheel layouts. The 3201 class was close in design to the 3501 Class, ten of which were built initially as 2-4-0T "convertibles" for the broad gauge, and numbers 3511 to 3520 built as standard gauge condensing 2-4-0Ts.

== Construction ==
Initially there were 5 members of the class. The prototype, No.3201, built in December 1884, was immediately sold to the Pembroke and Tenby Railway, who named it Stella. It returned to the GWR in 1896 and retained the nameplates until 1902. Nos. 3202-3205 were constructed in the summer of 1885. Between 1892 and 1895 the class was enlarged to 25 locomotives, as the 7 ft 1/4 in (2,140 mm) broad and standard gauge 2-4-0Ts were all eventually converted to standard gauge tender locomotives. Tabor notes that "... the uniformity was very short-lived, as the class soon acquired a remarkable variety of boilers."

== Use ==
The original Stellas worked in the Bristol division but after the gauge conversion of 1892 all 25 locos were dispatched to Cornwall, where they worked the principal trains west of Newton Abbot until the arrival a few years later of the 3252 or Duke Class. The class then became widely dispersed; by 1915 many were at Chester or Croes Newydd, others at Birmingham or Stourbridge. Later some went to central Wales. Withdrawals took place between 1919 and 1933.
