= GWR 388 class =

Class of British steam locomotives

Armstrong Goods
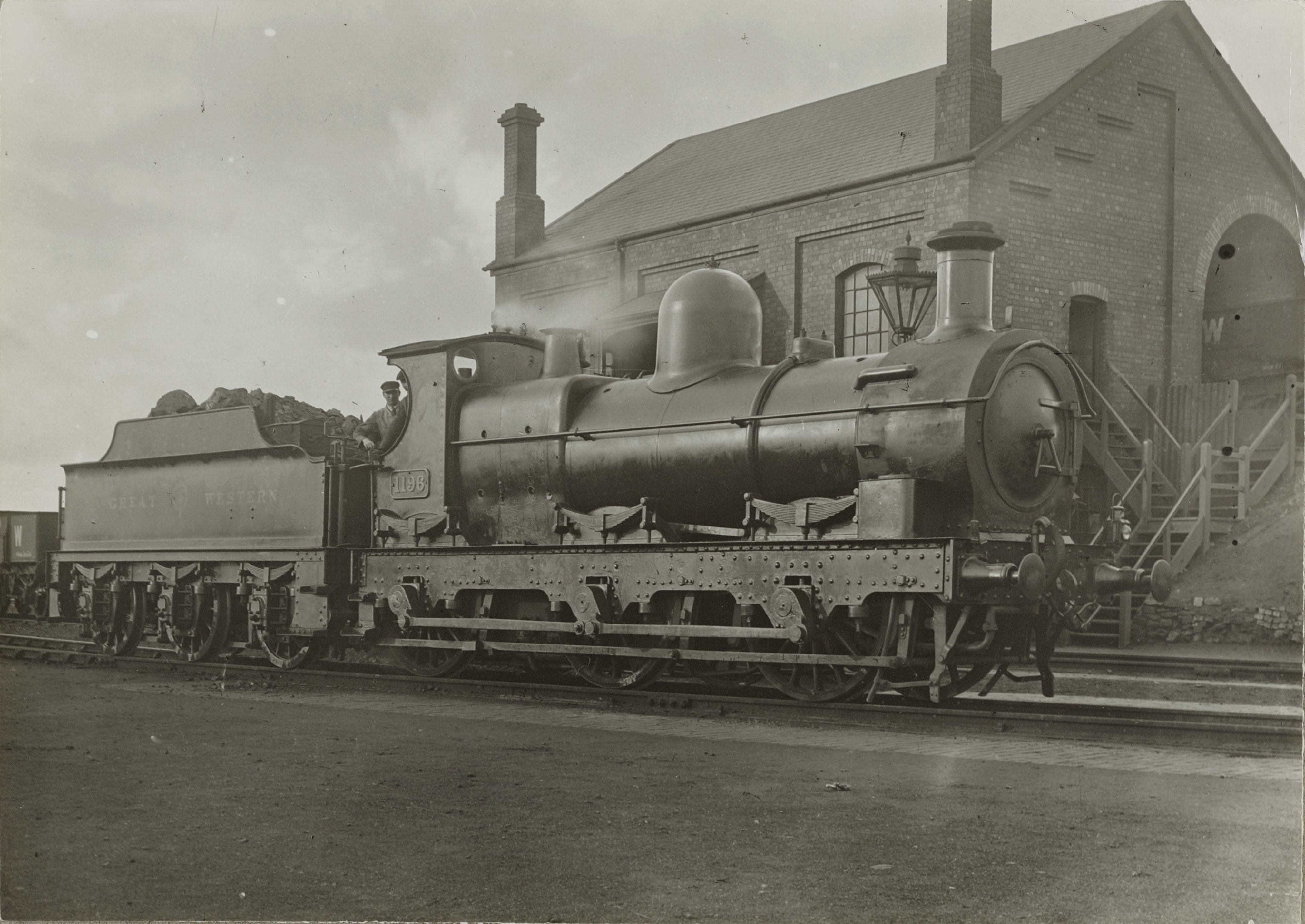
Type and origin
- Power type: Steam
- Designer: Joseph Armstrong
- Builder: GWR Swindon Works
- Order number: Lots 9th Goods, 10th Goods, 1st Renewals, 11th Goods, 15, 16, 17, 21, 23, 24, 26, 28, 31, 35, 41, 42
- Serial number: 79–128, 135–154, 215–144, 251–300, 321–350, 352–391, 432–461, 483–502, 623–662
- Build date: 1866–1876
Specifications
- Configuration
  - Whyte: 0-6-0
  - UIC: C n2
- Gauge: 4 ft 8 1/2 in (1,435 mm) standard gauge and 7 ft 1/4 in (2,140 mm)
- Driver dia.: 5 ft 0 in (1,524 mm)
- Wheelbase: 15 ft 8 in (4.78 m)
- Boiler: GWR Standard Goods
- Cylinder size: 17 in × 24 in (432 mm × 610 mm) dia × stroke
Career
- Operators: Great Western Railway
- Class: 388 Class

The GWR 388 class was a large class of 310 0-6-0 goods locomotives built by the Great Western Railway. They are sometimes referred to as the Armstrong Goods or Armstrong Standard Goods to differentiate from the Gooch Goods and Dean Goods classes, both of which were also large classes of standard goods locomotives.

== Use ==
Despite their description as goods engines, for many years they were also used on passenger trains; the class that principally replaced them was Churchward's mixed-traffic 2-6-0s, the 4300 Class of 1919–21. They were used throughout the GWR system where the gauge permitted; principally in the Northern Division to start with.

== War service ==
While the service overseas of Dean's 2301 Class during two world wars is well documented, that of the 388 Class in World War I is less known. Six of the class were sent to Serbia in 1916, two of them returning in 1921; and 16 of them were shipped to Salonika in 1917, though the first batch of eight was lost at sea. After the war four of them entered the stock of the Ottoman Railway Company; another four were returned to the GWR in 1921.

== Numbering ==
The 388 class were built in several batches between 1866 and 1876; many locomotives were given numbers from recently withdrawn locomotives, so they do not run in a continuous series, or even in order of construction.

In the following table the "Works Number" is a sequential number allocated by the builder, the "Locomotive number" is the number carried on the locomotive for identification.

Table of orders and numbers
Year	Quantity	Lot No.	Works Nos.	Locomotive numbers	Notes
1866-67	19	9th Goods	79–97	388–406	
1867	16	10th Goods	98–113	407–412, 419–428	
1867	5	1st Renewals	114–118	1012–1014, 1064–1065	1064/65 renumbered 1088/98 in September 1868; then 238 and 37 in July 1870
1867	10	11th Goods	119–128	429–438	
1868	10	15th	135–144	445–454	
1868	5	16th	145–149	370–371, 426–428	426–429 renumbered 26, 42, 1066 in February 1868; 1066 renumbered 1090 in September 1868; then 38 in July 1870.
1868	5	17th	150–154	1091–1095	renumbered 41, 43, 44, 46, 50 in July 1870
1870	30	21st	215–244	491–496, 1168, 498–500, 1169–1171, 497, 501–516	1168–1171 renumbered 1082–85 in July 1870.
1870	30	23rd	251–280	1086–1099, 1100–1105, 593–602	
1870-71	20	24th	281–300	1106–1115, 603–612	
1871-72	30	26th	321–350	657–676, 24, 31, 48, 51, 52, 116, 298, 300, 415, 416	
1872	40	28th	252–391	677–716	
1873	30	31st	432–461	776–805	
1873-74	20	35th	483–502	874–893	
1875-76	20	41st	623–642	21–23, 25, 27, 29, 32, 39, 53, 117, 1186–1195	
1876	20	42nd	643–662	1196–1215	Ran as broad-gauge locomotives from 1884 or 1887–88 until 1892, see later

== Broad gauge ==
Twenty locomotives were converted to 7 ft 1/4 in (2,140 mm) broad gauge from 1884 and reconverted to standard gauge in 1892.

- 1196 (1888–1892)
- 1197 (1887–1892)
- 1198 (1888–1892)
- 1199 (1887–1892)
- 1200 (1887–1892)
- 1201 (1888–1892)
- 1202 (1887–1892)
- 1203 (1887–1892)
- 1204 (1888–1892)
- 1205 (1888–1892)
- 1206 (1884–1892)
- 1207 (1884–1892)
- 1208 (1884–1892)
- 1209 (1884–1892)
- 1210 (1884–1892)
- 1211 (1884–1892)
- 1212 (1884–1892)
- 1213 (1884–1892)
- 1214 (1884–1892)
- 1215 (1884–1892)

Conversion to broad gauge involved the replacement of the locomotive axles, the wheels being placed outside the outer frames instead of between the inner and outer frames. Secondhand tenders which had been built for the broad gauge were used; these were wider than the locomotive cabs, which were not altered.

== Accidents and incidents ==
On 11 November 1890, No. 1100 was struck by a broad gauge boat train from Plymouth at Norton Fitzwarren.

== Withdrawal ==
There were numerous withdrawals from around 1920. After 1930 the few remainders were at Oxley, Stourbridge and Wellington, and the last was withdrawn in 1934. Like all Armstrong locomotives, none were preserved.
