= Buckley Wells tram stop =

Buckley Wells

General information
- Location: Bury, Bury; England
- Coordinates: 53.5876°N 2.3015°W
- System: Metrolink station
Location

Buckley Wells is a proposed tram stop on the Bury Line of Greater Manchester's Metrolink light rail system. It is to be between Bury Interchange and Radcliffe Metrolink station, in the Buckley Wells area of Bury, north of Fishpool and south of Bury town centre.

The proposed site of Buckley Wells stop, by the A56 road, is owned by Transport for Greater Manchester, was proposed in 2003, offering (in addition to the Metrolink stop and services for southern Bury) a park and ride facility, and opportunity to provide an interchange with the East Lancashire Railway.

Preceding station	Manchester Metrolink	Following station
	Proposed	
Radcliffe	Bury Line	Bury
