= GWR 378 Class =

Class of British steam locomotives

GWR 378 Class 2-2-2
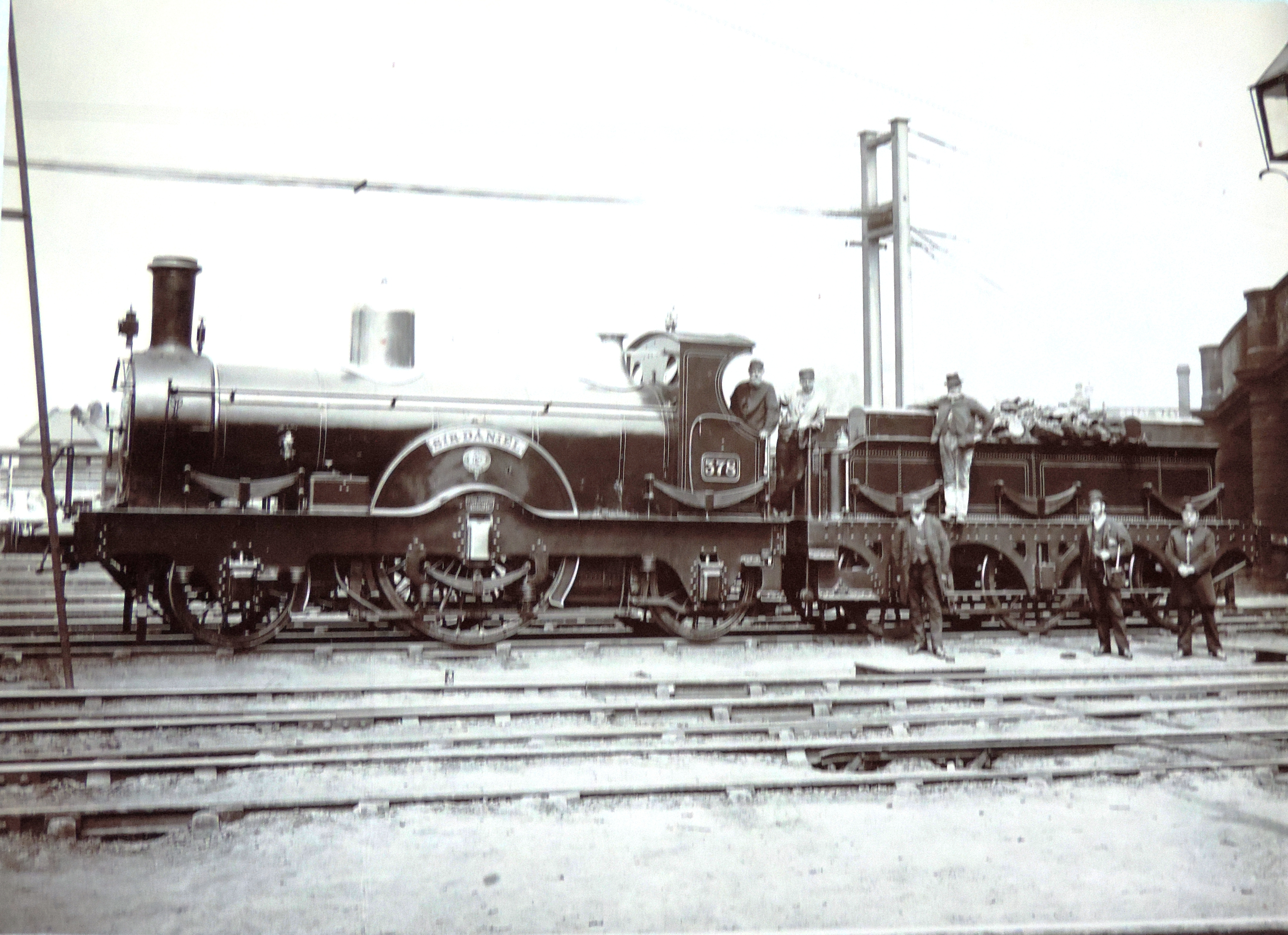
- Sir Daniel Class No. 378 as built
Type and origin
- Power type: Steam
- Designer: Joseph Armstrong
- Builder: GWR, Swindon Works
- Order number: 1st Lot Pass; Lot 19
- Serial number: 69–78; 175–194
- Build date: 1866; 1869
- Total produced: 30
Specifications
- Configuration
  - Whyte: 2-2-2
  - UIC: 1'A1'
- Gauge: 4 ft 8 1/2 in (1,435 mm) standard gauge
- Leading dia.: 4 ft 0 in (1,219 mm)
- Driver dia.: 7 ft 0 in (2,134 mm)
- Trailing dia.: 4 ft 0 in (1,219 mm)
- Wheelbase: 16 ft 0 in (4,877 mm)
- Adhesive weight: 13 long tons 1 cwt (29,200 lb or 13.3 t) (13.3 t; 14.6 short tons)
- Loco weight: 29 long tons 13 cwt (66,400 lb or 30.1 t) (30.1 t; 33.2 short tons)
- Fuel type: Coal
- Firebox
  - Grate area: 16.6 sq ft (1.54 m^{2})
- Boiler: GWR Sir Daniel; GWR Standard Goods
- Boiler pressure: 140 psi (970 kPa)
- Heating surface: 1,203 sq ft (111.8 m^{2})
- Cylinders: Two, inside
- Cylinder size: 17 in × 24 in (432 mm × 610 mm)
Performance figures
- Tractive effort: 9,624 lbf (42.81 kN)
Career
- Operators: Great Western Railway
- Number in class: 30
- Numbers: 378–387; 471–480; 577–586
- Official name: 378 Class
- Nicknames: Sir Daniel
- Withdrawn: 1898–1904
- Disposition: 7 scrapped; 23 rebuilt as 0-6-0

The GWR 378 Class (also known as the Sir Daniel Class) was a class of 30 standard-gauge 2-2-2 steam locomotives on the Great Western Railway in Britain. They were introduced in 1866, and the class remained intact until 1898. Several were altered to the 0-6-0 wheel arrangement, and the last was withdrawn from service in 1920.

== History ==
Joseph Armstrong designed a class of 2-2-2 standard-gauge passenger locomotives, ten of which were built in 1866 at the Swindon Works of the Great Western Railway (GWR). They were the first standard-gauge passenger tender locomotives to be built at Swindon. In 1869, a further 20 were built, also at Swindon, which differed little from the first 10, although the safety-valve covers were of different shape.

The locomotives were built as follows:

Dates built	Swindon order (Note: Originally, Swindon ran separate series of lot numbers for different categories of engines. From 1868, a single series was used for standard gauge locos, beginning at "14th Lot")	Works nos.	Quantity	GWR numbers
September–October 1866	1st Lot Passenger	69–78	10	378–387
June 1869	19th Lot	175–177	3	471–473
June–August 1869	19th Lot	178–187	10	1112–1121 (later 577–586)
August–September 1869	19th Lot	188–194	7	474–480

Ten locomotives were numbered 1112–21 when new, in a separate series designated for engines paid for out of receipts as opposed to capital. They were renumbered into the capital list as 577–586 in July or August 1870, when a similar quantity of old 7 ft 1/4 in (2,140 mm) broad-gauge engines were taken out of service.

Two of the 378 class were named when new. No. 378 (built 1866) was named Sir Daniel in honour of Sir Daniel Gooch, who had resigned from the GWR in 1864; as a result, the class was sometimes known as the Sir Daniel class. No. 471 (built 1869) was named Sir Watkin, after Sir Watkin Williams-Wynn; the name was taken from a broad-gauge locomotive of the Sir Watkin class, and the latter locomotive may have received the name Wynn in replacement. The name was removed from no. 471 when it was rebuilt as an 0-6-0 in 1901, but no. 378 retained its name until it was withdrawn in 1898.

Two more were named later on. Nos. 380 and 381 received the names North Star and Morning Star respectively, these being the names of the two oldest members of the broad-gauge Star class, which were withdrawn in 1871 and 1869 respectively. Both 380 and 381 lost their names c. 1897.

The Sir Daniels worked expresses from London to Wolverhampton, to Worcester, and northwards, later also working into Somerset, south Wales and elsewhere as the standard gauge spread. As late as 1893 Charles Rous-Marten noted a fine run with one of the class on a principal Cornish express between Exeter and Bristol.

Three of the locomotives – nos. 378, 383 & 479 – were scrapped between 1898 and 1900, but William Dean then began rebuilding the remainder as 0-6-0 goods engines. In 1902, after 23 had been so treated, G.J. Churchward (Dean's successor) decided that no more rebuilding would be carried out, and so nos. 382/6, 478 & 579 were scrapped unaltered in 1903 and 1904.

== 0-6-0 rebuilds ==
GWR 378 Class 0-6-0 (Note: Only changed dimensions shown)
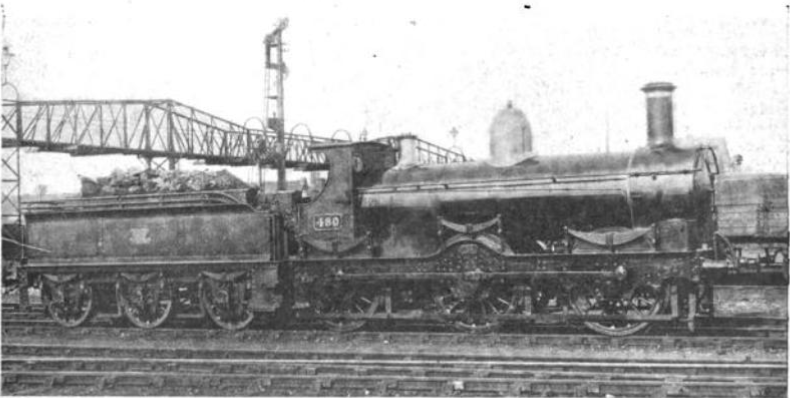
- GWR No. 480 as rebuilt
Type and origin
- Designer: William Dean
- Rebuilder: GWR, Swindon Works
- Rebuild date: 1900–02
- Number rebuilt: 23
Specifications
- Configuration
  - Whyte: 0-6-0
- Driver dia.: 5 ft 2 in (1,575 mm)
- Axle load: 15 long tons 2 cwt (33,800 lb or 15.3 t) (15.3 t; 16.9 short tons)
- Loco weight: 34 long tons 5 cwt (76,700 lb or 34.8 t) (34.8 t; 38.4 short tons)
- Water cap.: 3,000 imp gal (14,000 L)
Performance figures
- Tractive effort: 14,263 lbf (63.44 kN)
Career
- Power class: Ungrouped
- Axle load class: Uncoloured
- Withdrawn: 1903–20
- Disposition: All scrapped

Between 1900 and 1902, 23 of the Sir Daniel 2-2-2s were rebuilt as 0-6-0s to a design by William Dean. Apart from the provision of new wheels of 5 ft 2 in (1.575 m) diameter, the only alterations necessary were to the frames.

The 0-6-0 locomotives were withdrawn between 1903 and 1920, the last two (nos. 381 & 474) lasting long enough to be placed in the "ungrouped" power classification and "uncoloured" weight classification in 1919.
