= GWR 3501 class =

Class of British steam locomotives

3501 Class
Type and origin
- Power type: Steam
- Designer: William Dean
- Builder: Great Western Railway
- Order number: Lot 64
- Serial number: 1006–1015
- Build date: 1885
- Total produced: 10
- Rebuild date: 1890–1891
- Number rebuilt: 5
Specifications
- Configuration
  - Whyte: 2-4-0T (as built); 2-4-0 (after rebuild)
- Gauge: 7 ft 1/4 in (2,140 mm)
- Leading dia.: 3 ft 6 in (1,067 mm)
- Driver dia.: 5 ft 1 in (1,549 mm)
- Wheelbase: 17 ft 0 in (5.18 m)
- Cylinder size: 17 in × 26 in (432 mm × 660 mm)
Career
- Operators: Great Western Railway
- Class: 3501 Class
- Number in class: 10
- Withdrawn: 1892
- Disposition: All converted to 3201 Class

The GWR 3501 Class were ten broad gauge 2-4-0 locomotives built by the Great Western Railway.

They were built in 1885 as 2-4-0T locomotives, but five were rebuilt in 1890 as 2-4-0 tender locomotives for working express trains between Exeter and Plymouth. They comprised the first ten locomotives of Lot 64, the remainder of which comprised ten similar locomotive Nos. 3511 to 3520 built to the standard gauge. In 1892 the broad gauge was abandoned and the locomotives were all converted to standard gauge tender locomotives, becoming a part of the 3201 Class.

== 2-4-0T locomotives ==
- 3501 (1885 - 1890)
- 3502 (1885 - 1890)
- 3503 (1885 - 1892)
- 3504 (1885 - 1892)
- 3505 (1885 - 1890)
- 3506 (1885 - 1892)
- 3507 (1885 - 1891)
- 3508 (1885 - 1890)
- 3509 (1885 - 1892)
- 3510 (1885 - 1892)

== 2-4-0 locomotives ==
- 3501 (1890 - 1892)
- 3502 (1890 - 1892)
- 3505 (1890 - 1892)
- 3507 (1891 - 1892)
- 3508 (1890 - 1892)
