= R and W Hawthorn =

English locomotive manufacturer

R and W Hawthorn Ltd was a locomotive manufacturer in Newcastle upon Tyne, England, from 1817 until 1885.

== Locomotive building ==
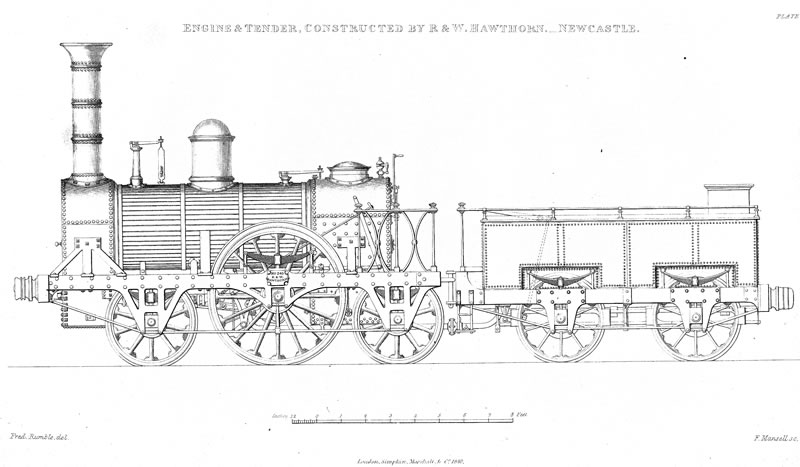
R&W Hawthorn 2-2-2 engine and tender

Robert Hawthorn first began business at Forth Bank Works in 1817, building marine and stationary steam engines. In 1820, his brother William joined him and the firm became R and W Hawthorn. Possibly after having attended the Rainhill Trials in 1829, they became interested in locomotives, and sold their first engine in 1831. Printed and online sources claim this to be Mödling for the Vienna Gloggnitz railway. That is wrong, that locomotive was delivered in 1841. The 1831 order was placed by the Stockton and Darlington Railway.

In 1838 two (Thunderer and Hurricane) were built for the broad gauge Great Western Railway to the patent of T. E. Harrison, who later became the chief engineer for the North Eastern Railway. These could be viewed as the forerunners of the Garratt locomotive, with the boiler carried on a separate carriage to the cylinders and valvegear. This allowed the boiler to be large and low down, being carried on smaller wheels, while the driving wheels could be up to ten feet (120 in; 3,048 mm) in diameter. With little weight on the drivers, adhesion was poor, but they ran very smoothly up to sixty miles per hour (97 km/h). However, the flexible steam coupling gave a great deal of trouble and they were withdrawn.

They continued to build more conventional engines, possibly under sub-contract, among them, three for the Birmingham and Derby Junction Railway. In 1850 the company built their first tank locomotive which was supplied to the York, Newcastle and Berwick Railway In the 1850s, they also built six 4-4-0ST, Crampton locomotives of the Sondes class for the East Kent Railway. Also, in the quest for a low centre of gravity, four 0-4-0s with the drivers spaced at twelve feet (144 in; 3,658 mm) apart connected to the cylinders by a dummy crankshaft. These were soon withdrawn, and the Cramptons rebuilt into traditional 2-4-0 tanks,

The year 1858 saw them build they’re ‘most likely’ first Narrow Gauge locomotives, a pair of compact ‘small’ 0-4-0T tank engines for the Neath Abbey Coal Company, these are of unknown classification (possibly manufacturers type designation 94?) but were most likely twins, with a gauge of approx 2’-8” (810 mm), 8x16 outside cyls. and 2’-4” diameter wheels, the first of the batch is recorded as being despatched sometime in August, while the second of the batch was despatched on 31 August 1858, the first, makers number 1045. Was given the name ‘IRON DUKE’, while the second, 1046. Was named ‘PRINCE OF WALES’, it is unknown as of now when but they were s/s at some-point before the Main Colliery Company took over the assets of the NACC in 1889 or just some time after, tho they are also for the majority of the time described as being ‘small locomotives’ in written text.

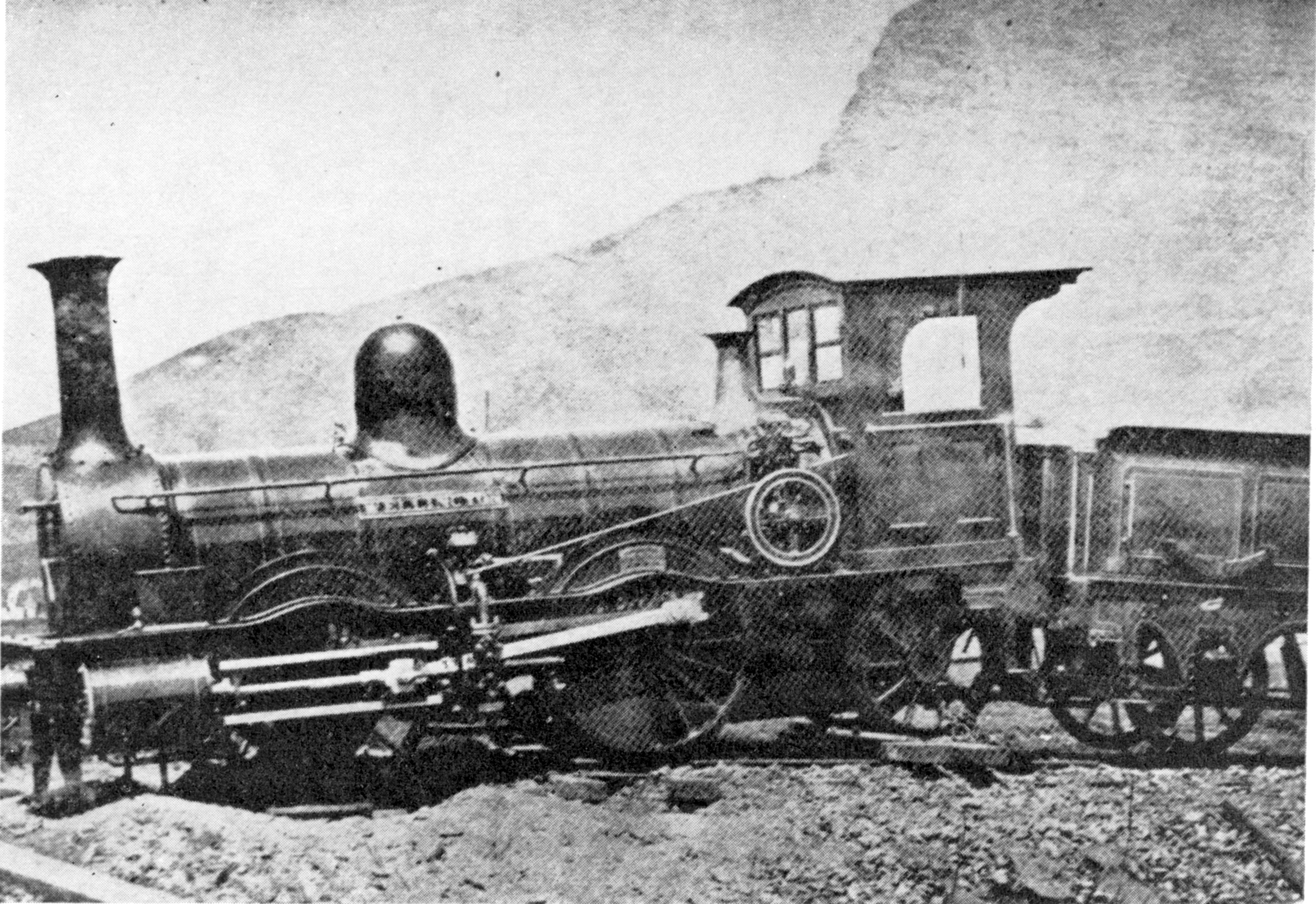
CTR&D No. 4 Wellington, derailed during labour unrest

In 1860, eight tender locomotives with an 0-4-2 wheel arrangement, the first tender locomotives to work in South Africa, were built for the Cape Town Railway and Dock Company.

In 1872, they opened a marine engine building works at St. Peter's in the east end of Newcastle, adjoining that of Robert Stephenson and Company and in 1880 amalgamated with the shipbuilder A. Leslie and Company, to become Hawthorn Leslie and Company.

== Hawthorns and Company, Leith ==
In 1846, they bought the Leith Engine Works, in Leith, Scotland, for the assembly of locomotives prepared in Newcastle. These works were sold to another company also called Hawthorns and Company, which produced some four hundred locomotives on its own account until 1872.

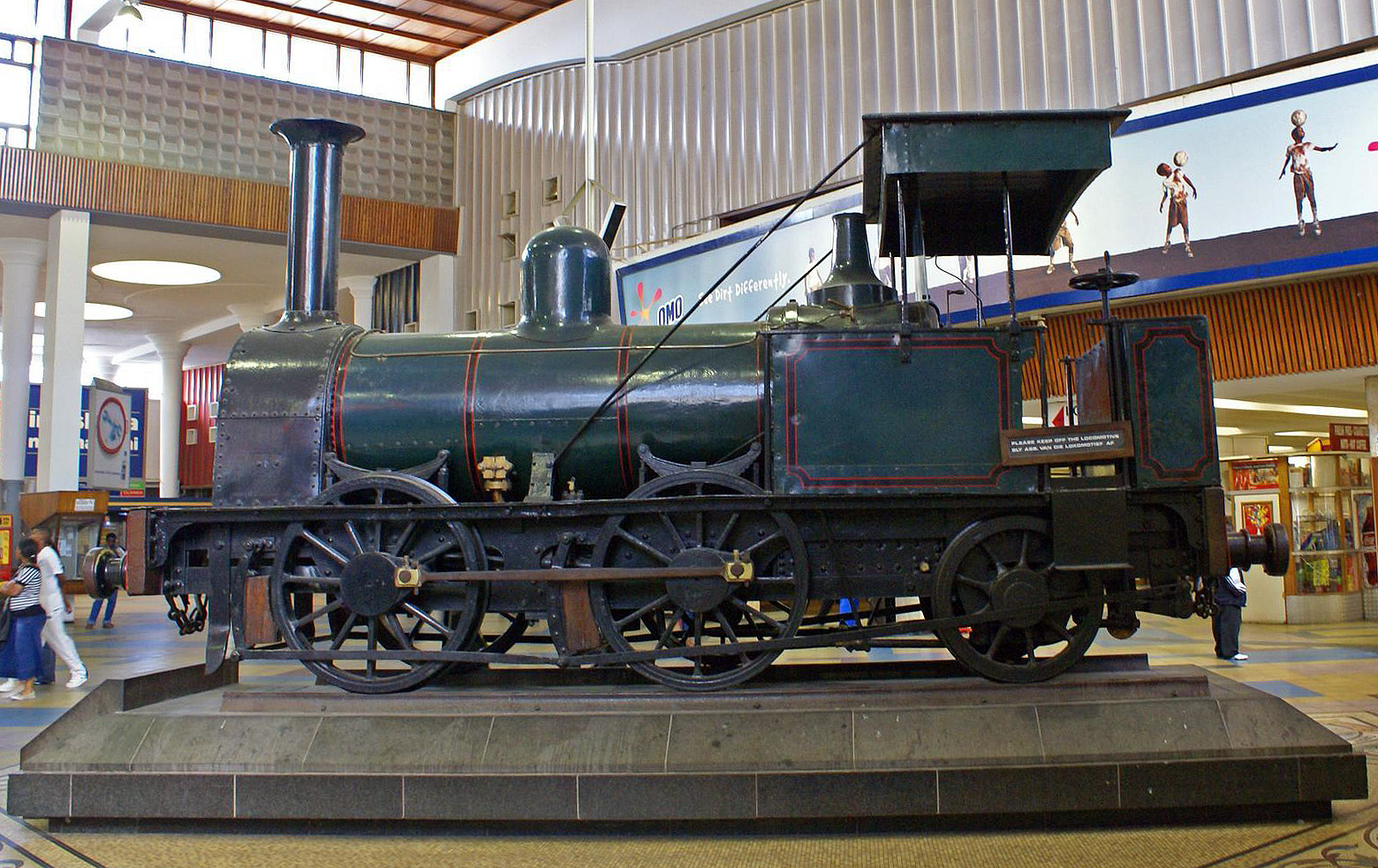
1859 Pickerings locomotive plinthed at Cape Town station

In 1859, Hawthorns, Leith, built an 0-4-0T locomotive for Messrs E. & J. Pickering, contractors for the construction of the Cape Town-Wellington Railway in the Cape Colony. This locomotive was the first steam locomotive to run in South Africa. In 1861 the Cape Town-Wellington Railway Company took over all construction, and the locomotive, from Pickerings and the locomotive became the Cape Town-Wellington Railway's no 9, later to become known as "Blackie". It was subsequently rebuilt to a 0-4-2 configuration. In 1936 it was proclaimed a national monument and has since been plinthed in the concourse at Cape Town station.

In 1861, Hawthorns supplied an 0-4-0WT locomotive, works number 244, to the Howe Bridge Colliery in Lancashire. Named Ellesmere, it continued in use at the colliery until 1957, when it was the oldest working steam engine in Britain. It is now preserved in the National Museum of Scotland in Edinburgh.

== Sources ==
- Bradley, D.L. (1979) The locomotive history of the London Chatham and Dover Railway, Railway Correspondence and Travel Society.
- Flowers, Anna; Histon, Vanessa (1999). Water Under the Bridges, Newcastle's Twentieth Century. Newcastle upon Tyne: Tyne Bridge Publishing. ISBN 1-85795-140-9.
- Lowe, J.W., (1989) British Steam Locomotive Builders, Guild Publishing.
- Clarke, J.F., (1977) Power on Land & Sea - a history of R & W Hawthorn Leslie, Hawthorn Leslie (Engineers) Ltd.
