= Joseph Armstrong (engineer) =

English locomotive engineer

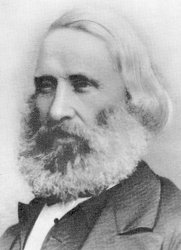
- Born: 21 September 1816; Bewcastle, Cumberland, England
- Died: 5 June 1877 (aged 60); Matlock Bath, Derbyshire, England
- Engineering career
- Discipline: Steam locomotive engineer
- Employer: Great Western Railway

Joseph Armstrong (born Bewcastle, Cumberland, 21 September 1816, died Matlock Bath 5 June 1877) was an English locomotive engineer and the second locomotive superintendent of the Great Western Railway. His younger brother George and one of his sons ("Young Joe") also became outstanding engineers in the employment of the GWR.

== Career ==
=== Early years to 1847 ===
After a spell in Canada, in 1824 Joseph's family took up residence in Newburn-on-Tyne, where his father Thomas became a bailiff to the Duke of Northumberland. Joseph attended Bruce's School in Newcastle, where Robert Stephenson had also been a pupil. In 1823 Robert Stephenson, in collaboration with his father George, had set up his locomotive works in the city. Moreover, Newburn was at one end of the Wylam Waggonway, where the sight of the famous locomotives Puffing Billy and Wylam Dilly must have inspired young Joseph's enthusiasm as an engineer. Newburn also had colliery railways worked by stationary engines, and it was at one of these, Walbottle Colliery, that Armstrong found his first employment.

As well as their acquaintance with the Stephensons, an important contact for the Armstrongs was the Methodist philanthropist Timothy Hackworth, who in 1825 became first locomotive superintendent of the brand-new Stockton and Darlington Railway. Through Hackworth, the teenage Armstrong may have gained experience driving locomotives on the Stockton and Darlington, and it has been suggested that Hackworth was probably a strong influence on his notably humane religious and social outlook when later in a position of great responsibility at Swindon Works on the Great Western.

Meanwhile, continuing to gain hands-on experience with the pioneering steam locomotives of the time, at the age of 20 (1836) Armstrong was employed by Edward Woods as a driver on Stephenson's Liverpool and Manchester Railway, moving four years later to a similar post on the Hull and Selby Railway, where he was promoted to the post of foreman and became acquainted with the forward-looking locomotive designs of John Gray. On following Gray to Brighton Works in 1845, Armstrong also got to know another pioneering locomotive engineer of the period, David Joy.

=== Saltney and Wolverhampton, 1847–64 ===
In 1847 Armstrong was appointed assistant locomotive superintendent to Edward Jeffreys, on the Shrewsbury and Chester Railway (S&CR), whose repair works was at Saltney. When Jeffreys left in April 1853, Armstrong was promoted to Locomotive Superintendent. Also in 1853, the S&CR pooled its locomotives with the Shrewsbury and Birmingham Railway (S&BR), and Armstrong became responsible for the combined fleet, moving to the ex-S&BR repair shops close to Wolverhampton (High Level) station, where he appointed his younger brother, George as his assistant and works manager.

On 1 September 1854, the S&CR and S&BR amalgamated with the Great Western Railway (GWR), whose locomotive workshops were at Swindon. The two smaller railways became the newly established Northern Division of the GWR. Armstrong remained in his position (although he now reported to Daniel Gooch, who was based at Paddington), and a larger works was established at Wolverhampton to replace the former S&BR premises.

The ex-S&CR and ex-S&BR locomotives were the first standard-gauge locomotives to be owned by the GWR. All these had been supplied by independent locomotive manufacturers, but the GWR Board wished to have future standard-gauge locomotives built at Wolverhampton. Since Wolverhampton was not yet equipped for new construction, Swindon began building standard-gauge locomotives in 1855, which were to the designs of Gooch; some of these were built by outside manufacturers. In 1859, Wolverhampton also began building locomotives, to the designs of Armstrong, who had been given a certain degree of autonomy.

=== Swindon, 1864–77 ===
In 1864, Gooch resigned the post of Superintendent of Locomotive Engines, and Armstrong was promoted to replace him; in addition to Gooch's locomotive duties, Armstrong was also made responsible for carriages and wagons, which was reflected in his new job title, that of Locomotive, Carriage and Wagon Superintendent. As with Gooch, his responsibilities encompassed the Northern Division, which he was happy to devolve to his younger brother, George.

Arriving at Swindon, Armstrong embarked his onerous duties with a zeal that would eventually prove too much for even his sturdy health. A characteristic Victorian paterfamilias, he was diligent and strict, intolerant of corruption and injustice, yet philanthropic and generous to those who worked hard. In addition to his railway duties he was much involved in the everyday life of New Swindon. He was a lay preacher for the Methodists, while also ensuring that the town had churches of all denominations. He was president of the Mechanics' Institute, founded by Gooch but much expanded under Armstrong, and from 1864 till his death was Chairman of the Swindon New Town Board. He was involved with the Medical Fund Society, the Sick Fund Society, the town Water Works, and the Cottage Hospital with its associated mutual benefit societies.

The 1860s and 70s were a time of expansion for the Great Western Railway. After the Gauge Commission had decided in 1846 against the expansion of the broad gauge, most new routes were laid to standard gauge only. Armstrong's job included maintaining the large stock of broad gauge locomotives, many of which had to be renewed or replaced, and also (from 1868) designing a large number of new standard gauge locomotives for service on the rapidly increasing amount of standard and mixed gauge track. In a wider sense he was in charge of all the company's rolling stock, as well as the work and well-being of some 13,000 employees all over the GWR network.

In 1877 Joseph started to show signs of heart trouble. He was reluctant to stop work, but eventually agreed to take a convalescent holiday in Scotland. This came too late, however, and he died of a heart attack at Matlock Bath while travelling north. His funeral on 7 June was one of the most memorable in Swindon's history: 2,000 workers came from the Works, and another 100 from Wolverhampton, as well as many from elsewhere on the GWR system. There were outsiders, too, such as William Stroudley from Brighton; in all some 6,000 people crowded into St Mark's churchyard, where an obelisk to the memory of Armstrong and two of his sons can still be seen just to the east of the church.

== Children ==
Joseph married Sarah Burdon in 1848. They had nine children, four of whom were apprenticed at Swindon:

- Thomas Armstrong (1849–1908). On his father's death he left the GWR, subsequently working as a salesman for engineering companies.
- John Armstrong (1851–1931). On Joseph's death he became Assistant Divisional Locomotive Superintendent, under William Dean. From 1882 he was Divisional Locomotive Superintendent of the Paddington Division, where one of his duties was to supervise the running of the royal train. He retired in 1916. His son Ralph (b. 1880) worked for the GWR for some 50 years up to his retirement in 1946, just two years before nationalisation.
- Joseph ("Young Joe") Armstrong (1856–1888). His constitution was not strong and he travelled to South Africa, and later the Mediterranean, for the sake of his health. Together with the young George Jackson Churchward he developed a system of automatic braking system, which was used on the GWR and the Western Region until well after nationalisation. "Young Joe" succeeded his brother John as Dean's assistant, and in 1885 moved to Wolverhampton where he took up a similar post under his uncle, George. Tragically, this 'genius of the family' committed suicide on New Year's Day 1888, apparently with the aim of paying off £500 of debts by means of a life insurance policy. Years later, Churchward would comment generously that had "Young Joe" survived, he, and not Churchward, would have been William Dean's successor.
- Irving Armstrong (1862–1935). After serving his apprenticeship at Swindon, Irving became a minister in the Methodist church.

In 1873 the GWR built a large family house for the Armstrongs, Newburn House, located south-east of Swindon Works and station. Dean and Churchward both subsequently lived there, but the childless Colletts chose to live elsewhere, and Newburn House was demolished in 1937. The present-day Newburn Crescent is on the site.

== Locomotives ==
The locomotives of the Armstrongs are relatively little known today, compared to the epoch-making work of Gooch and the turn-of-century elegance of Dean's best designs. Most Armstrong engines were withdrawn by the time of the Second World War, many long before, and none was preserved. One writer has suggested that there is in fact not a huge amount to say about them, simply because they were so orthodox and consistently well-designed. At the same time, "...it is fair to say that he [Armstrong] left the Great Western better provided with sound engines for every class of traffic than any other railway in Britain, and probably in the world."

All of Joseph's engines were six-wheelers:

- 2-2-2 "singles" for express passenger work, originally some of the "Jenny Lind" type, then most famously the "Queen"/"Sir Alexander" classes (Queen itself was, naturally enough, the GWR royal locomotive) and the slightly smaller "Sir Daniel" class.
- 2-4-0 tender engines for slower passenger trains. There were several classes of these, and they were often rebuilt when they passed through works, whether at Swindon or Wolverhampton - which makes tracing their detailed history a confusing business.
- 0-6-0 tender engines for freight, notably the "Armstrong Standard Goods" or 388 class, of which nearly 300 were built, 20 of them as "convertibles" for the broad gauge. 20 others were built with smaller wheels, for the South Wales coal traffic. The outside-frame version of the long-lived "Dean Goods" 0-6-0s, the 2361 class, was essentially a development of the 388 class.
- 2-4-0 tank engines for suburban passenger work, principally the "Metro Tank" or 455 class first built in 1868; used all over the system, but most known for hauling London suburban trains, which they did for about half a century. Construction continued under William Dean, and some had condensing gear for working over the Metropolitan Railway. Gibson recalled experiencing lively, punctual runs between Maidenhead and Paddington with this surprisingly powerful class, as late as c.1930. O. S. Nock, referring to the same period, suggests that the running of the "Metros" anticipated modern, electric multiple-unit operation: "I realized that with those old Armstrong 2-4-0s I had an absolutely classic example of precision suburban train performance. It did not matter which of them was on the job; the running was as regular as clockwork."
- 0-6-0 side tank and saddle tank engines for light duties and shunting. Many of these machines were converted to pannier tanks in the time of Churchward, when Belpaire fireboxes were fitted.

== See also ==
- GWR Joseph Armstrong locomotives (Wolverhampton)
- Locomotives of the Great Western Railway § Joseph Armstrong (Wolverhampton 1854 - 1864, Swindon 1864 - 1877)
- List of residents of Wolverhampton

== Notes ==
Business positions
Preceded by Sir Daniel Gooch	Locomotive, Carriage and Wagon Superintendent of the Great Western Railway; 1864–1877	Succeeded by William Dean
