= GWR Haigh Foundry locomotives =

Class of 2 British 2-2-2 locomotives

GWR Snake and Viper South Devon Railway Exe and Teign
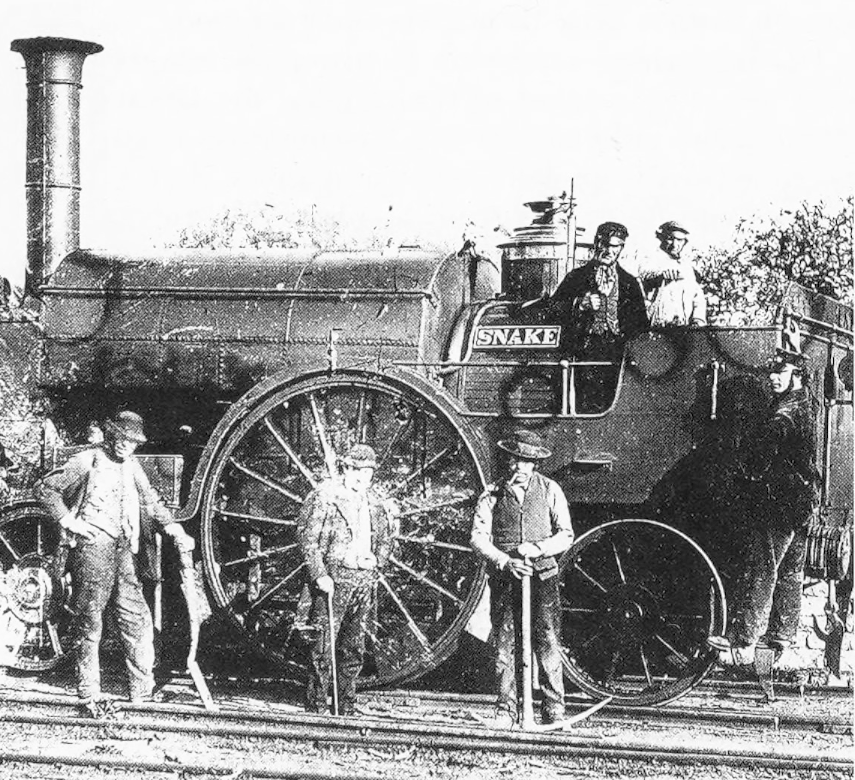
- Snake rebuilt as 2-2-2T locomotive ca. 1865
Type and origin
- Power type: Steam
- Builder: Haigh Foundry
- Serial number: 25–26
- Build date: 1838
- Total produced: 2
Specifications
- Configuration
  - Whyte: 2-2-2; 2-2-2T (after rebuild)
- Gauge: 7 ft 1/4 in (2,140 mm)
- Leading dia.: 3 ft 5 in (1,041 mm)
- Driver dia.: 6 ft 4 in (1,930 mm); 6 ft 0 in (1,829 mm) (after rebuild)
- Trailing dia.: 3 ft 5 in (1,041 mm)
- Wheelbase: 13 ft 0 in (3.96 m)
- Cylinder size: 14.75 in × 18 in (375 mm × 457 mm); 13 in × 18 in (330 mm × 457 mm) (first rebuild); 15 in × 18 in (381 mm × 457 mm) (second rebuild)
Career
- Operators: Great Western Railway; South Devon Railway
- Number in class: 2
- Withdrawn: 1868-1869
- Disposition: Unknown, probably scrapped

The first 19 locomotives ordered by Isambard Kingdom Brunel for the Great Western Railway included two unusual Haigh Foundry locomotives.

Snake and Viper were built at the Haigh Foundry and delivered in September 1838. They had 14.75 in × 18 in (375 mm × 457 mm) cylinders and the driving wheels geared 2:3 to keep the cylinder stroke speed low while allowing high track speed, in line with Brunel's specifications. The boiler had a diameter of 39 in (991 mm) and was 9 ft (2,743 mm) long.

Both locomotives only became useful after modifications in 1839 and 1840, where they were rebuilt with 13 in × 18 in (330 mm × 457 mm) cylinders and a conventional drive. They likely received their 6 ft (1,829 mm) driving wheels at the same time. They were later converted to 2-2-2 tank locomotives, possibly when they were sent to work for the South Devon Railway Company in 1846, where they got the names Exe and Teign. The locomotives returned to the GWR in 1851. Viper operated until January 1868 and Snake November 1869. Viper was afterwards used as stationary boiler in Shrewsbury.

== Names ==
- Snake (Haigh Foundry 25; 1838–1869)
  Named Exe while working on the South Devon Railway between 1846 and 1851, after the River Exe; it reverted to Snake when it returned to the Great Western Railway.
- Viper (Haigh Foundry 26; 1838–1868)
  Named Teign while working on the South Devon Railway between 1846 and 1851, after the River Teign; it reverted to Viper when it returned to the Great Western Railway.
