= Railway Correspondence and Travel Society =

English society for those interested in trains

- Abbreviation: RCTS
- Formation: 1928; 98 years ago
- Founded at: Cheltenham, England
- Type: Charitable Incorporated Organisation
- Registration no.: 1169995
- Legal status: Charity
- Purpose: Railway enthusiasm, history, and preservation
- Headquarters: Leatherhead station
- Location: Leatherhead, United Kingdom
- Coordinates: 51.299°N 0.333°W
- Official language: English
- Main organ: Board of Trustees
- Publication: The Railway Observer
- Website: rcts.org.uk
- Formerly called: Cheltenham Spa Railway Society

The Railway Correspondence and Travel Society (RCTS) is a national society founded in Cheltenham, England in 1928 to bring together those interested in rail transport and locomotives.

Since 1929 the Society has published a regular journal The Railway Observer which records the current railway scene. It also has regional branches which organise meetings and trips to places of interest and an archive & library.

It has published definitive multi-volume locomotive histories of the Great Western, Southern and London & North Eastern Railways, and has in progress similar works on the London, Midland & Scottish Railway and British Railways standard steam locomotives. It also has published many other historical railway books since the mid-1950s.

On 2 November 2016, the RCTS become a Charitable Incorporated Organisation (CIO), registered number 1169995. Its new Archive and Library (located within the former station-master's house at Leatherhead station) was opened on 6 October 2018 by TV personality and antiques expert Paul Atterbury.

== History ==
In 1927 in Cheltenham, a group of rail enthusiasts led by Les Lapper and Aubrey Broad gathered in a garden shed and agreed to form the Cheltenham Spa Railway Society. It is thus one of the oldest Railway enthusiasts societies in the United Kingdom. Lapper and Broad quickly realised that this name lacked national appeal and between them persuaded their fellow members to change it to the Railway Correspondence & Travel Society (RCTS) with effect from January 1928. Later that year this burgeoning Society moved its base to London and set up a Management Committee to oversee its affairs. A small team started producing a monthly magazine for members entitled The Railway News but, following complaints from a publishing company which had purchased an earlier title of that name (albeit, without ever using it), the RCTS changed it to The Railway Observer (RO) in 1929 and has retained that name ever since. It is the Society's proud boast that it has never failed to publish twelve editions of the RO every year since then, including throughout World War II, several national printers' strikes in the 1950s and 1960s plus, more recently, the national lockdowns during the 2020-21 COVID-19 pandemic in the United Kingdom.

On 11 September 1938, the world's first chartered special train exclusively for rail enthusiasts was operated by the RCTS, using the ex-GNR Stirling 'Single' No.1 on a round trip from London Kings Cross to Peterborough North. War intervened to prevent further excursions of this nature but, on 25 May 1946, the Longmoor Military Railway ran a trip around its site for RCTS members then, on 30 September 1950, a tour of the newly formed Southern Region of British Railways ran from Holborn Viaduct to London Victoria using three different steam locomotives, including the Society's 'trademark' Schools class No. 30925 Cheltenham. Providing rail tours for enthusiasts in the UK became a major activity and over 300 ran from 1954 until 1993 when the privatisation of British Rail and a reduction in spare rolling stock made this type of operation untenable for the society.

In 1978, the RCTS celebrated its Golden Jubilee with a weekend of major celebrations based on Cheltenham. At its Annual General Meeting, held at the Queen's Hotel in Cheltenham, members voted overwhelmingly to admit lady members for the first time and thereby started a trend from which many other railway societies have greatly benefited. Later that year, the Society restarted the organisation of overseas tours for members (after a gap of five years), commencing with the ambitious but successful "Golden Jubilee Tour" of South Africa. Several such trips then ran each year, mostly to Europe but also further afield such as two more visits to South Africa and one to India. From 1996, these have dropped to just one a year, usually to a different European destination on each occasion.

As already mentioned above, the RCTS has become renowned for its many authoritative books, in particular its continuing series covering the development of steam locomotives in the UK.

To allow it to become a recognised institution (allowing it to enter contracts for building leases), it became a Charitable incorporated organisation (CIO) from November 2016. Initially, it then functioned with both Trustees and a Management Committee, but both governing bodies were combined into one Board of Trustees from late 2020.

In 2024 the Society's Board of Trustees opened negotiations with the Stephenson Locomotive Society to create closer co-operation between the two organisations and leading to a possible merger.

== Regional branches ==
From the late 1940s, the RCTS has set up branches around the country and today has 29, comprising Bristol & District, Cambridge, Cheltenham, Croydon & South London, East Midlands, Furness, Lakes & Lune, Hitchin, Humberside, Ipswich & District, Lancashire & North West, Merseyside, Cheshire & North Wales, Milton Keynes, Northampton, North East, Peterborough, Scottish, Sheffield, Solent, South East, South Essex, South Wales / De Cymru, Surrey, Thames Valley, Watford, West of England, West Midlands, West Riding and Windsor & Maidenhead.

== See also ==
- Railway enthusiasts societies in the United Kingdom
