= Locomotives of the Great Western Railway =

List of railway locomotives used by the Great Western Railway

Great Western Railway
- Logo of the Great Western Railway, incorporating the shields, crests and mottoes of the cities of London (left) and Bristol (right)

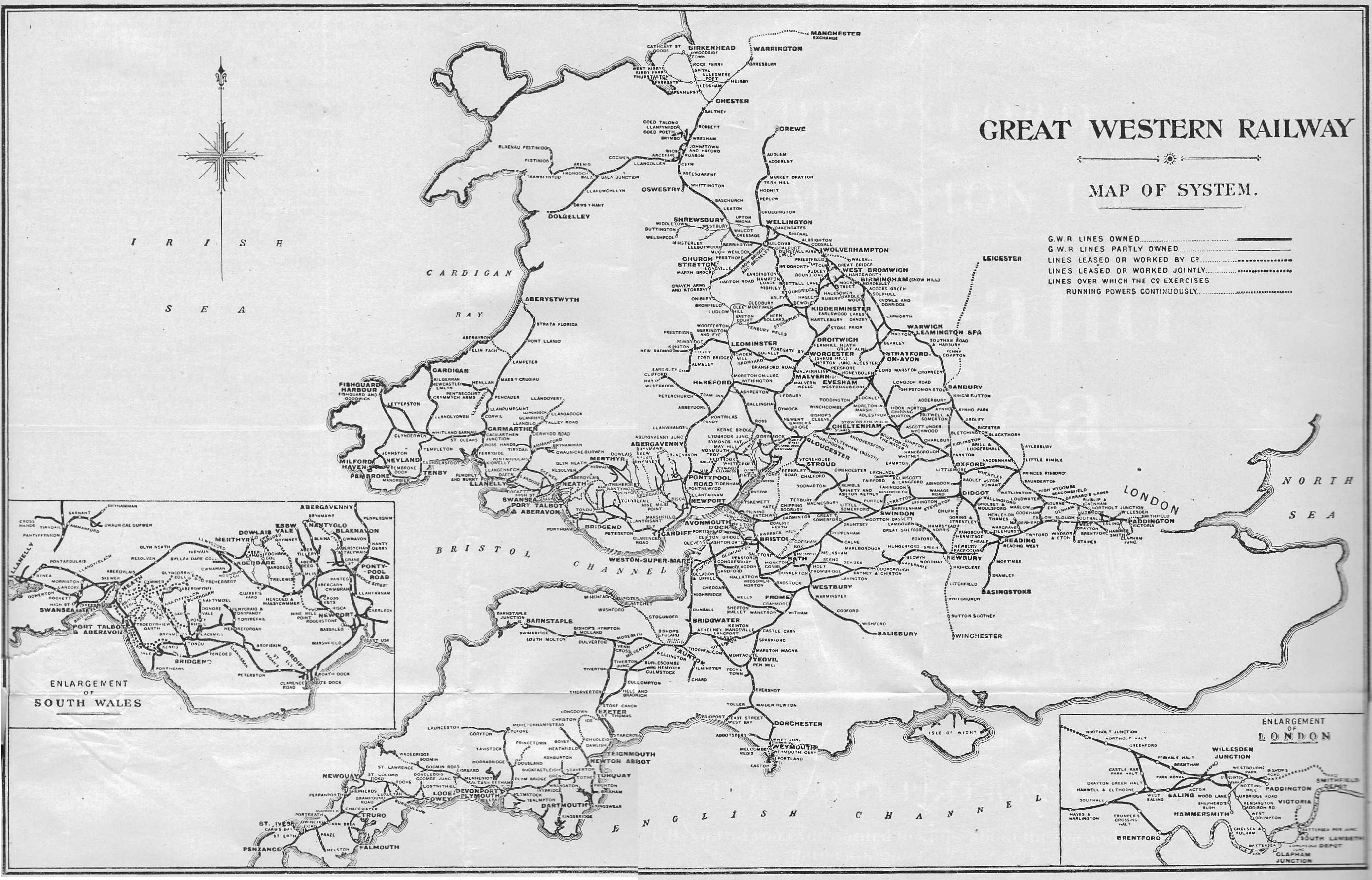
- Map of the railway pre-grouping (1920)

- Map of the railway post-grouping (1926)

History
- 1835: Act of incorporation
- 1838: First train ran
- 1869–92: 7 ft 1/4 in (2,140 mm) Brunel gauge changed to 4 ft 8 1/2 in (1,435 mm) standard gauge
- 1903: Start of road motor services
- 1923: Keeps identity though the Grouping
- 1935: Centenary
- 1948: Nationalised

Successor organisation
- 1948: British Rail, Western Region
Constituent companies
See full list of constituents of the GWR
1854	Shrewsbury and Birmingham Railway; Shrewsbury and Chester Railway
1862	South Wales Railway
1863	West Midland Railway
1876	Bristol and Exeter Railway; South Devon Railway
1889	Cornwall Railway
1922	Rhymney Railway; Taff Vale Railway; Cambrian Railways
1923	Midland & S W Junction Railway

Key locations
- Headquarters: Paddington station, London
- Locale: England; Wales
- Workshops: Swindon; Wolverhampton
- Major stations: Birmingham Snow Hill; Bristol Temple Meads; Cardiff General; London Paddington; Reading General
Route mileage
Mileage shown as at end of year stated
1841	171 miles (275 km)
1863	1,106 miles (1,780 km)
1876	2,023 miles (3,256 km)
1899	2,504 miles (4,030 km)
1919	2,996 miles 68 chains (4,823.0 km)
1921	3,005 miles (4,836 km)
1924	3,797 miles (6,111 km)
1925	3,819 miles 69 chains (6,147.5 km)

The first Locomotives of the Great Western Railway (GWR) were specified by Isambard Kingdom Brunel, but Daniel Gooch was soon appointed as the railway's Locomotive Superintendent. He designed several different 7 ft 1/4 in (2,140 mm) broad gauge types for the growing railway, such as the Firefly and later Iron Duke Class. In 1864 Gooch was succeeded by Joseph Armstrong who brought his standard gauge experience to the workshops at Swindon. To replace some of the earlier locomotives, he put broad gauge wheels on his standard gauge locomotives and from this time on all locomotives were given numbers, including the broad gauge ones that had previously carried just names.

Joseph Armstrong's early death in 1877 meant that the next phase of motive power design was the responsibility of William Dean, his assistant and successor. Dean went on to develop express 4-4-0 types, but the familiar 4-6-0s of later years were initially introduced by the next engineer, George Jackson Churchward. He was also responsible for the introduction of self-propelled Steam Rail Motors for suburban and light branch line passenger trains. Next came Charles Collett in 1921; he standardised the many types of locomotives then in service, producing the iconic Castle and Kings. He also introduced diesel power in the form of streamlined rail cars in 1934. The final engineer was Frederick Hawksworth who took control in 1941 and produced GWR-design locomotives until after nationalisation in 1948.

The GWR expanded rapidly from 1854 by amalgamating with other railways. In 1876 most of the remaining broad gauge companies became a part of the GWR. The Railways Act 1921 finally brought most of the remaining independent companies in the area under its control. Many early locomotives were replaced by standard GWR designs, but many others were rebuilt using standardised components.

== Livery ==
For most of the period of its existence, the GWR painted its locomotives a middle chrome green. They initially had Indian red frames but this was later changed to black. Nameplates and numberplates were generally of polished brass with a black background, and chimneys often had copper or brass rims, often referred to as "caps".

== Great Western Railway locomotives ==
=== Isambard Kingdom Brunel (1835–1837) ===
The GWR's first locomotives were specified by Isambard Kingdom Brunel but did not prove too successful. He had provided manufacturers with a number of requirements (including a piston speed of no more than 280 feet per minute (1.4 m/s) at a running speed of 30 miles per hour (48 km/h), and a maximum weight in working order of 10.5 long tons (11.8 short tons; 10.7 t) on six wheels), and left each manufacturer the freedom to produce designs that would meet those requirements; even with that freedom, these manufacturers found the task difficult. In order to meet his demands some novel ideas were tried such as the Haigh Foundry's geared locomotives and TE Harrison's Hurricane and Thunderer which had the engine and boiler on separate chassis.

- Haigh Foundry 2-2-2s – two delivered in 1838: Snake and Viper
- R and W Hawthorn locomotives – two delivered in 1838: Hurricane and Thunderer
- Mather, Dixon 2-2-2s – six delivered in 1837–40: Premier, Ajax, etc.
- Sharp, Roberts 2-2-2s – three delivered in 1838: Atlas, Eagle, and Lion
- Robert Stephenson locomotives – two delivered in 1837–39: Morning Star and North Star
- Charles Tayleur 2-2-2s – six delivered in 1837–38: Vulcan, Apollo, etc.

The two Star class locomotives were not designed to meet Brunel's specifications – they were bought from Stephenson's surplus stock after another railway had been unable to pay for them. They proved to be the best of the early locomotives, so much so that more of the same design were ordered, and they were used by Gooch as the basis for some of his subsequent designs.

=== Daniel Gooch (1837–1864) ===
More conventional locomotives were soon ordered by Daniel Gooch when he was appointed as the railway's Locomotive Superintendent. Following on from the Star Class that he ordered from Robert Stephenson and Company, he designed a series of standardised and successful locomotive types starting with the Firefly and Sun classes of passenger locomotives, and the Leo and Hercules classes for goods trains. By 1846, Swindon Works had been established and was able to build its own locomotives. The most familiar from this period are the Iron Duke Class with their 8-foot (2.44 m) driving wheels, a type that operated express trains right up to the end of the broad gauge in 1892. Gooch further developed the broad gauge locomotive fleet, producing the first bogie tank design for the steep and curving South Devon lines in 1849, and condensing locomotives for the Metropolitan Railway in 1862. He produced over 100 Ariadne class goods locomotives to a standardised design at a time when most classes ran to only ten or twenty locomotives, and components he designed were often interchangeable between different classes.

With the acquisition of the northern standard gauge lines in 1854 came 56 locomotives, a second workshop at Wolverhampton, and Joseph Armstrong. Wolverhampton was responsible for maintaining standard gauge locomotives for many years, although Daniel Gooch did design some new locomotives that were built at Swindon and carried to Wolverhampton on special trucks. The first, the 57 class were 0-6-0 goods locomotives built in 1855. At the same time some 69 class passenger locomotives were built by Beyer, Peacock and Company in Manchester so were able to be transported on their own wheels. By the time that Armstrong replaced Gooch at Swindon in 1864 many more locomotives had been acquired with the Birkenhead and West Midland Railways.

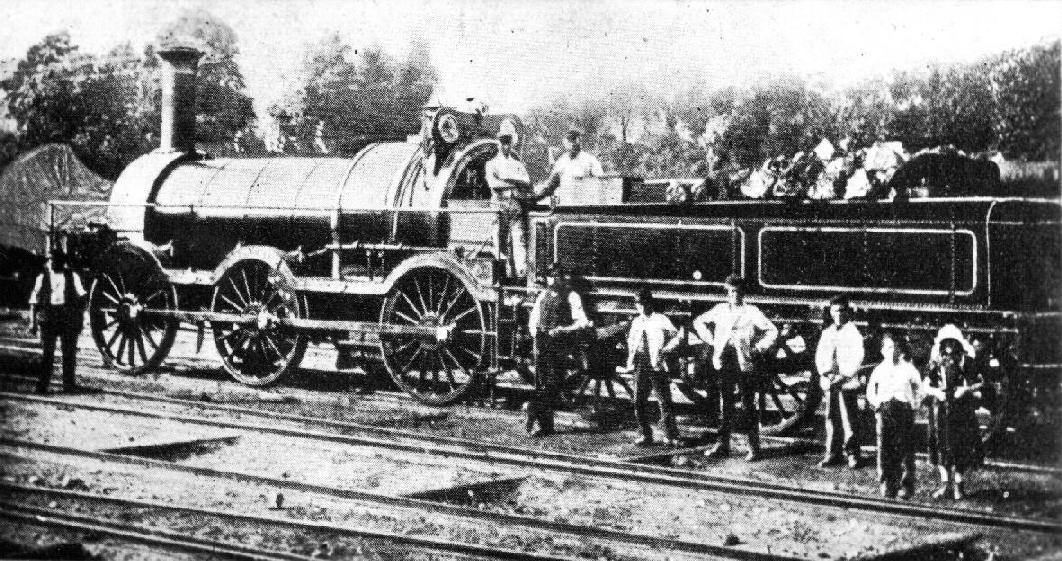
GWR Ariadne class loco "Nemesis", at Trowbridge, not later than 1872

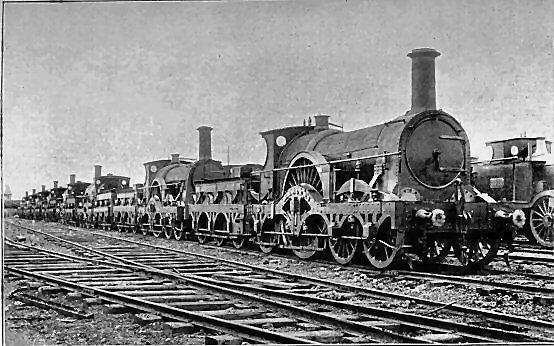
GWR Iron Duke class locos, awaiting scrapping at the end of their life

Broad gauge

- Ariadne class 0-6-0
- Banking class 0-6-0ST
- Bogie class 4-4-0ST
- Caesar class 0-6-0
- Caliph class 0-6-0
- Firefly class 2-2-2
- Hercules class 0-6-0
- Iron Duke class 4-2-2
- Leo class 2-4-0
- Metropolitan class 2-4-0T
- Premier class 0-6-0
- Prince class 2-2-2
- Pyracmon class 0-6-0
- Sir Watkin class 0-6-0T
- Star Class 2-2-2
- Sun class 2-2-2
- Victoria class 2-4-0
- Waverley class 4-4-0

Standard gauge

- 57 Class 0-6-0
- 69 Class 2-2-2
- 77 and 167 Classes 0-6-0
- 79 Class 0-6-0
- 91 Class 0-4-0ST
- 93 Class 0-6-0T
- 131 Class 0-6-0
- "Sharps" or 157 Class 2-2-2
- "England" or "Chancellor" Class 2-4-0
- 320 Class 2-4-0WT
- 322 or "Beyer" Class 0-6-0

=== Joseph Armstrong (Wolverhampton 1854 – 1864, Swindon 1864 – 1877) ===
In 1864 Gooch was succeeded by Joseph Armstrong who brought his standard gauge experience gained in the Northern Division to bear on the larger broad gauge locomotives. He designed the Hawthorn class of 2-4-0 and, in 1870, started the renewal of the Iron Dukes with more powerful boilers. The conversion of many broad gauge lines to standard gauge meant that this was a period of consolidation but in 1876 the amalgamation of the Bristol and Exeter and South Devon Railway locomotives saw 180 locomotives added to the GWR's fleet. To replace some of these earlier locomotives, Armstrong put broad gauge wheels on his standard gauge 1076 Class and from this time on GWR locomotives were given numbers rather than the names that had been carried by broad gauge locomotives up till then.

Armstrong developed the 2-2-2 as his preferred express locomotive, producing 30 of the Sir Daniel class from 1866 and 21 of the Queen class from 1873. Smaller 2-4-0s, such as the 439 class of 1868, worked slower passenger trains while 0-6-0s, such as the 388 class, continued to operate freight trains. Tank locomotives were constructed to operate lighter trains and branch lines, the most familiar of which were the 1076 "Buffalo" class 0-6-0STs (later 0-6-0PT), and the 455 "Metro" class 2-4-0Ts.

Broad gauge

- Hawthorn class 2-4-0, later 2-4-0ST
- Swindon class 0-6-0
- Rover class 4-2-2
- Standard goods 0-6-0
- 1076 Class 0-6-0ST

Standard gauge

- Queen/Sir Alexander Class 2-2-2
- Sir Daniel Class 2-2-2
- 7/8/30/32/110 Class 2-2-2
- 17 Class 2-4-0ST
- 56/717 Class 2-4-0
- 111 Class 2-4-0
- 302 Class 0-6-0ST
- 360 Class 0-6-0
- 388 Class "Standard Goods" 0-6-0
- 439 "Bicycle" Class 2-4-0
- 455 Class 2-4-0T
- 481 Class 2-4-0
- 806 Class 2-4-0
- 927 Class "Coal Goods" 0-6-0
- 1076 Class 'Buffalo' 0-6-0ST

=== George Armstrong (Wolverhampton 1864 – 1897) ===
After his brother was promoted to Swindon, George Armstrong took his place at Wolverhampton and for the next 33 years continued to repair, rebuild and build standard-gauge locomotives in a spirit of independence from Swindon, just as Joseph had done during his own ten years at Wolverhampton. Most of the new locomotives built there were tank engines, some of them very long-lived; a few even survived the Second World War.

- 34 Class 0-6-0
- 108 Class 2-4-0
- 119 Class 0-6-0ST
- 322 Class 0-6-0ST
- 517 Class 0-4-2T
- 633 Class 0-6-0T
- 645 Class 0-6-0ST
- 655 Class 0-6-0ST
- 850 Class 0-6-0ST
- 1016 Class 0-6-0ST
- 1501 Class 0-6-0ST
- 1901 Class 0-6-0ST

=== William Dean (1877–1902) ===
Joseph Armstrong's early death in 1877 meant that the final phase of broad gauge motive power was the responsibility of William Dean. He continued the Iron Duke renewal programme and added more convertibles, including some of Armstrong's 388 class goods locomotives. He also developed some elegant express locomotives such as the 3031 Class singles. Following the abandonment of the broad gauge on 20 May 1892 the majority of the remaining 195 broad gauge locomotives were taken to "the dump" at Swindon. Most of the convertible locomotives were altered to run on the standard gauge over the following 18 months while the remainder were cut up.

Dean had worked under Armstrong on and off for 22 years before becoming his successor and he perpetuated his locomotive policy for some time. He later produced standardised 0-6-0 and 2-6-0 goods locomotives (the 2301 and 2600 "Aberdare" classes), and 0-6-0STs of various sizes (the 2021 and 2721 classes). For express trains he initially developed the 2-2-2 type, culminating with the elegant 3031 class. He later moved on to the 4-4-0 type, producing the Badminton and Atbara classes with 80-inch (2.03 m) wheels, and the Duke and Bulldog classes with 68-inch (1.73 m) wheels. For branch line and suburban trains he built 31 3600 class 2-4-2T locomotives.

Broad gauge

- Nos. 8, 14, 16 2-4-0
- 3001 class 2-2-2
- 3501 class 2-4-0T
- 3521 class 0-4-2ST, later 0-4-4T

Standard gauge The majority of saddle tanks were rebuilt with pannier tanks from 1902 onwards.

- No. 1 4-4-0T later 2-4-0T
- Nos. 7, 8, 14, 16 experimental 2-4-0, later 4-4-0
- No. 13 2-4-2T, later 4-4-0ST
- Nos. 17–19 0-6-4PT crane tanks (based on 850 Class)
- No. 36 4-6-0
- No. 45 0-4-0ST
- River (69 Class) 2-4-0
- Sharpies/Cobham (157 Class) 2-2-2
- 1661 Class 0-6-0ST
- 1813 Class 0-6-0ST
- 1854 Class 0-6-0ST
- 2021 Class 0-6-0ST
- 2201 Class 2-4-0
- 2301 Class 'Dean goods' 0-6-0
- 2361 Class 0-6-0
- 2600 Class 'Aberdare' 2-6-0
- 2602 Class 'Kruger', one 4-6-0 and nine 2-6-0
- 2721 Class 0-6-0ST
- 3001 Class 2-2-2, later 4-2-2
- 3031 Class 'Dean single' or 'Achilles' 4-2-2
- 3201 Class 2-4-0
- 3206 Class 'Barnum' 2-4-0
- 3226 Class 2-4-0
- 3232 Class 2-4-0
- 3252 Class 'Duke' and 'Bird' 4-4-0
- 3300 Class 'Bulldog' 4-4-0
- 3501 Class ex-broad gauge 2-4-0T
- 3521 Class 0-4-2T, later 0-4-4T then 4-4-0 (some tank locomotives ex-broad gauge)
- 3571 Class 0-4-2T
- 3600 Class 2-4-2T
- 4100 Class 'Badminton', 'Atbara', and 'Flower' 4-4-0
- 4120 Class 'Atbara' 4-4-0
- 4149 Class 'Flower' 4-4-0

=== George Jackson Churchward (1902–1922) ===
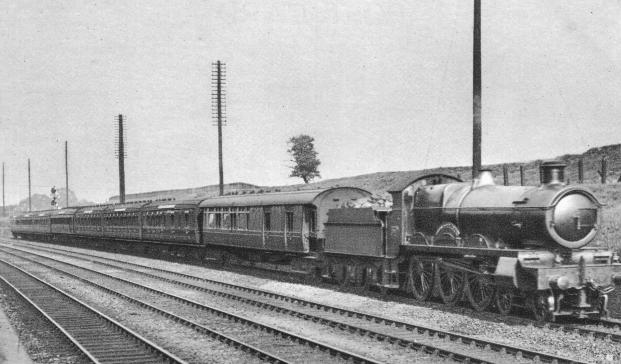
A Saint class locomotive

George Jackson Churchward started his railway career in the South Devon Railway locomotive workshops at Newton Abbot. After that company became a part of the GWR in 1876 he was sent to Swindon and worked under Armstrong and Dean. After his appointment as Locomotive Superintendent in 1902 he developed a series of standard locomotive types with flat-topped Belpaire fireboxes, tapered boilers, long smokeboxes, boiler top feeds, long-lap long-travel valve gear, and many standardised parts such as wheels, cylinders and connecting rods.

For express passenger trains he quickly turned out the City class of 4-4-0s, the first taking to the rails in 1903. The following year one of these, 3717 City of Truro, was reputedly the first locomotive in the world to exceed 100 mph. A larger 4-4-0 was produced in 1904 in the form of the County class, but further increases in size demanded more wheels.

Experiments had already been made for a 4-6-0 design while Dean was still in charge, and these continued under Churchward; the first 4-6-0, number 100, appeared in 1902 as the initial prototype of what became the Saint class. One locomotive was converted to a 4-4-2 for direct trials against French designs that he tried on the GWR in 1903. These experiments moved the GWR towards using four cylinders and they even tried a 4-6-2, 111 The Great Bear which was the first locomotive of this type in the United Kingdom. Production 4-6-0s appeared in 1905 as the two-cylinder Saint class, and were followed in 1906 by the four-cylinder Star class. A freight version of the Saint, the 2-8-0 2800 class was introduced in 1903. For lighter trains a series of 2-6-0s were turned out in 1911, the 4300 class, which were to become the most numerous GWR tender locomotives. In 1919 this design was enlarged to become the 4700 class 2-8-0s.

Churchward's standardisation aims meant that a number of tank locomotives were produced that were based on these tender locomotives. The 2221 class of 1905 were a 4-4-2 tank version of the County class, indeed they were known as the "County Tanks". These were then developed into a 2-6-2T design, being produced as the 3100 class in 1903 and the 3150 class three years later. Smaller 2-6-2Ts, the 4400 class were introduced in 1904 and were succeeded by the slightly larger 4500 class in 1906. Two very different freight tank locomotive types appeared in 1910. The 4200 class was a tank version of the 2800 class, but a demand for small locomotives for working on dock and branch lines was met by the 1361 class, a new design based on the old Cornwall Minerals Railway 0-6-0ST design but using as many of Churchward's standard parts as possible.

Other innovations during Churchward's office included the introduction of self-propelled Steam Rail Motors for suburban and light branch line passenger trains. From 1915 his post was renamed that of the 'Chief Mechanical Engineer'. He also remodelled Swindon Works, building the 1.4 acres (0.57 ha) boiler-erecting shops and the first static locomotive-testing plant in the United Kingdom.

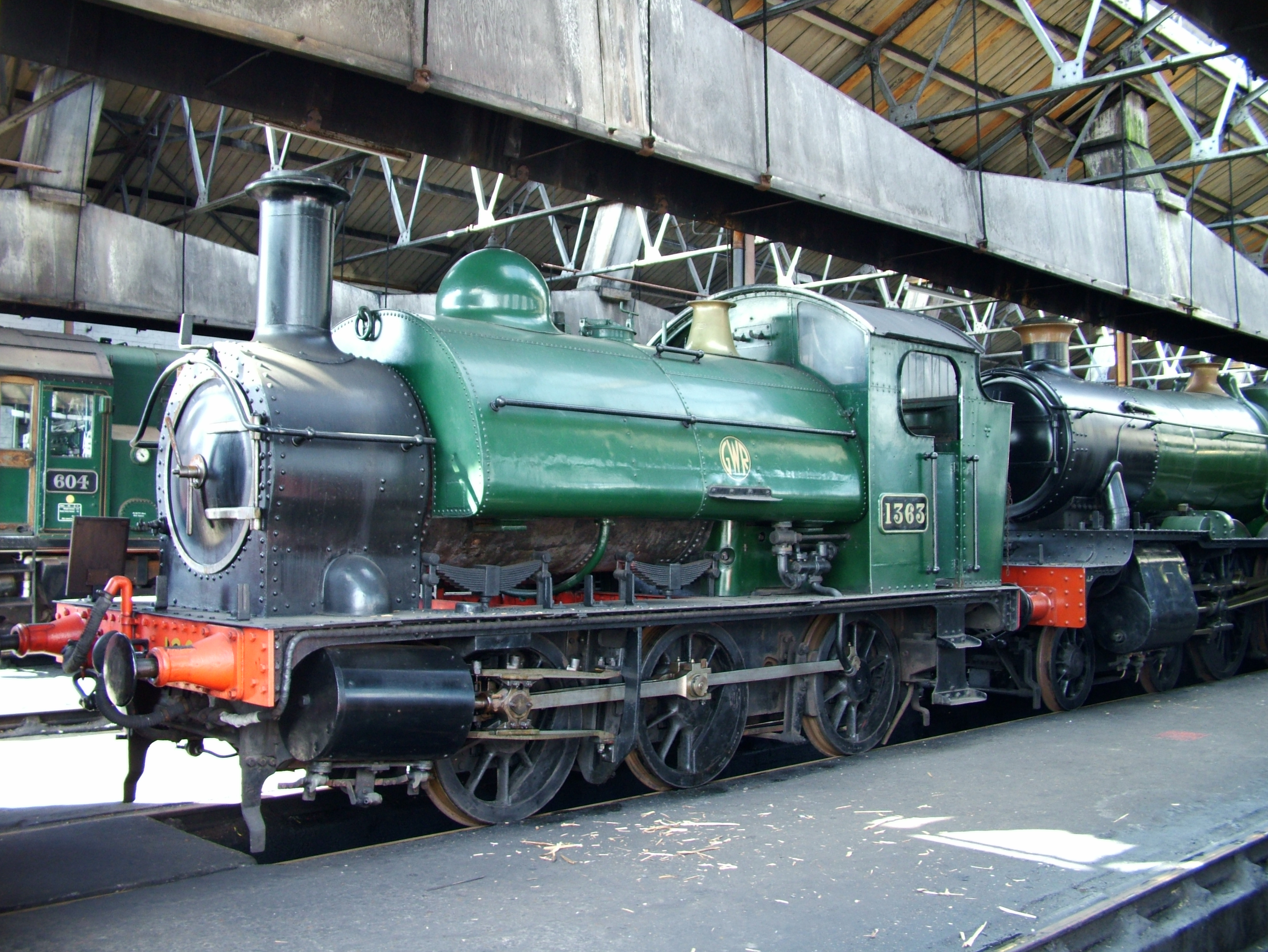
GWR 1361 Class 1363 at Didcot Railway Centre, 2005

- 101 Class (0-4-0 T, oil burning): 101
- La France (4-4-2, compound): 102
- President (4-4-2, compound): 103
- The Great Bear (4-6-2): 111
- 1361 Class (0-6-0 ST): 1361–1365
- County Tank Class (4-4-2T): 2221–2250
- 2800 Class (2-8-0): 2800–2883
- Saint Class (4-6-0): 2900–2955, 2971–2990, 2998
- 3100 Class (2-6-2 T): 31xx (later 51xx)
- 3150 Class (2-6-2 T): 3150–3190
- City Class (4-4-0): 3700–3719
- County Class (4-4-0): 3800–3839
- Star Class (4-6-0): 4000–4072
- 4200 Class (2-8-0 T): 4200–4299, 5200–5204
- 4300 Class (2-6-0): 4300–4399, 5300–5399, 6300–6399, 7300–7321, 8300–8399, 9300–9320
- 4400 Class (2-6-2 T): 4400–4410
- 4500 Class (2-6-2 T): 4500–4574
- 4600 Class (4-4-2 T): 4600
- 4700 Class (2-8-0): 4700–4708
- Steam railmotors
- Petrol-electric railcar

=== Charles Collett (1922–1941) ===
Charles Collett became the Chief Mechanical Engineer in 1921. Almost straight away he had to take on all the locomotives of myriad types from the railways absorbed in 1922 and 1923. Many of these were 'Swindonised', that is they were rebuilt using standard GWR parts. He also set about designing many new types to replace the older examples. Many of the most familiar GWR tank locomotive classes were designed during this period: the 1400 class for small branch lines and auto trains; the 4575 class (a development of the 4500 class with larger tanks) and the large 6100 class 2-6-2Ts; the massive 7200 class of rebuilt 4200 class 2-8-2Ts; and the iconic pannier tanks of the 5700 class, the first of which appeared in 1929.

Collett further developed the 4-6-0 type as the ideal GWR express locomotive, extending the Stars into Castles in 1923, and then producing the largest of them all, the four-cylinder King class, in 1927. He also produced slightly smaller types for mixed traffic (either passenger and goods) duties, the Hall class in 1928, the Grange class in 1934, and the Manor class in 1934. All these continued to carry appropriate names. For lighter goods services he produced his own standard 0-6-0, the 2251 class.

It was under Collett's control that diesel power first appeared on the GWR. He introduced the first streamlined rail cars in 1934 and by 1942 38 had been built, although the latter ones had more angular styling. Some were configured for long-distance express services with buffet counters, others for branch line or parcels work, and some were designed as two-car sets.

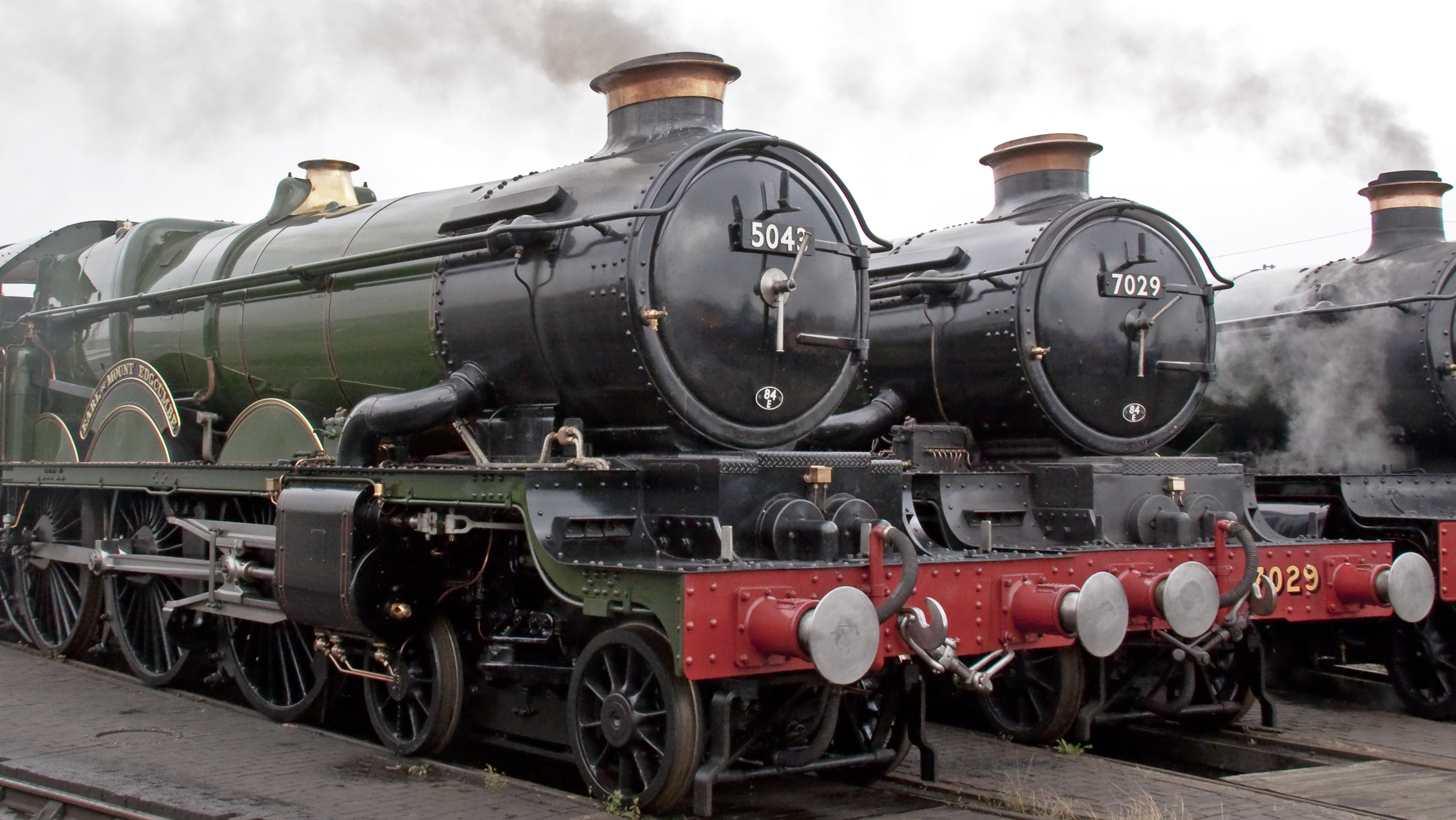
Preserved Castle Class Locomotives 5043 and 7029 at Tyseley.

- Sentinel geared locomotive (0-4-0 TG): 12
- 1101 Class (0-4-0 T): 1101–1106
- 1366 Class (0-6-0 PT): 1366–1371
- 1400 Class (0-4-2 T): 1400–1474 (renumbered 1946 from corresponding numbers in 48xx group – below)
- 2251 Class (0-6-0): 2200–2299, 3200–3219
- 2884 Class (2-8-0): 2884–2899, 3800–3866
- 3100 Class (2-6-2 T): 3100–3104
- Earl or Dukedog Class (4-4-0): 3200–3228, 3265 (later 9000–9028, 9065)
- Castle Class (4-6-0): 4073–4099, 5000–5099, 7000–7037
- 4575 Class (2-6-2 T): 4575–4599, 5500–5574
- 4800 Class (0-4-2 T): 4800–4874 (later 1400–1474)
- Hall Class (4-6-0): 4900–4999, 5900–5999, 6900–6958
- 5101 Class (2-6-2 T): 5101–5199, 4100–4179
- 5205 Class (2-8-0 T): 5205–5264
- 5400 Class (0-6-0 PT): 5400–5424
- 5600 Class (0-6-2 T): 5600–5699, 6600–6699
- 5700 Class (0-6-0 PT): 57xx, 67xx, 77xx, 87xx, 97xx, 36xx, 37xx, 46xx, 96xx
- 5800 Class (0-4-2 T): 5800–5819
- King Class (4-6-0): 6000–6029
- 6100 Class (2-6-2 T): 6100–6169
- 6400 Class (0-6-0 PT): 6400–6439
- Grange Class (4-6-0):6800–6879
- 7200 Class (2-8-2 T): 7200–7253
- 7400 Class (0-6-0 PT): 7400–7449
- Manor Class (4-6-0): 7800–7829
- 8100 Class (2-6-2 T): 8100–8109
- GWR diesel shunters: Diesel shunters 1 and 2
- GWR railcars: Diesel railcars 1–38

=== Frederick Hawksworth (1941–1949) ===
Frederick Hawksworth only became the Chief Mechanical Engineer in 1941 and the Second World War meant that his new designs were few. He updated Collett's Hall class to produce the GWR 6959 Class, known as "Modified Halls", and produced the last GWR 2-cylinder 4-6-0s, the County class 4-6-0, which ended a tradition that had begun with the Saint class 42 years before. Their boilers were based on those of the LMS Stanier Class 8F 2-8-0, a number of which had been built at Swindon during the War. Other designs included three designs of 0-6-0PT: the taper boilered 9400 class; the 1500 class with outside Walschaerts valve gear and no running plate designed for pilot work around large stations; and the very light 1600 Class. Hawksworth had intended to introduce a fleet of Pacifics dubbed the Cathedral class, but this was abandoned.

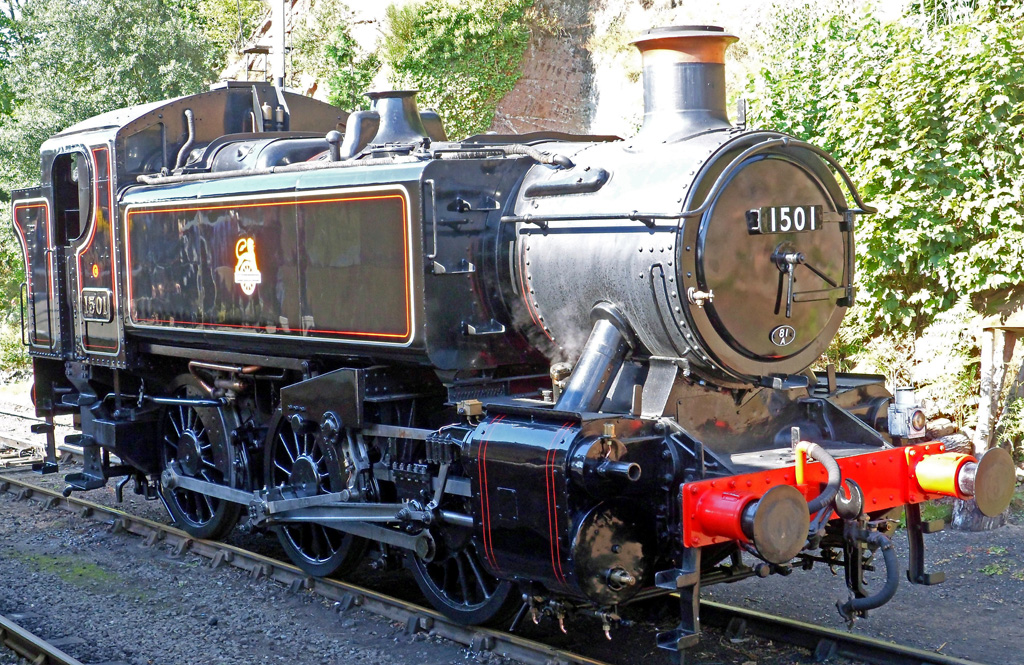
Preserved Hawksworth 1500 Class Pannier Tank 1501 at Bewdley.

- County Class (4-6-0): 1000–1029
- 1500 Class (0-6-0 PT): 1500–1509
- 1600 Class (0-6-0 PT): 1600–1669
- Modified Hall Class (4-6-0): 6959–6999, 7900–7929
- 9400 Class (0-6-0 PT): 9400–9499, 8400–8499, 3400–3409
- GWR diesel shunters: Diesel shunters 501–507 (Introduced as BR 15101-15107)
- GWR Gas turbine-electric locomotives, introduced as British Rail 18000 and British Rail 18100

== Locomotives of amalgamated companies (1854–1920) ==
=== Bristol and Exeter Railway ===
Bristol and Exeter Railway locomotives were absorbed on 1 January 1876. The broad gauge locomotives were numbered in the series 2001 to 2095; the standard gauge locomotives were numbered in the series 1353 – 1382.

- 1353 – 1382 standard gauge locomotives
- 2001 – 2004 Broad gauge 8 feet 10 inch 4-2-4T
- 2005 – 2006 Broad gauge 8 feet 10 inch 4-2-4T
- 2007 – 2014 Broad gauge 4-2-2
- 2015 – 2024 Broad gauge 2-4-0
- 2025 – 2027 Convertible 2-4-0
- 2028 – 2053 Broad gauge 4-4-0ST
- 2054 – 2057 Broad gauge 2-2-2T
- 2058 ex-South Wales Mineral Railway broad gauge 0-4-2T
- 2059 – 2076 Broad gauge 0-6-0
- 2077 – 2090 ex-GWR Swindon Class 0-6-0
- 2091 Broad gauge 0-6-0T
- 2092 – 2093 Broad gauge 0-6-0ST
- 2094 – 2095 Broad gauge 0-4-0T

=== Bristol Port Railway and Pier ===
Jointly vested with the Midland Railway from 1 September 1890. Opened on 6 March 1865, the line was worked by the contractor Waring Bros until 1869 when the company was left to make its own arrangements. Two locomotives were owned by the company but never taken into stock of either the Great Western Railway or the Midland Railway. They were 0-4-2Ts which appear to have been rebuilt from ex-London and North Western Railway tender engines.

=== Carmarthen and Cardigan Railway ===
The Carmarthen and Cardigan Railway was amalgamated with the Great Western Railway on 1 July 1881. Three locomotives (+ 1)

- 1 645 Class 0-6-0ST/0-6-0PT, WPN No 196, GWR No (1881) 902, bought November 1872
- 2 645 Class 0-6-0ST/0-6-0PT, WPN No 194, GWR No (1881) 903, bought October 1872
- 3 645 Class 0-6-0ST/0-6-0PT, WPN No 189, GWR No (1881) 904, bought May 1876
- Victor Fossick & Hackworth, Wks No 176, built 1864 ex Llanelly Railway, 0-6-0, bought December 1872

=== Cornwall Minerals Railway ===
Nine locomotives were transferred from the Cornwall Mineral Railway on 1 July 1877, and a further one on 1 July 1896.

- 1388 Peckett and Sons 0-6-0ST (1896)
- 1392 – 1400 Sharp, Stewart and Company 0-6-0T (1877)

=== Festiniog and Blaenau Railway ===
This railway was of 1' 11½" gauge and was taken over on 13 April 1883. It was later converted to standard gauge as the extension of the new Bala & Festiniog Railway after purchase by the Great Western Railway. Two locomotives were taken over, both being built by Manning Wardle.

- 1 Manning Wardle Wks No 259, 0-4-2ST, built 1868
- 2 Manning Wardle Wks No 260, 0-4-2ST, built 1868

=== Hook Norton Ironstone Partnership ===
This concern was in liquidation when the Great Western Railway purchased an engine in July 1904.

- Hook Norton, Manning Wardle, Wks No 1127, 0-6-0ST, built in November 1889. Eventually sold to the Fishguard & Rosslare Railways & Harbours Company in September 1907, it came back into GW Stock in October 1913 and lasted until January 1926. Given GW No 1337.

=== Liskeard and Caradon Railway ===
Three locomotives were acquired on 1 January 1909, they were used on both the Caradon and the Liskeard and Looe Railways. GWR experimental 4-4-0ST number 13 was also regularly used on the line, at first hired to the Liskeard and Caradon, but it continued to be used after the Great Western Railway took over operations.

- 1308 Lady Margret – an Andrew Barclay Sons & Co. 2-4-0T
- 1311 Cheesewring – a Gilkes Wilson and Company 0-6-0ST
- 1312 Kilmar – a Hopkins Gilkes and Company 0-6-0ST

=== Llanelly Railway ===
The 21 locomotives acquired in 1873 were renumbered into the 894 – 914 series.

=== Llynvi and Ogmore Railway ===
12 locomotives were acquired in 1873, including four which had originated on the West Cornwall Railway. They were renumbered in the 915 – 926 series.

=== Manchester and Milford Railway ===
Seven locomotives were acquired by the Great Western Railway

- 3 Lady Elizabeth, Sharp Stewart 2-4-0 Wks No 1756, delivered in July 1866. Allocated GW No 1305, it was sold immediately.
- 4 Aberystwyth, Manning Wardle 0-6-0 Wks No 255, delivered in July 1868. Given GW No 1339, withdrawn December 1906.
- 5, Sharp Stewart 0-6-0 Wks No 2036 in July 1870. Allocated 1340 but withdrawn in August 1906.
- 2 Plynlimmon, Sharp Stewart 2-4-2T Wks No 3710. Given GW No 1304 and lasted until July 1916.
- 6 Cader Idris, Sharp Stewart 2-4-2T Wks No 4128. Given GW No 1306 and lasted until April 1919.
- 7, London & North Western Railway 0-6-0 built at Crewe in November 1889 as L&NWR 1095. Given GW No 1341 and lasted until November 1906.
- 1, London & North Western Railway 0-6-0 built at Crewe in August 1880 as L&NWR 2387. Given GW No 1338 and lasted until December 1915.
- 8, Great Western Railway 2301 Class (Dean Goods) 0-6-0 (ex GW 2301) on loan from summer 1905.
- 9, Great Western Railway 2301 Class (Dean Goods) 0-6-0 (ex GW 2351) on loan from summer 1905.
- 10, Great Western Railway 2301 Class (Dean Goods) 0-6-0 (ex GW 2532) on loan from summer 1905.

=== Monmouthshire Railway ===
53 (+1) locomotives were taken over in 1875. They were renumbered into the 1301 – 1352 series. Worked from 1 August 1875, amalgamated 1 August 1880.

- 1 Grylls & Co built 1847 0-8-0
- 2, 3, 4, 5 Neath Abbey Ironworks built 1848, 0-6-0
- 6, 7, 8 (GWR 1315–1317) Stothert, Slaughter & Co built 1847, delivered 1849, 0-6-0
- 9, 10 (GWR 1302 & 1301) Sharp Brothers built 1849, 2-4-0WT
- 11 (purchased from the contractors Waring & Son 1849) possibly 0-4-0

=== North Pembrokeshire and Fishguard Railway ===
Taken over July 1898. 3 locomotives (all 0-6-0STs).

- Precelly, Hudswell Clarke, Wks No 175, built January 1875, given GW No 1379 and sold in March 1907.
- Ringing Rock, Manning Wardle, Wks No 630, built in 1876, given GW No 1380 and eventually ended up at the Kent and East Sussex Railway as their No 8 Hesperus until 1941.
- Margaret, Fox, Walker and Company, Wks No 410 was built in November 1878 and given GW No 1378. Sold in 1910 to the Gwendreath Valleys Railway as their No 2 in July 1910. When the Great Western Railway took over that concern, they did not take it into stock but sold it to the Kidwelly Timplate Co. Ltd. in March 1923. It carried a GW Registration Plate No 73 of 1911 and ceased work in 1941. It has since been preserved in a non-operating condition and can be seen at Scolton Manor Museum near Haverfordwest, Pembrokeshire, not far from its original line.

=== Pembroke and Tenby Railway ===
8 locomotives acquired on 1 July 1896.

- 1360 Tenby, 1361 Milford Sharp Stewart 2-2-2T
- 1362 Pembroke Sharp Stewart 2-4-0

(NB ?? Re number 1361 – An extant photo exists in the SLS Stanford Jacobs Collection showing 1361 to be Pembroke.)

- 1363 Owen, 1364 Davies, 1365 Cambria later Tenby Sharp Stewart 0-6-0
- 1813 Holmwood Great Western Railway 1813 class 0-6-0T
- 3201 Stella Great Western Railway Stella class 2-4-0
- Llandinam, a Manning Wardle 0-6-0ST was owned by David Davies and used in the construction of the line. It was removed by him before the directors took over in 1870.
- Further reading can be found at http://members.lycos.co.uk/Graham_Davies/Railways/PandTR.html

=== Severn and Wye and Severn Bridge Railway ===
The railway was vested jointly between the Great Western Railway and the Midland Railway on 1 July 1894 . Seven locomotives were taken over on 1 October 1895.

- Will Scarlet, Fletcher, Jennings & Co. Wks No 122, 0-6-0T was given GW No 1356.
- Little John, Fletcher, Jennings & Co. Wks No 140, 0-6-0T went to the Midland Railway as their 1123A
- Alan-a-dale, Fletcher, Jennings & Co. Wks No 157, 0-6-0T was given GW No 1355
- Maid Marian, Avonside Engine Co. Wks No 940, 0-6-0T was given GW No 1357
- Ranger, a 0-6-0 tender engine was altered to a ST by the Avonside Engine Co. in January 1891 and given GW No 1358
- Wye, Fletcher, Jennings & Co. Wks No 153, 0-6-0ST became GW No 1359
- Severn Bridge, Vulcan Foundry Wks No 860, 0-6-0T, was given GW No 1354
- Gaveller, Vulcan Foundry Wks No 1309, 0-6-0T, was given GW No 1353
- Sharpness, Vulcan Foundry Wks No 850, 0-6-0T, went to the Midland Railway as their 1124A
- Sabrina, Vulcan Foundry Wks No 953, 0-6-0T, went to the Midland Railway as their 1125A
- Forester, Vulcan Foundry Wks No 1163, 0-6-0T, went to the Midland Railway as their 1126A

=== South Devon Railway ===
The 85 broad gauge locomotives added to the Great Western Railway fleet on 1 February 1876 included not just the South Devon Railway locomotives but also the 19 owned by the Cornwall Railway and 8 from the West Cornwall Railway, which had all operated in a common pool since 1866. They were numbered in the 2096 – 2180 series but, generally, also retained their names.

- 1298 – 1300 Three 2-4-0Ts completed by the GWR as standard gauge
- 2096 – 2105 4-4-0ST Comet class
- 2106 – 2121 4-4-0ST Eagle class
- 2122 – 2127 4-4-0ST Gorgon class
- 2128 – 2131 4-4-0ST Leopard class
- 2132 – 2135 ex-Carmarthen and Cardigan Railway 4-4-0ST
- 2136 2-4-0ST
- 2137 2-4-0ST Prince
- 2138 ex-Great Western Railway Banking class 0-6-0ST
- 2139 – 2142 0-6-0ST Tornado class
- 2143 – 2144 0-6-0ST Dido class
- 2145 – 2147 ex-Llynvi Valley Railway 0-6-0ST
- 2148 – 2153 0-6-0ST Dido class
- 2154 – 2155 0-6-0ST Remus class
- 2156 0-6-0ST
- 2157–2159 ex-Great Western Railway Sir Watkin class 0-6-0ST
- 2160 – 2169 0-6-0ST Buffalo class (later rebuilt as standard gauge No.s 1317 – 1325)
- 2170 0-6-0ST Taurus
- 2171 2-4-0T King
- 2172 – 2174 0-4-0WT Owl class (later standard gauge 1327 – 1328)
- 2175 – 2179 0-4-0ST Raven class (later standard gauge 1329 – 1333)
- 2180 0-4-0vb Tiny

=== Torbay and Brixham Railway ===
Vested with the Great Western Railway 1 January 1883. Two broad gauge engines: Queen and Raven. The former was withdrawn from stock on the same day, the latter was an ex-South Devon Railway locomotive and was taken back into GWR stock.

=== Vale of Neath Railway ===
The 19 broad gauge locomotives acquired in 1866 retained their original numbers; the six standard gauge locomotives were renumbered into the 413 – 418 series.

- 1–6 Broad gauge 4-4-0STs
- 7–19 Broad gauge 0-6-0STs
- 413 – 418 standard gauge locomotives

=== Watlington and Princes Risborough Railway ===
Opened on 15 August 1872 and is believed to have been worked with a locomotive on hire from the Great Western Railway. The line was vested into the Great Western Railway on 1 July 1883. Two locomotives were taken over.

- 1 Sharp Stewart, 2-2-2WT. It is believed that it may have been SS Wks No 1016 of 1857, ex Furness Railway No 11.
- 2 Sharp Stewart. 2-4-0T, Wks No 2578 became GWR 1384.

=== Whitland and Cardigan Railway ===
There were three locomotives all standard gauge and were numbered 1385–1387, being taken over 1 September 1886.

- 1385 John Owen Fox, Walker and Company Wks No 170, 0-6-0ST built 1872
- 1386 Fox, Walker and Company Wks No 271, 0-6-0ST, built 1875
- 1387 Fox, Walker and Company Wks No 340, 0-6-0ST, built 1877

=== West Cornwall Railway ===
The eight West Cornwall Railway broad gauge locomotives were operated in a common pool with the South Devon Railway locomotives and are detailed in that section, above. At the same time, 1 February 1876, another eight standard gauge locomotives were also acquired. These were renumbered 1384 – 1391.

- 1384 Robert Stephenson and Company 2-4-0
- 1385 Robert Stephenson and Company 0-6-0
- 1386 Vulcan Foundry 0-6-0ST
- 1387 ex-London North Western Railway 0-6-0
- 1388 ex-London North Western Railway 0-6-0
- 1389 ex-London North Western Railway 0-6-0
- 1390 ex-London North Western Railway 0-6-0
- 1391 Avonside Engine Company 0-4-0ST

== Locomotives from the ROD (1919–1925) ==
In 1919, the GWR purchased 20 ROD 2-8-0 locomotives from the Railway Operating Division. These were based on Robinson's GCR Class 8K. Another 84 locomotives of the same class were hired in 1919–20 but were returned in 1921–22. In 1925, a further 80 locomotives of the same class were purchased, of which nineteen were among those previously hired.

- 3000 Class (2-8-0): 3000–3099

== Locomotives of amalgamated companies (1920–1924) ==
Eighteen companies were merged between 1 January 1922 and 1 January 1924 under the provisions of the Railways Act 1921, bringing 925 locomotives.

=== Alexandra (Newport and South Wales) Docks and Railway ===
39 locomotives acquired on 1 January 1922.

Manufacturer	Type	Quantity	A(N&SW)D&R Nos.	GWR Nos.	Notes
Andrew Barclay Sons & Co.	0-6-2ST	3	29–31	190–193	
Hawthorn Leslie	0-6-2T	1	26	663	
R and W Hawthorn	0-6-0ST	2	12–13	664–665	
Kerr, Stuart & Co.	0-6-0T	2	34–35	666–667	
Robert Stephenson and Company	0-6-0ST	3	15, 20–21	668–670	Double-framed
Hawthorn Leslie	0-6-0ST	2	16–17	671–672	
Robert Stephenson and Company	0-6-0ST	5	1–5	674–678	
Peckett and Sons	0-6-0ST	2	18–19	679–680	
GWR	0-6-0ST	1	33	993	ex-GWR 850 Class
Kitson & Co.	2-6-2T	1	25	1199	ex-Mersey Railway class III
Beyer, Peacock & Co.	2-6-2T	6	6–11	1207–1209, 1211, 1201, 1204	ex-Mersey Railway class II
Hawthorn Leslie	2-6-2T	2	36–37	1205–1206	
Avonside Engine Company	0-4-0ST	2	Trojan and Alexandra	1340–1341	
Beyer, Peacock & Co.	0-6-4T	3	22–24	1344–1346	ex-Mersey Railway class I
Fletcher, Jennings & Co.	0-6-0T	1	32	1356	ex-Severn and Wye Railway
GWR Wolverhampton Works	0-4-2T	1	14	1426	ex-GWR 517 Class
GWR	0-6-0ST	2	27–28	1679, 1683	ex-GWR 1661 Class

=== Barry Railway ===
148 Barry Railway locomotives acquired on 1 January 1922 and given random numbers in several series.

Class	Type	Quantity	Barry Nos.	GWR Nos.	Notes
A	0-6-0T	5	1–5	699–700, 702–703, 706	Three of this class were sold on as industrial locos during the Grouping. GWR 699 was sold to the Coltness Iron Co Ltd in June 1932. It was then transferred to the Warwickshire Coal Company in 1933 for use at the Coventry Colliery, where it worked until 1962. GWR 700 was sold to Guest, Keen and Nettlefolds in Dowlais in October 1927 and scrapped in August 1950. GWR 703 was sold to the Ocean Coal Co Ltd in August 1932 for use at the Lady Windsor Colliery in Ynysbwl; it was scrapped in 1956.
B	0-6-2T	25	6–20, 23–32	198–201, 203–204, 206–214, 223–232	
B1	0-6-2T	42	38–46, 54–63, 73–78, 105–116, 122–126	233–235, 238, 240–277	
C	2-4-2T	2	21–22	1322–1323	
D	0-8-0	4	35–36, 92–93	1387–1390	
E	0-6-0T	5	33–34, 50–51, 53	781–785	
F	0-6-0ST	28	37, 47–49, 52, 64–65, 70–72, 99–104, 127–138	708, 710–726, 807, 729, 742, 747, 74, 776–780	
G	0-4-4T	4	66–69	2–4, 9	
H	0-8-2T	7	79–85	1380–1386	
J	2-4-2T	11	86–91, 94–98	1311–1321	
K	0-6-2T	6	117–121	193–197	
L	0-6-4T	10	139–148	1347–1355, 1357	

=== Brecon and Merthyr Railway ===
47 locomotives acquired on 1 July 1922.

Manufacturer	Type	Quantity	B&MR Nos.	GWR Nos.	Notes
Robert Stephenson & Co.	0-6-2T	14	36–43, 45–50	11, 21, 332, 504, 698, 888, 1084, 1113, 1372–1375, 1668, 1670	36/45 Class, similar to Rhymney Railway R class and P class respectively
Beyer, Peacock & Co.	4-4-2T	1	44	1391	ex-LSWR 46 class No. 0376
Robert Stephenson & Co.	2-4-0T	5	9–12, 25	1402, 1412, 1460, 1452, 1458	
Vulcan Foundry	0-6-2T	4	19–20, 23, 26	1674, 1677, 1692, 1833	
GWR	0-6-0ST	3	32–34	1685, 1693, 1694	ex-GWR 1661 Class
Kerr, Stuart & Co.	0-6-0T	1	35	2161	
Kitson & Co.	0-6-0ST	2	22, 24	2169–2170	
Nasmyth, Wilson & Co.	0-6-0ST	3	27–29	2171–2173	
John Fowler & Co.	0-6-0ST	6	1–4, 13–14	2177–2180, 2185–2186	
Robert Stephenson & Co.	0-6-0ST	6	5–8, 15–16	2181–2184, 2186–2188	
Sharp, Stewart & Co.	0-6-0ST	2	17–18	2190–2191	

=== Burry Port and Gwendraeth Valley Railway ===
15 locomotives acquired on 1 July 1922.

Manufacturer	Type	Quantity	BP&GV Nos.	GWR Nos.	Notes
Hudswell Clarke	0-6-0T	7	2, 9, 11–15	2162–2168	
Avonside Engine Company	0-6-0ST	2	4–5	2194–2195	Named Kidwelly, Cwm Mawr,
Avonside Engine Company	0-6-0ST	2	6–7	2196, 2176	Named Gwendraeth, and Pembury
Chapman and Furneaux	0-6-0ST	1	1	2192	Named Ashburnham
Chapman and Furneaux	0-6-0ST	1	3	2193	Named Burry Port
Hudswell Clarke	0-6-0T	2	8, 10	2197, 2198	No. 8 named Pioneer

=== Cambrian Railways ===
94 standard gauge locomotives acquired on 1 January 1922 given random numbers in various series..

Manufacturer	Type	Quantity	CAM Nos.	GWR Nos.	Notes
Nasmyth, Wilson & Co.	0-4-4T	6	3, 5, 7–9, 23	10, 11, 15, 19–21	Aston
Hunslet Engine Company	0-6-0T	1	24	819	ex-Lambourn Valley Railway, withdrawn 1946
Chapman and Furneaux	0-6-0T	2	26, 35	820–821	ex-Lambourn Valley Railway, withdrawn 1930/32
Manning Wardle	0-6-0ST	1	30	824	ex-Mawddwy Railway
Robert Stephenson & Co.	0-6-0	5	89–93	887–892	Jones, built 1903
Beyer, Peacock & Co.	0-6-0	5	38, 99–102	864, 892–896	Jones, built 1908
Beyer, Peacock & Co.	0-6-0	5	15, 29, 41, 42, 54	844, 849, 855, 873, 887	Jones, built 1918–19
Neilson & Co.	0-6-0	5	73–77	875–876, 878–880	Aston, built 1894
Vulcan Foundry	0-6-0	3	78–80	881–883	Aston, built 1895
Neilson, Reid & Co.	0-6-0	2	87–88	884–885	Aston, built 1899
Sharp, Stewart & Co.	0-6-0	9	4, 14, 40, 45–46, 48–49, 51–52	897–901, 908–911	22 built
Robert Stephenson & Co.	4-4-0	4	94, 96–98	1014, 1029, 1035, 1043	5 built
CAM, Oswestry Works	4-4-0	2	11, 19	1068, 1082	
Sharp, Stewart & Co.	4-4-0	15	81, 61–72, 83–84	1084, 1088, 1090–1091, 1093, 1096–1097, 1100–1107	16 built. 1106 renumbered 1110 in 1926
Robert Stephenson & Co.	4-4-0	4	32, 47, 85–86	1085–1086, 1108–1109	1106 renumbered 1110 in 1926
Sharp, Stewart & Co.	4-4-0	6	50, 60, 16–17, 20–21	1110, 1112, 1115–1118	
Beyer, Peacock & Co.	4-4-0T	6	34, 36, 2, 12, 33, 37	1113–1114, 1129–1132	ex-Metropolitan Railway A Class; 34 & 36 had been rebuilt as 4-4-0 in 1915–16
Sharp, Stewart & Co.	2-4-0T	5	44, 56–59	1190–1192, 1196–1197	
	2-4-0	2	10, 1	1328–1329	ex-GWR 2-4-0
Sharp, Stewart & Co.	2-4-0	4	41, 43, 53, 55	1330–1333	
	4-4-0	2	82, 95	3521, 3546	ex-GWR 3521 Class

==== Vale of Rheidol Railway ====
Three 1 ft 11 1/2 in (597 mm) gauge locomotives acquired with the Cambrian Railways on 1 January 1922, also two new locomotives, similar to the earlier 2-6-2Ts, built in 1923.

Manufacturer	Type	Quantity	CAM Nos.	GWR Nos.	Notes
Davies & Metcalfe	2-6-2T	2	VoR 1 & 2	1212–1213	1213 "renewed" in 1924
W. G. Bagnall	2-4-0T	1	VoR 3	1198	
GWR Swindon Works	2-6-2T	2	—	7–8	built 1923; named Owain Glyndŵr and Llywelyn
GWR Swindon Works	2-6-2T	1	—	1213	built 1924; renumbered 9 in 1949; named Prince of Wales

==== Welshpool and Llanfair Light Railway ====
Two 2 ft 6 in (762 mm) gauge 0-6-0T locomotives acquired with the Cambrian Railways on 1 January 1922.

Manufacturer	Type	Quantity	CAM Nos.	GWR Nos.	Notes
Beyer, Peacock & Co.	0-6-0T	2	WLLR 1 & 2	822–823	Named The Earl and Countess

=== Cardiff Railway ===
36 locomotives acquired on 1 January 1922.

Manufacturer	Type	Quantity	CR Nos.	GWR Nos.	Notes
Kitson & Co.	0-6-2ST	13	20, 22, 33–35, 1, 9–10, 28, 11, 21, 27, 26	151–163	
Hudswell Clarke	0-6-0ST	4	14, 16, 17, 32	681–684	
Kitson & Co.	0-6-0T	8	7, 3, 4, 8, 13, 30, 29	685–688, 690–692	
Kitson & Co.	0-6-0PT	1	2	693	
Parfitt and Jenkins	0-6-0ST	4	12, 15, 18, 19	694–697	
Cardiff Docks	0-6-0ST	1	24	698	
LNWR Crewe Works	2-4-2T	1	36	1327	ex-LNWR 4ft 6in Tank Class
Kitson & Co.	0-4-0ST	2	5, 6	1338, 1339	
	0-6-0ST	3	31, 23, 25	1667, 1676, 1689	ex-GWR 1661 Class

=== Cleobury Mortimer and Ditton Priors Light Railway ===
Two locomotives were acquired on 1 January 1922

Manufacturer	Type	Quantity	CMDP Name	GWR No.	Notes
Manning Wardle	0-6-0ST	2	Cleobury and Burwarton	28 and 29	rebuilt as 0-6-0PT

=== Gwendreath Valleys Railway ===
2 0-6-0ST locomotives were acquired on 1 January 1923. One was given a GWR number, but the second (Margaret) was sold without being allocated a GWR number.

Manufacturer	Type	Quantity	GVR No.	GWR No.	Notes
Hudswell Clarke	0-6-0ST	1	1 Velindre	26	
Fox, Walker & Co.	0-6-0ST	1	2 Margaret	—	Sold to Kidwelly Timplate Company in 1923

=== Llanelly and Mynydd Mawr Railway ===
8 locomotives acquired on 1 January 1923.

Manufacturer	Type	Quantity	LMMR Name	GWR No.	Notes
Andrew Barclay Sons & Co.	0-6-0T	1	George Waddell	312	Sold in 1934
Hudswell Clarke	0-6-0T	2	Tarndune	339	
Hudswell Clarke	0-6-0ST	1	Hilda	359	
Manning Wardle	0-6-0T	1	Victory	704	
Hudswell Clarke	0-6-0T	1	Ravelston	803	
Hudswell Clarke	0-6-0T	1	Merkland	937	
Avonside Engine Company	0-6-0T	1	Great Mountain	944	Sold in 1928
Fox, Walker & Co.	0-6-0ST	1	Seymour Clarke	969	

=== Midland and South Western Junction Railway ===
The M&SWJR's Locomotive Superintendent from 1903 to 1923 was James Tyrell.

29 locomotives acquired on 1 January 1923.

Manufacturer	Type	Quantity	M&SWJ Nos.	GWR Nos.	Notes
Beyer, Peacock & Co.	0-4-4T	1	15	23	
Beyer, Peacock & Co.	2-6-0	1	16	24	
Sharp, Stewart & Co.	4-4-4T	2	17–18	25, 27	
Dübs & Co.	0-6-0T	2	13–14	825, 843	
Beyer, Peacock & Co.	0-6-0	10	19–28	1003–1011, 1013	
North British Locomotive Co.	4-4-0	9	1–8, 31	1119–1126, 1128	
Dübs & Co.	4-4-0	1	9	1127	
Dübs & Co.	2-4-0	3	10–12	1334–1336	

The three Dübs 2-4-0s were the only M&SWJR locomotives to survive into British Railways ownership in 1948. At least one of them was used on the Lambourn Valley Railway, probably because of its light axle load.

=== Neath and Brecon Railway ===
15 locomotives acquired on 1 July 1922.

Manufacturer	Type	Quantity	N&BR Nos.	GWR Nos.	Notes
Robert Stephenson & Co.	0-6-2T	3	11–13	1114, 1117, 1277	similar to Rhymney M class
Robert Stephenson & Co.	0-6-2T	2	9, 10	1327, 1371	ex-Port Talbot Railway 5 and 6
Yorkshire Engine Company	4-4-0T	1	5	1392	
Sharp, Stewart & Co.	2-4-0T	1	6	1400	
	0-6-0ST	2	14–15	1563, 1591	ex-GWR 1076 Class
	0-6-0ST	2	16, 3	1715, 1882	ex-GWR 1701 Class
Nasmyth, Wilson & Co.	0-6-0ST	2	7–8	2174–2175	
Avonside Engine Company	0-6-0ST	2	1–2	2189, 2199	

=== Port Talbot Railway and Docks Company ===
22 locomotives acquired on 1 January 1922.

Manufacturer	Type	Quantity	PTRD Nos.	GWR Nos.	Notes
Robert Stephenson & Co.	0-6-2T	7	8–14	183–187	
Hudswell Clarke	0-6-0ST	6	22–27	808–809, 811–814	
Robert Stephenson & Co.	0-6-0ST	2	3, 15	815, 816	
Sharp, Stewart & Co.	2-4-0T	1	37	1189	
Sharp, Stewart & Co.	2-4-2T	1	36	1326	rebuilt from 2-4-0T in 1898
Sharp, Stewart & Co.	0-8-2T	3	17–19	1358–1360	
Cooke Locomotive & Machine Works	0-8-2T	2	20–21	1378–1379	

=== Powlesland and Mason ===
Powlesland and Mason were contractors at Swansea Docks, and their 9 locomotives were acquired on 1 January 1924.

Manufacturer	Type	Quantity	P&M Nos.	GWR Nos.	Notes
Peckett and Sons	0-4-0ST	3	3, 4, 12	696, 779, 935	Renumbered 1150–1152 between 1949 and 1951
Brush Electrical	0-4-0ST	2	5 and 6	795, 921	
Avonside Engine Co.	0-4-0ST	1	7	925	ex-GWR 1330, South Devon Railway Raven class
Peckett and Sons	0-4-0ST	1	11	927	Renumbered 1153 in 1949
Andrew Barclay Sons & Co.	0-4-0ST	1	14	928	
Hawthorn Leslie	0-4-0ST	1	Dorothy	942	

=== Rhondda and Swansea Bay Railway ===
37 locomotives acquired on 1 January 1922.

Manufacturer	Type	Quantity	R&SB No.	GWR No.	Notes
Kitson & Co.	0-6-2T	4	25–28	164–167	
Kitson & Co.	0-6-2T	12	8–16, 20–22	168–179	
Robert Stephenson & Co.	0-6-2T	2	23, 24	180, 182	ex-Port Talbot Railway
Kitson & Co.	0-6-2T	1	4	181	
GWR	0-6-0ST	4	32, 34, 31, 2	728, 1167, 1652, 1660	ex-GWR 1076 Class
Beyer, Peacock & Co.	0-6-0T	5	1, 3, 5–7	789, 801, 802, 805, 806	
Kitson & Co.	2-4-2T	3	17–19	1307, 1309, 1310	
GWR	0-6-0ST	2	36, 35	1710, 1756	ex-GWR 1701 Class
GWR Swindon Works	0-6-0ST	2	37, 30	1825, 1834	ex-GWR 1813 Class
GWR Swindon Works	0-6-0ST	1	33	2756	ex-GWR 2721 Class

=== Rhymney Railway ===
123 locomotives acquired on 1 January 1922 given numbers in random series.

Class	Type	Quantity	RR Nos.	GWR Nos.	Notes
A	0-6-2T	16	10–15, 18–22, 115–119	52–62, 71–75	
A1	0-6-2T	8	23–30	63–70	
AP	0-6-2T	4	35–38	78–81	
B	0-6-0WT	2	120–121	661–662	
I & J	0-6-0ST	11	48–53, 033, 036	612, 614, 618–619, 622, 625, 629, 631, 657, 659–660	
K	0-6-2T	46	7–9, 57–61, 67–96, 98–105	84–91, 97–101, 105–110, 112–115, 117–119, 122, 127, 129–131, 133–146, 148	
L	2-4-2T	2	65–66	1324–1325	
L1	0-6-2T	2	63–64	159–150	
M	0-6-2T	6	16, 106–110	33, 47–51	
P	0-6-2T	2	4, 6	82–83	
P1	0-6-2T	2	5, 31	76–77	
R	0-6-2T	5	1–3, 17, 97	30–32, 34, 46	
R1	0-6-2T	10	39–47, 62	35–44	
S	0-6-0T	4	111–114	608–611	renumbered 93–96 between 1947 and 1949
S1	0-6-0T	3	32–34	604–606	renumbered 90–92 between 1947 and 1948

=== South Wales Mineral Railway ===
5 locomotives acquired on 1 January 1923.

Manufacturer	Type	Quantity	SWMR No.	GWR No.	Notes
Avonside Engine Company	0-6-0ST	2	6, 7	817, 818	ex-GWR 1317 and 1324 – South Devon Railway Buffalo class
GWR	0-6-0ST	3	5, 3, 1	1546, 1806, 1811	ex-GWR 645 Class

=== Swansea Harbour Trust ===
14 locomotives acquired on 1 July 1923.

Manufacturer	Type	Quantity	SHT Nos.	GWR Nos.	Notes
Hudswell Clarke	0-4-0ST	1	3	150	
Andrew Barclay Sons & Co.	0-4-0ST	1	5	701	Renumbered 1140 in 1948
Peckett and Sons	0-4-0ST	4	7–10	886, 926, 930, 933	
Peckett and Sons	0-4-0ST	3	11, 12, 18	929, 968, 1098	renumbered 1141, 1143, 1145 between 1948 and 1950
Peckett and Sons	0-6-0ST	3	15–17	1085, 1086, 937	1085 & 1086 renumbered 1146 & 1147 in 1949
Hudswell Clarke	0-4-0ST	1	14	943	renumbered 1142 in 1948
Hawthorn Leslie	0-4-0ST	1	13	974	renumbered 1144 in 1948

=== Taff Vale Railway ===
The Taff Vale Railway and its 275 locomotives were acquired on 1 January 1922.

Class	Type	Quantity	TVR Nos.	GWR Nos.	Notes
A	0-6-2T	58	7, 10–12, 20, 45, 75, 80, 90–91, 122–125, 127–130, 132–136, 138–140, 144, 149, 154, 156–160, 162, 164, 165, 400–416, 3, 42, 52, 120	335, 337, 343–349, 351–352, 356–357, 360–362, 364–368, 370–391, 393–394, 397–399, 401–404, 406, 408, 438–441	401–404, 406, 408, 438–441 renumbered 303–309, 312, 316, 322 between 1947 and 1950
C	4-4-2T	6	170–175	1301–1303, 1305, 1308, 1304	
D	0-6-0ST	8	250, 270	797, 798	
E	0-6-0ST	2	264, 265	795, 796	
H	0-6-0T	3	141–143	792–794	renumbered 193–195 in 1948/9. Built for the Pwllyrhebog Incline
I	4-4-0T	3	285–287	1133, 1184, 999	Equipped for auto-train working
K & L	0-6-0	K: 33; L: 9	219, 253, 259, 261, 281, 284, 288, 298, 337, 210, 217, 220, 235–236, 239, 242, 245, 283, 297, 301–302, 304, 313–314, 316, 320, 322, 325, 327–328, 333, 335–336, 339–340, 354, 356–360	912–933, 935–936, 938–939, 941–944, 946, —, 948, 968–970, 974, 978, 984, 1000–1002	
M1	0-6-2T	41	4–5, 14–15, 51, 54, 71, 86–89, 150, 176–181, 16, 22, 24, 50, 53, 74, 145–148, 151–153, 163, 166–169, 344, 349, 362, 364–365	442–445, 462, 466, 478, 481–484, 487–493, 503, 505–508, 511, 513, 515–516, 520, 552, 560, 567, 573, 577–580, 582–586	
N	0-6-2T	10	106–107, 182–189	485–486, 494–496, 498–502	
O	0-6-2T	6	21, 25–26, 33–34, 190	446–448, 452–453, 581	
O1	0-6-2T	14	27–29, 37, 41, 60–65, 70, 73, 78	449–451, 454–455, 471–477, 479–480	
O2	0-6-2T	9	31–32, 44, 66, 81–85	412–413, 415, 419, 421, 423–426	
O3	0-6-2T	2	18–19	410–411	
O4	0-6-2T	41	105, 1–2, 6, 8–9, 17, 35, 38–39, 43, 46, 48–49, 56, 58–59, 67–69, 94–95, 97–98, 101–102, 104, 108–116, 118–119, 121, 13, 36	236, 278–295, 420, 296–302, 310–311, 313–315, 317–321, 324, 333, 409, 414	420, 300, 310–311, 313, 315, 317–321, 324, 333, 409, 414 renumbered 220, 200, 203–205, 207–211, 215–219 between 1946 and 1950
V	0-6-0ST	6	99–100, 275, 280, 290–291	786–791	
S	0-4-0ST	1	267	1342	
T	0-4-0ST	1	266	1343	
U	0-6-2T	8	23, 72, 76–77, 191–194	587, 589–591, 593, 595–597	
U1	0-6-2T	7	30, 40, 79, 195–197	602, 588, 592, 598–599, 603, 600	

== Locomotives of amalgamated companies (1925–1947) ==
=== Corris Railway ===
Two 2 ft 3 in (686 mm) narrow gauge locomotives acquired when the Corris Railway was bought from Imperial Tramways in 1929:

- No. 3 Sir Haydn 0-4-2ST
- No. 4 Edward Thomas 0-4-2ST

=== Weston, Clevedon and Portishead Railway ===
Two locomotives were transferred to the Great Western Railway when Weston, Clevedon and Portishead Railway closed in 1940:

- GWR No.5 ex-LB&SCR A1 Class 0-6-0T "Portishead"
- GWR No.6 ex-LB&SCR A1 Class 0-6-0T

=== Ystalyfera Tin Works ===
- GWR No.1 Peckett and Sons 0-4-0ST "Hercules"

== 1948 and after ==
On 1 January 1948 all existing GWR locomotives became the property of the new British Railways (BR); unlike other companies stock, all the steam locomotives continued to carry their GWR numbers. BR continued to build GWR designs (the 1000, 1500, 1600, 4073 and 6959 classes in particular) for a while. When the first BR Standard steam locomotives started to arrive, they were often compared unfavourably to ex-GWR locos, and the Western Region decided to take forward experiments with diesel-hydraulic and gas turbine locomotives.

Withdrawal of ex-GWR locomotives took place earlier than for the other 'Big Four' companies as the Western Region took the decision to be the first to end steam traction. A handful of locomotives that had been transferred to other regions did survive for longer however. Ironically, because the Barry scrapyard received large numbers of ex-GWR locomotives, proportionately more survive today in preservation than the locomotives of the other companies.

== Named locomotives ==
Most express passenger locomotives carried distinctive names, generally following themes such as kings (the 6000 class), cities (3700 class), counties (3800 class, later the 1000 class), castles (4073 class), and halls (4900 class). This tradition dated back to the first locomotives delivered to the railway, for all broad gauge locomotives initially were identified only by names, numbers first appearing on the standard gauge locomotives acquired with the northern companies that became part of the GWR in 1862.

Several locomotives were honoured with the name Great Western. The first was an Iron Duke class broad gauge locomotive built in 1846, the first locomotive entirely constructed at the company's Swindon locomotive works. This was withdrawn in 1870, but in 1888 a modernised version of the same class was built and given the same name; this was withdrawn just four years later when the broad gauge was taken out of use. A standard gauge 3031 class locomotive, number 3012, was then given the Great Western name. The final GWR locomotive to carry the name was Castle class number 7007, which continued to carry while working for British Railways. The tradition of using this name has continued with British Rail and modern companies up to the present day.

== Preservation ==
More than 140 Great Western locomotives (including some designed by the GWR but built by British Railways) have been preserved. They are mostly in museums or on heritage railways in the United Kingdom, predominantly in the area formerly served by the GWR. Some locomotives that were absorbed in the 1923 grouping also survive today.

=== Dean designed locomotives ===
Class	Number	Based at	Status
2301	2516	Museum of the Great Western Railway	Static display

=== Churchward designed locomotives ===
Class	Number and Name	Based at	Status
Steam railmotor	93	Didcot Railway Centre	Out of service. Original body fitted with new-build steam bogie.
1361	1363	Didcot Railway Centre	Out of service
2800	2807	Gloucestershire Warwickshire Railway	Operational
2800	2818	Museum of the Great Western Railway	Static display
2800	2857	Severn Valley Railway	Out of service
2800	2859	Private site, Congleton	Under restoration
2800	2874	Gloucestershire Warwickshire Railway	Unrestored
3700 'City'	3717/3440; City of Truro	Museum of the Great Western Railway	Static display
4000 'Star'	4003 Lode Star	National Railway Museum	Static display
4200	4247	Dartmouth Steam Railway	Operational
4200	4248	Museum of the Great Western Railway	Static display in dismantled condition
4200	4253	Kent and East Sussex Railway	Under restoration
4200	4270	Gloucestershire Warwickshire Railway	Out of service
4200	4277	Dartmouth Steam Railway	Operational
4300	5322	Didcot Railway Centre	Out of service
4300	7325	Severn Valley Railway	Out of service
4500	4555	Dartmouth Steam Railway	Operational
4500	4561	West Somerset Railway	Out of service
4500	4566	Severn Valley Railway	Static display

=== Collett designed locomotives ===
Class	Number and Name	Based at	Status
Sentinel geared locomotive	12	Buckinghamshire Railway Centre	Operational
1366	1369	South Devon Railway	Operational
2251	3205	South Devon Railway	Out of service
4800/1400	1420 (4820)	South Devon Railway	Out of service
4800/1400	1442 (4842)	Tiverton Museum of Mid Devon Life	Static display
4800/1400	1450 (4850)	Severn Valley Railway	Operational
4800/1400	1466 (4866)	Didcot Railway Centre	Out of service
2884	2885	Tyseley Locomotive Works	Out of service
2884	3802	Llangollen Railway	Operational
2884	3803	Dartmouth Steam Railway	In storage
2884	3814	Llangollen Railway	Undergoing restoration
2884	3822	Didcot Railway Centre	Out of service
2884	3845	Private site	Unrestored
2884	3850	Gloucestershire Warwickshire Railway	Operational
2884	3855	East Lancashire Railway	Undergoing restoration
2884	3862	Northampton & Lamport Railway	Undergoing restoration
3200 'Earl'	3217/9017 Earl of Berkeley	Vale of Rheidol Railway	Static display
4073 'Castle'	4073 Caerphilly Castle	Museum of the Great Western Railway	Static display
4073 'Castle'	4079 Pendennis Castle	Didcot Railway Centre	Operational
4073 'Castle'	5029 Nunney Castle	Locomotive Services Limited	Operational, Mainline certified
4073 'Castle'	5043 Earl of Mount Edgcumbe	Tyseley Locomotive Works	Operational, mainline certified
4073 'Castle'	5051 Earl Bathurst	Didcot Railway Centre	Out of service
4073 'Castle'	5080 Defiant	Tyseley Locomotive Works	In storage
4073 'Castle'	7027 Thornbury Castle	Great Western Society	Unrestored, boiler will be used for new-build GWR 4700 Class 4709
4073 'Castle'	7029 Clun Castle	Tyseley Locomotive Works	Operational, mainline certified
4575	4588	Peak Rail	Out of service
4575	5521	The Flour Mill	Operational
4575	5526	South Devon Railway	Operational
4575	5532	Llangollen Railway	Undergoing restoration
4575	5538	The Flour Mill	Undergoing restoration
4575	5539	Barry Tourist Railway	Undergoing restoration
4575	5541	Dean Forest Railway	Out of service
4575	5542	South Devon Railway	Out of service
4575	5552	Bodmin Railway	Operational
4575	5553	Bodmin Railway	Operational
4575	5572	Didcot Railway Centre	Out of service
4900 'Hall'	4920 Dumbleton Hall	Japan – Warner Bros	Static display
4900 'Hall'	4930 Hagley Hall	Severn Valley Railway	Operational
4900 'Hall'	4936 Kinlet Hall	West Somerset Railway	Out of service
4900 'Hall'	4953 Pitchford Hall	Epping Ongar Railway	Operational
4900 'Hall'	4965 Rood Ashton Hall	Vintage Trains	Out of service
4900 'Hall'	4979 Wootton Hall	Ribble Steam Railway	Undergoing restoration
4900 'Hall'	5900 Hinderton Hall	Didcot Railway Centre	Out of service
4900 'Hall'	5952 Cogan Hall	Tyseley Locomotive Works	Undergoing restoration
4900 'Hall'	5967 Bickmarsh Hall	Northampton & Lamport Railway	Undergoing restoration
4900 'Hall'	5972 Olton Hall	Harry Potter Studio Tour	Static display
5101	5164	Severn Valley Railway	Out of service
5101	5199	West Somerset Railway	Undergoing restoration at Flour Mill
5101	4110	East Somerset Railway	Operational
5101	4121	Tyseley	In storage
5101	4141	Epping Ongar Railway	Out of service
5101	4144	Didcot Railway Centre	Operational
5101	4150	Severn Valley Railway	Undergoing restoration
5205	5224	Peak Rail	In storage
5205	5227	Didcot Railway Centre	Unrestored, a source of parts for the new-build Churchward 4-4-0 County 3840 County of Montgomery
5205	5239	Dartmouth Steam Railway	Operational
5600	5619	Telford Steam Railway	Operational
5600	5637	Swindon & Cricklade Railway	Out of service
5600	5643	Ribble Steam Railway	Undergoing restoration
5600	5668	Kent & East Sussex Railway	Undergoing restoration
5600	6619	Kent & East Sussex Railway	Out of service
5600	6634	Peak Rail	Undergoing restoration
5600	6686	Barry Tourist Railway	Undergoing restoration
5600	6695	Swindon & Cricklade Railway	Operational
5600	6697	Didcot Railway Centre	Static display
5700	3650	Didcot Railway Centre	Out of service
5700	3738	Didcot Railway Centre	Out of service
5700	4612	Bodmin Railway	Out of service
5700	5764	Severn Valley Railway	Static display
5700	5775	Keighley and Worth Valley Railway	Undergoing restoration
5700	5786	South Devon Railway	Out of service
5700	7714	Severn Valley Railway	Operational
5700	7715	Buckinghamshire Railway Centre	Out of service
5700	7752	Tyseley Locomotive Works	Stored
5700	7754	Llangollen Railway	Operational
5700	7760	Tyseley Locomotive Works	Out of service
5700	9600	Tyseley Locomotive Works	Out of service
5700	9629	Pontypool & Blaenavon Railway	Out of service
5700	9642	Gloucestershire Warwickshire Railway	Out of service
5700	9681	Dean Forest Railway	Operational
5700	9682	Dean Forest Railway	Operational
6000 'King'	6000 King George V	Museum of the Great Western Railway	Static display
6000 'King'	6023 King Edward II	Didcot Railway Centre	Out of service
6000 'King'	6024 King Edward I	West Somerset Railway	Out of service
6100	6106	Didcot Railway Centre	Out of service
6400	6412	South Devon Railway	Operational
6400	6430	South Devon Railway	Operational
6400	6435	West Somerset Railway	Out of service
7200	7200	Buckinghamshire Railway Centre	Undergoing restoration
7200	7202	Didcot Railway Centre	Undergoing restoration
7200	7229	East Lancashire Railway	Undergoing restoration
7800 'Manor'	7802 Bradley Manor	Severn Valley Railway	Operational
7800 'Manor'	7808 Cookham Manor	Didcot Railway Centre	Out of service
7800 'Manor'	7812 Erlestoke Manor	Severn Valley Railway	Operational
7800 'Manor'	7819 Hinton Manor	Severn Valley Railway	Static display
7800 'Manor'	7820 Dinmore Manor	Gloucestershire Warwickshire Railway	Out of service
7800 'Manor'	7821 Ditcheat Manor	Swindon Designer Outlet	Static display
7800 'Manor'	7822 Foxcote Manor	West Somerset Railway	Out of service
7800 'Manor'	7827 Lydham Manor	Dartmouth Steam Railway	Operational
7800 'Manor'	7828 Odney Manor	West Somerset Railway	Operational

Collet also built or rebuilt the Vale Of Rheidol locomotives listed under § Narrow gauge locomotives.

=== Hawksworth designed locomotives ===
Class	Number and Name	Based at	Status
1500	1501	Severn Valley Railway	Out of service
1600	1638	Kent & East Sussex Railway	Operational
6959 'Modified Hall'	6960 Raveningham Hall	Margate One:One Collection	Static display
6959 'Modified Hall'	6984 Owsden Hall	Buckinghamshire Railway Centre	Undergoing restoration
6959 'Modified Hall'	6989 Wightwick Hall	Buckinghamshire Railway Centre	Operational
6959 'Modified Hall'	6990 Witherslack Hall	Great Central Railway	Operational
6959 'Modified Hall'	6998 Burton Agnes Hall	Didcot Railway Centre	Out of service
6959 'Modified Hall'	7903 Foremarke Hall	Gloucestershire and Warwickshire Railway	Operational
9400	9400	Museum of the Great Western Railway	Static display
9400	9466	West Somerset Railway	Out of service
Gas Turbine Locomotive	18000	Didcot Railway Centre	Static display

=== Amalgamated/pre-grouping locomotives ===
These pre-grouping locomotives that were absorbed into the GWR in 1923 have been preserved:

- Narberth Road and Maenclochog Railway 0-6-0ST built by Fox, Walker & Company in 1878, NP&FR in 1894, GVR in 1911, GWR No. 1378.
- Alexandra Docks 0-4-0ST Trojan built by Avonside in 1897, GWR No. 1340. Operational at Didcot Railway Centre.
- Taff Vale Railway O1 class 0-6-2T No. 28 built by TVR Cardiff West in 1897, GWR No. 450.
- Cardiff Railway 0-4-0ST No. 5 built by Kitson & Co in 1898, GWR No. 1338. Static display at Didcot Railway Centre.
- Taff Vale Railway O2 class 0-6-2T No. 85 built by Neilson, Reid & Co. in 1899, GWR No. 426.
- Port Talbot Railway 0-6-0ST No. 26 built by Hudswell Clarke in 1900, GWR No. 813. Out of service at the Severn Valley Railway.
- Powlesland and Mason 0-4-0ST No. 6 built by Brush Electrical in 1906, GWR No. 921.
- Swansea Harbour Trust 0-4-0ST No. 13 built by Hawthorn Leslie in 1909, GWR No. 974.

=== Narrow gauge locomotives ===
Three locomotives of 1 ft 11 3/4 in (603 mm) gauge were acquired from the Vale of Rheidol Railway as part of the Cambrian Railways at the grouping, but only one survived to be privatised from British Rail in 1989:

- 2-6-2T VoR no. 2 (originally named Prince of Wales) built by Davies and Metcalfe in 1902, to GWR no. 1213 in 1922, rebuilt 1924, renumbered 9 by British Railways in 1949 and named Prince of Wales in 1956. Still in service.

Two more, similar to no. 1213 as rebuilt, were built by the GWR at Swindon in 1923:

- 2-6-2T No. 7 built by GWR in 1923, named Owain Glyndŵr in 1956 by British Railways
- 2-6-2T No. 8 built by GWR in 1923, named Llywelyn in 1956 by British Railways

These two, together with no. 9, are still running on their original line.

From the 2 ft 6 in (762 mm) gauge Welshpool and Llanfair Light Railway, absorbed into the GWR as part of the Cambrian Railways at the grouping:

- 0-6-0T No 822 The Earl built by Beyer, Peacock & Co. in 1902, preserved as No 822 The Earl on the WLLR
- 0-6-0T No 823 The Countess (renamed Countess by GWR) built by Beyer, Peacock & Co. in 1902, preserved as No 823 Countess on the WLLR

From the 2 ft 3 in (686 mm) gauge Corris Railway, which was purchased by the GWR in 1930:

- 0-4-2ST No. 3 built by Hughes Falcon in 1878, preserved as No. 3 Sir Haydn on the Talyllyn Railway.
- 0-4-2ST No. 4 built by Kerr, Stuart and Company in 1921, preserved as No. 4 Edward Thomas on the Talyllyn Railway.

=== New-build steam ===
The last engine of GWR design built by British Railways was 1600 class No 1669 in May 1955. However, as the railway preservation movement grew, and many types of locomotive were preserved, some people conceived the idea of reconstructing locomotives of classes that had not survived - even in scrapyards - long enough to be preserved. In the early 1970s, the Great Western Society acquired 'Hall' class No 4942 Maindy Hall, in order use it as a basis for reconstructing a 'Saint' class locomotive, the last of which had been scrapped in 1953. More recently, a number of other GWR engine classes have been or are being reconstructed, often taking advantage of the strong standardisation of the Swindon designs to use spare parts from other types. Operational replicas of two broad gauge engines have also been built.

A non-steaming replica of North Star was built by the GWR in 1935 for their centenary. A static replica of Dean single The Queen was created for Madame Tussauds in 1982.

Class	Wheel arr.	Number and Name	Based at	Status	Refs
2900 'Saint'	4-6-0	2999 Lady of Legend	Didcot Railway Centre	Operational. May also run as 4-4-2	
4300 ('Mogul')	2-6-0	9351	West Somerset Railway	Operational. Conversion from 2-6-2T 'Prairie' No. 5193, so has a smaller boiler than standard Moguls.	
1000 Hawksworth 'County'	4-6-0	1014 County of Glamorgan	Didcot Railway Centre	Under construction	
3800 Churchward 'County'	4-4-0	3840 County of Montgomery	Gloucestershire Warwickshire Railway	Under construction	
4700	2-8-0	4709	Tyseley Locomotive Works	Under construction	
6800 'Grange'	4-6-0	6880 Betton Grange	Tyseley Locomotive Works	Completed in April 2024	
'Firefly'	2-2-2 (Broad Gauge)	Fire Fly	Didcot Railway Centre	Out of service	
'Iron Duke'	4-2-2 (Broad Gauge)	Iron Duke	Didcot Railway Centre	Out of service	

Sometimes the Railcar No. 93 is included as 'new build steam', as the power bogie was constructed from scratch; however, the remainder of the coachwork was an original railcar, preserved as noted above.

== See also ==
- GWR locomotive numbering and classification
- List of 7-foot gauge railway locomotive names
- List of GWR broad gauge locomotives
- List of GWR standard classes with two outside cylinders
- GWR oil burning steam locomotives
- Steam locomotives of British Railways
- GWR 0-4-0ST
- GWR 0-6-0PT

== Sources ==
- The ABC of Great Western Locomotives (Ian Allan Ltd 7th Edition) (?)1945
- Allcock, N. J.; Davies, F. K.; le Fleming, H. M.; Maskelyne, J. N.; Reed, P. J. T.; Tabor, F. J. (June 1951). White, D. E. (ed.). The Locomotives of the Great Western Railway, part one: Preliminary Survey. Kenilworth: RCTS.
- Reed, P. J. T. (February 1953). White, D. E. (ed.). The Locomotives of the Great Western Railway, Part 2: Broad Gauge. Kenilworth: RCTS. ISBN 0-901115-32-0. OCLC 650490992.
- Reed, P. J. T. (December 1956). White, D. E. (ed.). The Locomotives of the Great Western Railway, part three: Absorbed Engines, 1854-1921. RCTS. ISBN 0-901115-33-9. OCLC 12654357.
- Tabor, F. J. (February 1956). White, D. E. (ed.). The Locomotives of the Great Western Railway, part four: Six-wheeled Tender Engines. RCTS. ISBN 0-901115-34-7.
- le Fleming, H. M. (April 1958). White, D. E. (ed.). The Locomotives of the Great Western Railway, part five: Six-coupled Tank Engines. RCTS. ISBN 0-901115-35-5. OCLC 500544510.
- Tabor, F. J. (August 1959). White, D. E. (ed.). The Locomotives of the Great Western Railway, part six: Four-Coupled Tank Engines. RCTS. ISBN 0-901115-36-3. OCLC 41540546.
- le Fleming, H. M. (October 1954). White, D. E. (ed.). The Locomotives of the Great Western Railway, part seven: Dean's Larger Tender Engines. RCTS. ISBN 0-901115-18-5. OCLC 655235293.
- le Fleming, H.M. (November 1960) [1953]. White, D.E. (ed.). The Locomotives of the Great Western Railway, part eight: Modern Passenger Classes (2nd ed.). Kenilworth: RCTS. OCLC 500544523.
- le Fleming, H.M. (February 1962). White, D.E. (ed.). The Locomotives of the Great Western Railway, part nine: Standard Two-Cylinder Classes. RCTS.
- Davies, F. K.; Firth, J. M.; Lucking, J. H.; Thomas, R. E.; Allcock, N. J.; Sterndale, A. C.; Barrie, D. S. M.; Reed, P. J. T.; Mountford, E. R. (April 1966). White, D. E. (ed.). The Locomotives of the Great Western Railway, part ten: Absorbed Engines, 1922–1947. RCTS. ISBN 0-901115-20-7.
- Davies, F. K. (May 1956) [1952]. White, D. E. (ed.). The Locomotives of the Great Western Railway, part eleven: The Rail Motor Vehicles and Internal Combustion Locomotives (2nd ed.). RCTS. ISBN 0-901115-38-X. OCLC 655440794.
- Sterndale, A.C.; Parker, L.T.; Smith, C.; Reed, P.J.T.; Tabor, F.J.; Davies, F.K.; Allcock, N.J.; Lucking, J.H. (May 1974). White, D.E. (ed.). The Locomotives of the Great Western Railway, part twelve: A Chronological and Statistical Survey. Kenilworth: RCTS.
- Davies, F.K.; White, D.E. (December 1983). White, D.E. (ed.). The Locomotives of the Great Western Railway, part thirteen: Preservation and Supplementary Information. RCTS. ISBN 0-901115-60-6.
- Davies, Ken (April 1993). The Locomotives of the Great Western Railway, part fourteen: Names and their Origins - Railmotor Services - War Service - The Complete Preservation Story. Lincoln: RCTS. ISBN 0-901115-75-4.
- Casserley, H.C.; Johnston, S.C. (1966). Locomotives at the Grouping: Great Western Railway. Shepperton: Ian Allan Publishing. ISBN 0-7110-0555-9.
- Russell, J.H. (1975). A Pictorial Record of Great Western Engines, Volume 1. Oxford: Oxford Publishing Company. ISBN 0-86093-398-9.
- Stephenson, Brian (1998). "The Pre-1923 GWR Pannier and Saddle Tank Locomotives". Locomotives Illustrated. No. 118. RAS Publishing. ISSN 0307-1804.
- Haresnape, Brian (1976). Churchward locomotives : a pictorial history. London: I. Allan. ISBN 0-7110-0697-0.
