= GWR 3232 Class =

Class of British steam locomotives

Type and origin
- Power type: Steam
- Designer: William Dean
- Builder: GWR Swindon Works
- Order number: Lots 90, 93
- Serial number: 1341–1350, 1381–1390
- Build date: 1892–93
- Total produced: 20
Specifications
- Configuration
  - Whyte: 2-4-0
- Gauge: 4 ft 8 1/2 in (1,435 mm) standard gauge
- Driver dia.: 6 ft 7 in (2.01 m)
- Fuel type: Coal
- Cylinders: Two, inside
- Cylinder size: 17 1/2 in × 24 in (444 mm × 610 mm)
Career
- Operators: Great Western Railway
- Numbers: 3232–3251
- Withdrawn: 1918, 1923, 1925–1930
- Disposition: All scrapped

The 3232 Class were 20 2-4-0 locomotives designed by William Dean and built at Swindon Works for the Great Western Railway in 1892–93, were the GWR's last completely new 2-4-0 design. Their number series was 3232–3251.

== Design ==
They resembled Dean's own 2201 Class and thus also Armstrong's 806 Class, though they had larger cylinders and a shorter wheelbase. All received Belpaire boilers in the course of the normal varied reboilerings.

Table of orders and numbers
| Year | Quantity | Lot No. | Works No. | Locomotive Numbers | Notes |
|---|---|---|---|---|---|
| 1892 | 10 | 90 | 1341–1350 | 3232–3241 | |
| 1893 | 10 | 93 | 1381–1390 | 3242–3251 | |

== Use ==
At the start of their careers these engines replaced their sister 2201s on Swindon-Weymouth trains, on South Wales expresses, and on fast North-to-West trains. Others were in the London and Reading areas, where others also moved when 4-4-0s displaced them from express working. A few went later to Machynlleth and Oswestry, where the last survivor was withdrawn in 1930.

One was withdrawn in 1918; one in 1923; and the rest between 1925 and 1930.
