= GWR 2721 Class =

Class of British 0-6-0ST locomotives

Type and origin
- Power type: Steam
- Designer: William Dean
- Builder: GWR Swindon Works
- Order number: 112, 115, 122, 129
- Serial number: 1662–1681, 1703–1722, 1776–1795, 1887–1906
- Build date: 1897–1901
- Total produced: 80
Specifications
- Configuration
  - Whyte: 0-6-0ST
- Gauge: 4 ft 8 1/2 in (1,435 mm) standard gauge
- Driver dia.: 4 ft 7 1/2 in (1.410 m)
- Wheelbase: 15 ft 6 in (4.724 m)
- Fuel type: Coal
- Cylinders: Two, inside
- Cylinder size: 17 in × 24 in (432 mm × 610 mm), 17 1/2 in × 24 in (444 mm × 610 mm)
Career
- Power class: A
- Number in class: 80
- Numbers: New: 2721–2800; from 1912: 2721–2799, 2700
- Axle load class: Yellow or Blue
- Delivered: November 1897 – March 1901
- Withdrawn: October 1945 – November 1950

The GWR 2721 Class was a class of 0-6-0ST steam locomotives. They were designed by William Dean and built at the Swindon Works of the Great Western Railway between 1897 and 1901.

== Design ==
They were not a new design, being a straightforward development of the 120-strong 1854 Class dating back to 1890. This lineage had begun with George Armstrong's 645 Class in 1872 and continued via the 1813 Class (in 1882), the 1854 Class, and finally ended in 1948 with the GWR 9400 Class. The differences over 76 years were undeniably a gradual evolution, with increases in boiler pressure and heating surface the more important, enclosed cabs and larger bunkers cosmetic but functional. The biggest change was the fitting of a Belpaire firebox necessitating a pair of pannier tanks, as the square-topped firebox is not compatible with a curved saddle tank.

Highlighting the gradual nature of the changes are the subtle differences between the 1854 and 2721 classes, confined to a small increase in wheel size by 1 1/2 inches (38.1 mm), fluted rods and coil springs all round, at least when new. When later rebuilt with pannier tanks they were the direct predecessors of the GWR 5700 Class of 1929. No. 2756 was sold to the Rhondda And Swansea Bay Railway, becoming their No. 33. It regained its old number when the R&SBR was absorbed by the Great Western in 1922.

== Accidents and incidents ==
Pannier tank 2785 was severely damaged in an air raid at Newton Abbott in 1940, but was repaired and returned to service.

== British Railways ==
Forty-three of them survived into British Railways (BR) ownership in 1948, by which time all had been rebuilt with pannier tanks. Their numbers were 2721–2800 (the last being renumbered 2700 in 1912 to make room for the pioneer 2-8-0 GWR 2800 Class). Withdrawals started in 1945 and were complete by 1950 by which time the last of the replacement 57xx's (in the 96xx series) were in service.

== Models ==
Hornby Railways manufacture a model of the 2721 in OO gauge.

== See also ==
- GWR 0-6-0PT – list of classes of GWR 0-6-0PT, including table of preserved locomotives
