= Barry Railway Class C =

Class of Welsh steam locomotives

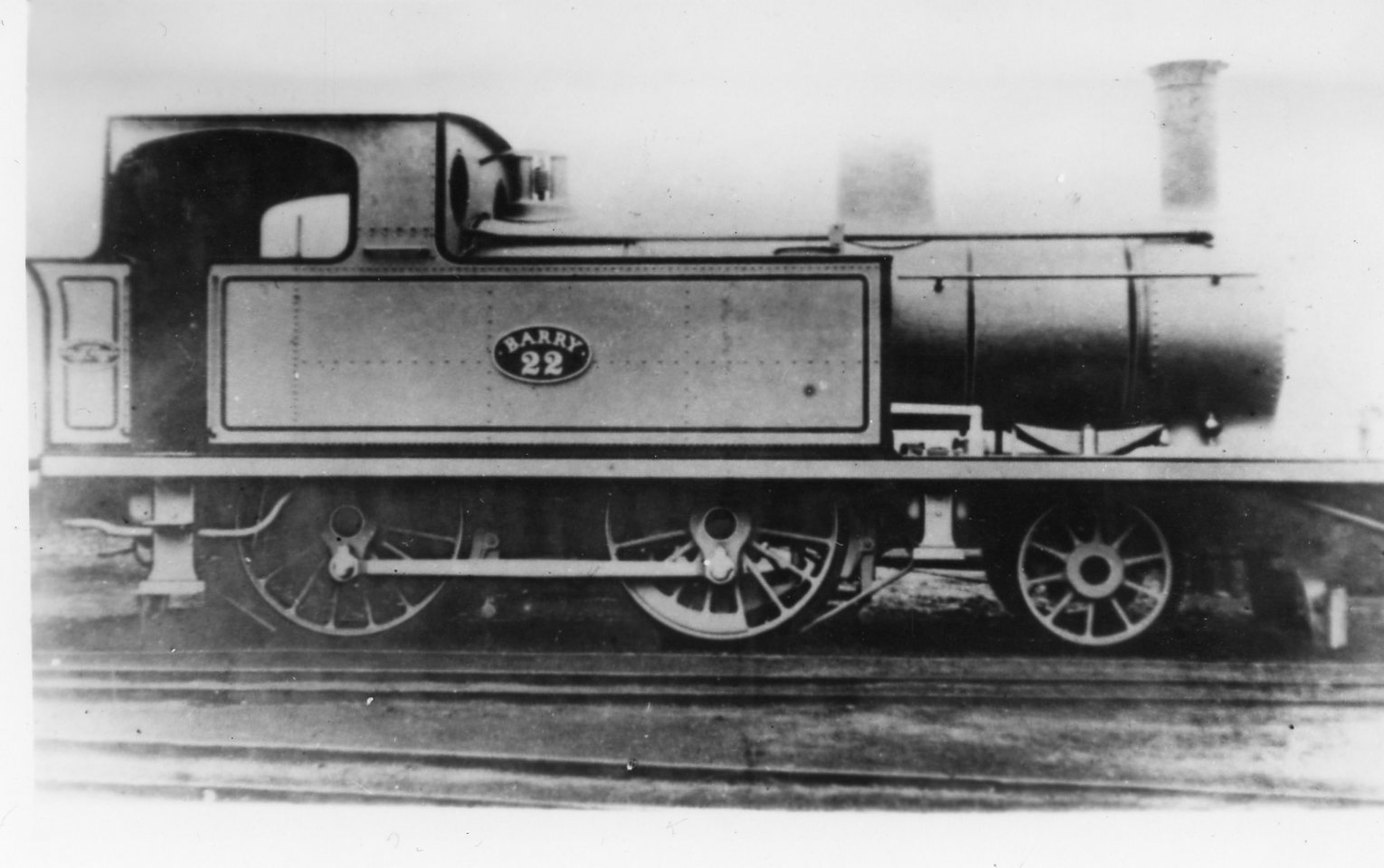
- Barry Railway Class C 2-4-0T
Type and origin
- Power type: Steam
- Designer: J. H. Hosgood
- Builder: Sharp Stewart
- Build date: 1889–1890
- Total produced: 4
Specifications
- Configuration
  - Whyte: 2-4-0T altered to 2-4-2T
  - UIC: 1B n2t altered to 1B1 n2t
- Gauge: 4 ft 8 1/2 in (1,435 mm) standard gauge
- Driver dia.: 5 ft 3 in (1.600 m)
- Trailing dia.: 3 ft 6 in (1.067 m)
- Wheelbase: 15 ft 3 in (4.648 m)
- Loco weight: 41 long tons 2 cwt (92,100 lb or 41.8 t) (46.0 short tons)
- Fuel type: Coal
- Boiler pressure: 150 psi (1.03 MPa)
- Cylinders: Two inside
- Cylinder size: 17 in × 24 in (432 mm × 610 mm)
Performance figures
- Tractive effort: 14,040 lbf (62.45 kN)
Career
- Operators: BR → GWR
- Delivered: 1889–1890
- Withdrawn: 1898–1928
- Disposition: All scrapped

Barry Railway Class C were originally 2-4-0T steam locomotives of the Barry Railway in South Wales. They were designed by J. H. Hosgood and built by Sharp Stewart.

== Traffic duties ==
The locomotive was the first purpose built passenger locomotive built for the company. They pulled passenger trains between Barry and Cogan on the Cardiff branch. However, on 14 August 1893, the Barry Railway began running trains from Barry to Cardiff Riverside station (GWR) having obtained running powers over the Taff Vale from Cogan Junction to Penarth Junction and over the GWR into Cardiff Riverside, a station adjacent to the GWR's main station of Cardiff General.

== Derailment ==
On the first day of service, Class C no. 21 was given the honour of pulling the first train of the new Barry to Cardiff service. It unfortunately disgraced itself by derailing on the sharp curve of Cogan Junction where the Barry joined the Taff Vale Railway. Subsequently, traffic was held up for several hours on both railways.

== Altered wheel arrangement ==
The Class C operated the Barry–Cardiff service, along with the Class G, until the arrival of the Class J in 1897. Its limited fuel and water capacity rendered the Class C inadequate for the longer commuter journey. Therefore, in June 1898, Nos 21 and 22 were taken to Barry Locomotive Works and their wheel arrangement changed from 2-4-0T to 2-4-2T.

== Return to duties ==
They made a limited return to the Cardiff service but ended up being assigned to other duties. For example, No. 21 was given the task of hauling the Directors' saloon, Engineer's saloon and the Manager's Truck. In contrast, No. 22 usually worked colliers' trains on the main line and light passenger trains on the Vale of Glamorgan line. In 1904, the Manager's Truck was converted into the Pay Clerk's Van. Early experiments as a self-propelled petrol engine van failed miserably with numerous breakdowns causing disruption to the scheduled traffic. As a result, No. 21 was reassigned the task of hauling the Van in its new guise. In 1914, the Barry Railway's two steam railmotors were converted into semi-corridor coaches and became known as the "vestibule set". They were hauled by either Nos. 21 and 22 and the train was used on the Barry to Bridgend service.

== Disposals ==
Unusually for the Barry, two of the Class C were disposed of during Barry days. These were Nos. 37 and 52 which were both withdrawn and disposed of in 1898. 37 remained as a 2-4-0T and 52 was converted to a 2-4-2T just before its sale.

Barry number	Date of sale	Purchaser	Date passed to GWR	GWR numbers	Withdrawn	Notes
37	August 1898	Port Talbot Railway	1922	1189	November 1926	
52	November 1898	Port Talbot Railway	1922	1326	August 1930	

== Withdrawal ==
The two remaining locomotives passed to the Great Western Railway in 1922. No. 21 was withdrawn in 1926 and No. 22 in 1928. All were scrapped.

== Numbering ==
Year	Quantity	Manufacturer	Serial numbers	Barry numbers	GWR numbers	Notes
1889	2	Sharp Stewart	3528–3529	21–22	1322–1323	
1890	2	Sharp Stewart	3610, 3626	37, 52	783–784	
