= GWR 1854 Class =

Class of British steam locomotives

GWR 1854 class
Type and origin
- Power type: Steam
- Designer: William Dean
- Builder: GWR Swindon Works
- Order number: Lots 79, 83, 85, 88, 89, 98
- Serial number: 1159–1178, 1201–1220, 1241–1260, 1301–1340, 1433–1452
- Build date: 1890–1895
- Total produced: 120
Specifications
- Configuration
  - Whyte: 0-6-0PT
  - UIC: C n2t
- Gauge: 4 ft 8 1/2 in (1,435 mm) standard gauge
- Driver dia.: 4 ft 7.5 in (1.410 m)
- Frame type: Inside, plate
- Fuel type: Coal
- Cylinders: Two, inside
- Valve gear: Stephenson valve gear
- Valve type: Slide valve
- Train heating: Steam heating
- Loco brake: Vacuum brake and Steam brake
- Train brakes: Vacuum brake
Career
- Operators: Great Western Railway; Western Region of British Railways
- Withdrawn: 1942-1951
- Disposition: All scrapped

The GWR 1854 Class was a class of 0-6-0T steam locomotives designed by William Dean and constructed at the Swindon Works of the Great Western Railway. The class used similar inside frames and chassis dimensions to the 1813 Class of 1882-4. In this they differed from the intervening 1661 Class, which had reverted to the double frames of the Armstrong era. Thus the 1854 Class belongs to the "mainstream" of GWR 0-6-0T classes that leads towards the larger GWR pannier tanks of the 20th century.

== Production ==
The 120 1854s were built in six batches between 1890 and 1895:

Table of orders and numbers
| Year | Quantity | Lot No. | Works Nos. | Locomotive numbers | Notes |
|---|---|---|---|---|---|
| 1890 | 20 | 79 | 1159–1178 | 1854–1873 | |
| 1890–91 | 20 | 83 | 1201–1220 | 1874–1893 | |
| 1891 | 20 | 85 | 1241–1260 | 1701–1720 | |
| 1892 | 20 | 88 | 1301–1320 | 1721–1740 | |
| 1892–93 | 20 | 89 | 1321–1340 | 1751–1770 | |
| 1895 | 20 | 98 | 1433–1452 | 905–907, 1791–1800, 1894–1900 | |

== Rebuilding ==
The engines were rebuilt during their careers with various forms of boiler and saddle tanks, and they were also rebuilt as pannier tanks between 1909 and 1932 with Belpaire fireboxes fitted. Most of the class worked in the GWR's Southern Division, the majority of them in South Wales. Two examples were to be found in the GWR London Division at time of nationalisation. Numbers 907 and 1861 were allocated to 81E (Didcot) in August 1950.

All achieved one million miles (1,600,000 km) in service, and 23 of the class passed into British Railways stock in 1948, the last of them being withdrawn in 1951. The well-known 5700 class was in many ways a development of the 1854 class, retaining the latter's 'four down, two up' layout of springing, longer smokebox and forward-mounted chimney (necessitated by the re-positioning of the regulator within the smokebox). The 17.5 in (440 mm) cylinder and 4 ft 7.5 in (1,410 mm) wheels diameters of the later 2721 class were adopted and the leading frame overhang was extended from 4 ft 9 in (1.45 m) to 5 ft 6 in (1.68 m); the frames were strengthened (and altered in configuration to align with the longer smokebox, unlike the 1854 rebuilds) and the injectors, valances, and wheel centres redesigned (in the latter case a 14-spoke offset crankpin arrangement was substituted for the earlier 16-spoke in-line one).

== Accidents and incidents ==
- On 3 September 1942, a Luftwaffe Ju 88 aircraft attacked the area around Castle Cary station and goods yard. No. 1729 was hit by a bomb, killing the driver. Another bomb hit a signal box, killing the signalman. No. 1729 was later scrapped, and was one of two GWR locomotives damaged beyond repair in Britain during World War II. The other was GWR 4900 Class No. 4911 Bowden Hall.

== Sources ==
- Allcock, N. J.; Davies, F. K.; le Fleming, H. M.; Maskelyne, J. N.; Reed, P. J. T.; Tabor, F. J. (1968) [1951]. White, D. E. (ed.). The Locomotives of the Great Western Railway, part one: Preliminary Survey. Kenilworth: RCTS.
- Bryan, Tim (1995). The Great Western at War 1939–1945 (1 ed.). Yeovil, Somerset, UK: Patrick Stephens. ISBN 1-85260-479-4. OCLC 60238810.
- le Fleming, H. M. (April 1958). White, D. E. (ed.). The Locomotives of the Great Western Railway, part five: Six-coupled Tank Engines. RCTS. ISBN 0-901115-35-5. OCLC 500544510.
- Stewart-David, David; Wood, Peter (2 July 2014). "The role of railways in the Second World War". The Railway Magazine. 160 (1, 360). Horncastle, Lincs, UK: Mortons Media. ISSN 0033-8923.
- British Railways Locomotives 1948–50. Shepperton: Ian Allan. March 1975. ISBN 0-7110-0401-3. 577 DM 375.
