= Cambrian Railways Jones Class 89 0-6-0 =

Cambrian Railways Class 89 GWR Class 15
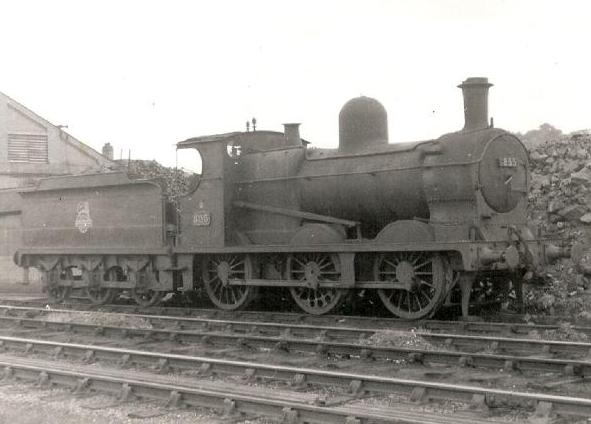
- Cambrian Railways Jones class 855 in her final years of operation.
Type and origin
- Power type: Steam
- Designer: Herbert Jones
- Builder: Beyer, Peacock and Company (9); Robert Stephenson and Company (7)
- Build date: 1903–1919
- Total produced: 16
Specifications
- Configuration
  - Whyte: 0-6-0
  - UIC: C
- Gauge: 4 ft 8 1/2 in (1,435 mm) standard gauge
- Driver dia.: 5 ft 1 1/2 in (1.562 m)
- Wheelbase: 15 ft 6 in (4.724 m)
- Loco weight: 38 long tons (43 short tons; 39 t)
- Tender weight: 48.30 long tons (54.10 short tons; 49.08 t)
- Fuel type: Coal
- Boiler pressure: 160 psi (1.10 MPa)
- Cylinders: Two, inside
- Cylinder size: 18 in × 26 in (457 mm × 660 mm)
- Valve gear: Stephenson
Performance figures
- Tractive effort: 18,625 lbf (82.8 kN)
Career
- Operators: Cambrian Railways; → Great Western Railway; → British Railways
- Class: 89/15
- Power class: BR:unknown
- Withdrawn: 1922 (1), 1952–1954
- Disposition: All scrapped

The Cambrian Railways Class 89s were 0-6-0 tender locomotives introduced by Jones in 1903 for general use over their system, upon grouping they became Great Western Railway class 15 and were reboilered from 1924 onwards with Swindon parts.

== Building ==
The first batch of five locomotives were built by Robert Stephenson and Company (RS). Subsequent batches were built by Beyer, Peacock and Company (BP). The BP-built locomotives had cabs that extended over the full length of the footplate.

Cambrian nos.	GWR Nos.	Maker and order no.	Year built	Serial nos.
15	844	BP 0981	1918	5944
29	849	BP 0981	1918	5945
31	855	BP 0981	1919	5946
38	864	BP 9683	1908	5031
42, 54	873-874	BP 0981	1919	5947-48
89–91	887-889	RS E3	1903	3089-91
92, 93	891-892	RS E3	1903	3092-93
99–102	893-896	BP 9683	1908	5029-30, 5032-33

Nos. 99–102 were numbered 15, 31, 42, 54 until October 1908.

== Withdrawal ==
The first loco withdrawn by the GWR was 888 in May 1922. The first locos withdrawn by BR were 864 and 887 in November 1952 from Machynlleth and Oswestry sheds respectively. The last three locos in the class, 849 Machynlleth, 855, 895 Oswestry, were withdrawn in October 1954. None are preserved.

== Models ==
A Javelin Cambrian Jones Class 89 in 7mm scale.

A 7mm scale (O gauge) model is produced by Javelin Models.
