= GWR 927 Class =

Class of British steam locomotives

Type and origin
- Power type: Steam
- Designer: Joseph Armstrong
- Builder: GWR Swindon Works
- Order number: Lot 36
- Serial number: 503–522
Specifications
- Configuration
  - Whyte: 0-6-0
  - UIC: C
- Gauge: 4 ft 8 1/2 in (1,435 mm) standard gauge
- Driver dia.: 4 ft 6 in (1,372 mm)
Career
- Operators: Great Western Railway
- Class: 927 Class
- Numbers: 927–946

The 927 Class or Coal Goods was series of 20 0-6-0 freight steam locomotives designed by Joseph Armstrong for the Great Western Railway, and built at Swindon Works in 1874. They were numbered in the series 927–946.

== Design ==
The 927s were essentially a variant of Armstrong's own Standard Goods (388) Class, with 4 ft 6 in (1,372 mm) driving wheels rather than 5 ft 0 in (1,524 mm) ones.

== Use ==
They were specifically designed for the heavy trains between Pontypool Road and the Mersey that conveyed Welsh steam coal to the transatlantic shipping lines. (Previous GWR classes used on this work were Daniel Gooch's 79 Class 0-6-0s, and Gooch's later 0-6-0s built by Beyer, Peacock, the 322 Class).

== Withdrawal ==
Most of the 927s were allocated to Birkenhead shed, and they were withdrawn between 1905 and 1928.

== Sources ==
- Allcock, N. J.; Davies, F. K.; le Fleming, H. M.; Maskelyne, J. N.; Reed, P. J. T.; Tabor, F. J. (1968) [1951]. White, D. E. (ed.). The Locomotives of the Great Western Railway, part one: Preliminary Survey. Kenilworth: RCTS.
- Holcroft, Harold (1953). The Armstrongs of the Great Western. London: Railway World.
- Tabor, F. J. (February 1956). White, D. E. (ed.). The Locomotives of the Great Western Railway, part four: Six-wheeled Tender Engines. Kenilworth: RCTS.
