= GWR 806 Class =

Class of British steam locomotives

Type and origin
- Power type: Steam
- Designer: Joseph Armstrong
- Builder: GWR Swindon Works
- Order number: Lot 32
- Serial number: 462–481
- Build date: 1873
- Total produced: 20
Specifications
- Configuration
  - Whyte: 2-4-0
- Gauge: 4 ft 8 1/2 in (1,435 mm) standard gauge
- Driver dia.: 6 ft 6 in (1.981 m)
- Fuel type: Coal
- Cylinders: two
Career
- Operators: GWR
- Retired: 1904-1906
- Disposition: All scrapped

The 806 Class (20 locomotives, nos. 806–825) was Joseph Armstrong's last design of 2-4-0 mixed-traffic locomotives for the Great Western Railway, built at Swindon Works in 1873. A further 20 similar locomotives were added by Armstrong's successor William Dean in 1881-2; numbered 2201–2220, these had modern domeless boilers (see GWR 2201 Class). The class had a similar appearance to the 717 Class but had driving wheels 6 in (152 mm) larger.

== Use ==
Most of the Armstrong locomotives worked in the Southern Division, and carried Sir Daniel Class boilers; only Nos. 806, 807, 810 and 821 were Northern Division engines, and these were in due course fitted with Wolverhampton boilers.

The four Northern engines were stationed at Wolverhampton and worked to Chester, then into Oxford over the Oxford, Worcester & Wolverhampton line. The other Armstrong engines worked on south Wales passenger services. The later, Dean engines were more widely distributed. In their last years they were relegated to milk and branch trains.

== Withdrawal ==
The whole class was withdrawn between 1904 and 1926.
