= Barry Railway Class E =

0-6-0T steam locomotives

Type and origin
- Power type: Steam
- Designer: J. H. Hosgood
- Builder: Hudswell Clarke
- Build date: 1889–1891
- Total produced: 5
Specifications
- Configuration
  - Whyte: 0-6-0T
  - UIC: C n2t
- Gauge: 4 ft 8 1/2 in (1,435 mm) standard gauge
- Driver dia.: 3 ft 3.5 in (1.003 m)
- Wheelbase: 12 ft 0 in (3.658 m)
- Loco weight: 27 long tons 10 cwt (61,600 lb or 27.9 t) (30.8 short tons)
- Fuel type: Coal
- Boiler pressure: 140 psi (0.97 MPa)
- Cylinders: Two inside
- Cylinder size: 14 in × 20 in (356 mm × 508 mm)
Performance figures
- Tractive effort: 11,810 lbf (52.53 kN)
Career
- Operators: Barry Railway; → Great Western Railway; → British Railways
- Delivered: 1889–1891
- Withdrawn: 1932–1949
- Disposition: All scrapped

Barry Railway Class E were 0-6-0T steam locomotives of the Barry Railway in South Wales. They were designed by J. H. Hosgood and built by Hudswell Clarke. The locomotive was designed for light shunting duties at the docks. Their small size made them particularly suited to shunting on the Barry Island Breakwater. Access to the breakwater was via a rough hewn tunnel whose dimensions and sharp curves made it impossible for the other locomotives to negotiate a way through.

== Traffic duties ==
After their initial use as shunting locomotives, they took on passenger duties on the Vale of Glamorgan Railway. Two sets of two coaches were prepared for the role. They comprised a four-wheeled 1888 composite coach and a six-wheeled 1895 brake third which were close coupled. They were known as 'Motor Sets'. At one end of the brake third was a driver's compartment which, unusually, did not have regulator equipment to control the locomotive fitted. Instead a bell system was installed so that the driver could send instructions to the fireman in the locomotive. The controls available in the driver's compartment were a brake and whistle controls which were operated by wires that ran along the top of the coaches and were attached to pulleys located on the dome and cab roof.

The E Class operated with one set as a push-pull unit or with both sets located either side of the engine. This arrangement was used mainly on trains between Barry and Llantwit Major. However, when John Auld was appointed as Locomotive Superintendent in 1909, he did not favour the push-pull arrangement and subsequently ordered that trains should revert to running the engine around the train at the end of its journey.

== Withdrawal ==
The locomotives passed to the Great Western Railway in 1922 and two passed to British Railways in 1947. All were withdrawn and scrapped between 1932 and 1949.

== Numbering ==
Year	Quantity	Manufacturer	Serial numbers	Barry Numbers	GWR Numbers	Notes
1889	2	Hudswell Clarke	331–332	33–34	781–782	
1890	2	Hudswell Clarke	343–344	50–51	783–784	
1891	1	Hudswell Clarke	352	53	785	

== See also ==
- Barry Docks
