= GWR 1661 Class =

Class of 40 British 0-6-0ST locomotives

Type and origin
- Power type: Steam
- Designer: William Dean
- Builder: GWR Swindon Works
- Order number: Lots 69, 71
- Serial number: 1053–1072, 1074–1093
- Build date: 1886–1887
- Total produced: 40
Specifications
- Configuration
  - Whyte: 0-6-0ST
- Gauge: 4 ft 8 1/2 in (1,435 mm) standard gauge
- Driver dia.: 5 ft 0 in (1.524 m)
- Wheelbase: 15 ft 9 in (4.80 m)
- Frame type: Double, plate
- Fuel type: Coal
- Cylinders: Two
Career
- Operators: GWR
- Retired: 1930-1934
- Disposition: All scrapped

The 1661 Class was William Dean's second design of tank locomotive for England's Great Western Railway. Like the 1813 Class which preceded them, there were 40 1661s, turned out of Swindon Works in two batches.

== Construction ==
Table of orders and numbers
Year	Quantity	Lot No.	Works Nos.	Locomotive numbers	Notes
1886	20	69	1053–1072	1661–1680	
1886–87	20	71	1074–1093	1681–1700	

== Design ==
Unlike the 1813s, the 1661s had larger wheels (5 ft 0 in or 1.524 m), double frames with a longer wheelbase (15 ft 9 in or 4.80 m), and saddle, not side tanks. Their frames had originally been ordered for the tender engines of the 2361 Class; however, more 2361s turned out not to be needed, after tank engines (of Joseph Armstrong's 1076 Class) had been found to be successful hauling the heavy coal trains from Aberdare. Like the 2361s, the 1661s carried long boilers (10 ft 6 in or 3.20 m barrel) when new, but shorter boilers were fitted on overhaul. As usual with GWR saddle tanks, pannier tanks were later fitted to most of them, between 1910 and 1926.

== Accidents and incidents ==
- In 1904, locomotive No. 1674 was hauling an express passenger train with GWR 3300 Class 4-4-0 No. 3460 Montreal when it was derailed at Loughor, Glamorgan due to excessive speed. Surging of water in the saddle tanks of No. 1674 was considered a contributory factor. Five people were killed and eighteen were injured. Following the accident, eight of the class were sold to South Wales railways in 1906, duly returning into GWR stock at the Grouping in 1922.
- In 1907, Alexandra (Newport and South Wales) Docks and Railway No.28 (ex GWR 1683) was derailed by catch points at Bassaleg Junction, Monmouthshire, rolled down the embankment and landed in the local cricket field. The locomotive was repaired and spent 15 years on the A(N&SW)D&R.

== Withdrawal ==
The last in service was No. 1685, which ran until 1934. Along with the 1076 class, they were initially used on long distance mineral traffic in the Southern Division of the GWR. To quote le Fleming, "they were always rather misfits", but "...their distinctive features were welcomed by enthusiasts if not by the Running Dept."
