= Barry Railway Class F =

Welsh two-cylinder 0-6-0ST locomotives

Type and origin
- Power type: Steam
- Designer: J. H. Hosgood
- Builder: Sharp, Stewart & Co. (14); Vulcan Foundry (2); North British Locomotive Co. (6); Hudswell Clarke (6)
- Build date: 1890–1905
- Total produced: 28
Specifications
- Configuration
  - Whyte: 0-6-0ST
  - UIC: C n2t
- Gauge: 4 ft 8 1/2 in (1,435 mm) standard gauge
- Driver dia.: 4 ft 4 in (1.321 m)
- Wheelbase: 14 ft 5 in (4.394 m)
- Loco weight: 56 long tons 5 cwt (126,000 lb or 57.2 t) 63.0 short tons)
- Fuel type: Coal
- Fuel capacity: 1 long ton 10 cwt (3,400 lb or 1.5 t) 1.1200000000 short tons)
- Boiler pressure: 160 psi (1.10 MPa)
- Cylinders: Two inside
- Cylinder size: 18 in × 26 in (457 mm × 660 mm)
Performance figures
- Tractive effort: 20,825 lbf (92.63 kN)
Career
- Operators: Barry Railway; → Great Western Railway
- Class: BR: F
- Withdrawn: 1926–1936
- Disposition: All scrapped

Barry Railway Class F were 0-6-0ST steam saddle tank engines of the Barry Railway in South Wales. They were designed by J. H. Hosgood and built by a number of British companies.

== Shunting at Barry Docks ==
The purpose of this locomotive was to carry out heavy shunting duties at Barry Docks. They were in effect a saddle tank version of the Class A, a locomotive which had carried out shunting duties at the docks up to this point. 28 examples of the Class F were manufactured, making it the second largest locomotive class used on the Barry Railway, outnumbered only by the B1 Class. They were fitted with a reversing lever, far quicker for changing direction during shunting duties than the customary screw type reverser. They were all shedded at Barry, and they occasionally worked goods and coal traffic on the main line in addition to their main shunting duties.

== Withdrawal ==
The locomotives passed to the Great Western Railway in 1922, but were withdrawn between 1926 and 1936. However, since they were still in workable condition many were sold privately, the details of which are listed below.

== Numbering ==
Year	Quantity	Manufacturer	Serial numbers	Barry Numbers	GWR Numbers	Notes
1890	3	Sharp, Stewart & Co.	3607–3609	47–49	710–712	
1892	2	Vulcan Foundry	1346–1347	64–65	714–715	
1894-1895	3	Sharp Stewart	4050–4502	70–72	716–718	
1900	8	Sharp Stewart	4593–4600	37, 52, 99–104	708, 713, 719–724	
1905	6	North British Locomotive Company	16628–16633	127–132	725–726, 807, 729, 742, 747	
1905	6	Hudswell Clarke	712–717	133–138	754, 776–780	

== Disposals ==
Barry Numbers	GWR Numbers	Date of Sale	Purchaser	Company Numbers	Scrapped	Notes
37	708	March 1933	Powell Duffryn Steam Coal Co Ltd, Bargoed Colliery	708	October 1947	
48	711	August 1934	Powell Duffryn Steam Coal Co Ltd, Bargoed Colliery	711	July 1960	
49	712	March 1933	Coltness Iron Co Ltd, New Mains Colliery	11	1959	scrapped by EG Steel Ltd, Hamilton
52	713	July 1936	RH Longbotham, Northwood for John Bowes & Partners Ltd	8	September 1946	scrapped by DS Bowran, Gateshead
64	714	September 1934	DS Bowran, Gateshead for Backworth Coal Co Ltd	9	1956	boiler, tanks and wheels used to rebuild 719
65	715	August 1932	Ocean Coal Co Ltd, Deep Navigation Colliery, Treharris	715	September 1950	
71	717	November 1934	RH Longbotham, Northwood for John Bowes & Partners Ltd	9	withdrawn December 1963	
72	718	January 1935	Ashington Coal Co Ltd	22	June 1962	
99	719	November 1934	DS Bowran, Gateshead for Wallsend & Hebburn Coal Co Ltd, Rising Sun Colliery	?	September 1962	rebuilt with boiler, tanks and wheels off No. 714
100	720	November 1936	Partridge Jones & John Paton Ltd, Talywain Ironworks, Abersychan	720	February 1961	
101	721	May 1935	Ocean Coal Co Ltd, Treorchy Colliery	721	between August 1953 and April 1954	
102	722	March 1936	Robert Frazer & Sons Ltd for Cowpen Coal Ltd, Cambois Colliery	13	August 1958	scrapped by Willoughby, Ashington
103	723	January 1935	Ashington Coal Co Ltd	23	October 1960	
104	724	May 1933	Robert Frazer & Sons Ltd for Hartley Main Collieries Ltd	24	April 1960	scrapped by Ellis, Gateshead
127	725	November 1934	RH Longbotham, Northwood for John Bowes & Partners Ltd	10	February 1950	scrapped by Marple & Gillot Ltd, Gateshead
128	726	February 1933	RR Paton Ltd for Amalgamated Anthracite Collieries Ltd, Gwauncaegurwen Colliery	726	1957	
130	729	September 1932	Robert Frazer & Sons Ltd for Hartley Main Collieries Ltd	22	withdrawn December 1963	withdrawn at Hazelrigg Colliery
131	742	August 1932	Ocean Coal Co Ltd, Treorchy Colliery	742	November 1962	
132	747	May 1933	Robert Frazer & Sons Ltd for Hartley Main Collieries Ltd	25	?	
133	754	January 1937	Powell Duffryn Associated Collieries Ltd, Bargoed Colliery	754	July 1960	scrapped as side tank
134	776	February 1933	Powell Duffryn Steam Coal Co Ltd, Aberaman Colliery	776	April 1960	
138	780	May 1936	Burnyeats Brown & Co Ltd, Nine Mile Point Colliery	780	June 1964	
