= GWR 3001 Class =

Class of British steam locomotives

GWR 3001 Achilles Class
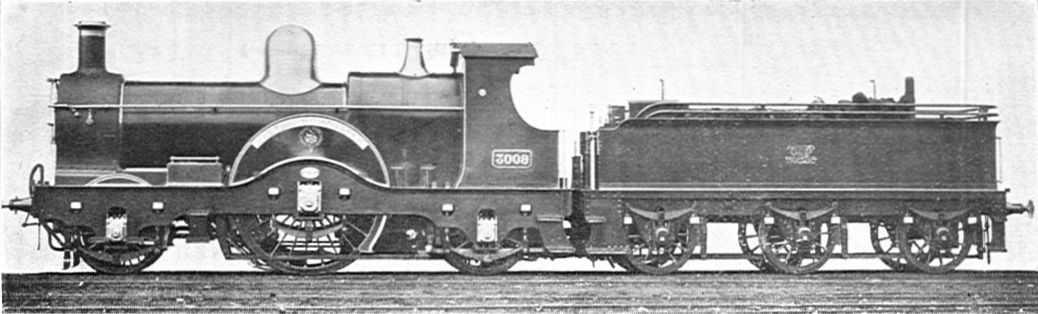
- No. 3009 Flying Dutchman
Type and origin
- Power type: Steam
- Designer: William Dean
- Builder: GWR Swindon Works
- Order number: Lots 84, 86
- Serial number: 1221–1240, 1261–1270
- Build date: 1891–1892
- Total produced: 30
Specifications
- Configuration
  - Whyte: 2-2-2
  - UIC: 1A1 n2
- Gauge: 7 ft 1/4 in (2,140 mm) (Nos. 3021–3028); 4 ft 8 1/2 in (1,435 mm) standard gauge
- Driver dia.: 7 ft 9 in (2.362 m)
- Trailing dia.: 4 ft 7.5 in (1.410 m)
Career
- Operators: Great Western Railway
- Number in class: 30
- Numbers: 3001–3030
- Withdrawn: 1893–1894
- Disposition: All converted to 3031 Class

The 3001 Class as constructed by William Dean at the Swindon Works of the Great Western Railway in 1891-2 was the culmination of the tradition of GWR 2-2-2 locomotives that had begun with Gooch's North Star over 50 years earlier. The 3001s, which had 7 ft 9 in (2.362 m) driving wheels, were built in two batches:

Table of orders and numbers
Year	Quantity	Lot No.	Works Nos.	Locomotive numbers	Notes
1892	20	84	1221–1240	3001–3020	
1891	10	86	1261–1270	3021–3030	3021–3028 built as broad-gauge convertibles

Because of the restricted width available between the large driving wheels, these locomotives were fitted with narrow 4 ft 3 in (1.30 m) diameter boilers. In order to increase the heating surface the boilers were made longer than previous types, and were fitted with raised fireboxes. Despite the fact that the broad gauge was in its very final months, new broad gauge engines were still needed to maintain services, and eight of these new engines, Nos. 3021-3028, were built (as "convertibles") with the wheels outside the frames, to run on the broad gauge. They were duly converted to "narrow" (standard) gauge in summer 1892.

These engines were too heavy at the front end, and after a derailment in 1893 it was decided to give them front bogies. Thus transformed, in 1894 the class joined the 3031 Class, considered one of the most elegant of the entire late Victorian era.

== Sources ==
- Allcock, N. J.; Davies, F. K.; le Fleming, H. M.; Maskelyne, J. N.; Reed, P. J. T.; Tabor, F. J. (1968) [1951]. White, D. E. (ed.). The Locomotives of the Great Western Railway, part one: Preliminary Survey. Kenilworth: RCTS.
- Tabor, F.J. (1956). Locomotives of the Great Western Railway, part four: Six-wheeled Tender Engines. RCTS.
- Russell, J.H. (1999) [1975]. A Pictorial Record of Great Western Engines: Volume One:Gooch, Armstrong & Dean Locomotives. Shepperton: Ian Allan. ISBN 0-86093-398-9.
