= GWR 2201 Class =

Class of British steam locomotives

Type and origin
- Power type: Steam
- Designer: Joseph Armstrong
- Builder: GWR
- Order number: Lot 56
- Serial number: 866–885
- Build date: 1881 to 1882
- Total produced: 20
Specifications
- Configuration
  - Whyte: 2-4-0
- Gauge: 4 ft 8 1/2 in (1,435 mm) standard gauge
- Driver dia.: 6 ft 6 in (1.98 m)
- Fuel type: Coal
- Cylinders: Two, inside
- Cylinder size: 17 in × 24 in (432 mm × 610 mm)

The GWR 2201 Class was a class of 4 ft 8 1/2 in (1,435 mm) standard gauge 2-4-0 steam locomotives built at Swindon Works under the aegis of William Dean for express passenger service on the Great Western Railway. Built in 1881–82, they were numbered 2201 to 2220.

== Design ==
They were ssentially a continuation of Joseph Armstrong's 806 Class of 1873. They differed from the originals in having a cab and a domeless boiler from the start.

== Use ==
The 2201s were widely distributed over the GWR system. Members of the class were in use on the Didcot, Newbury and Southampton Railway around 1910. They were all withdrawn by the end of 1921.

== Sources ==
- Allcock, N. J.; Davies, F. K.; le Fleming, H. M.; Maskelyne, J. N.; Reed, P. J. T.; Tabor, F. J. (1968) [1951]. White, D. E. (ed.). The Locomotives of the Great Western Railway, part one: Preliminary Survey. Kenilworth: RCTS.
- Tabor, F.J. (February 1956). White, D.E. (ed.). The Locomotives of the Great Western Railway, part four: Six-wheeled Tender Engines. Kenilworth: RCTS.
- MacDermot, E.T. (1982) [1964]. History of the Great Western Railway, volume 2, 1863-1921. Ian Allan. ISBN 0-7110-0412-9.
