= Barry Railway Class J =

2-4-2T steam locomotives in Wales

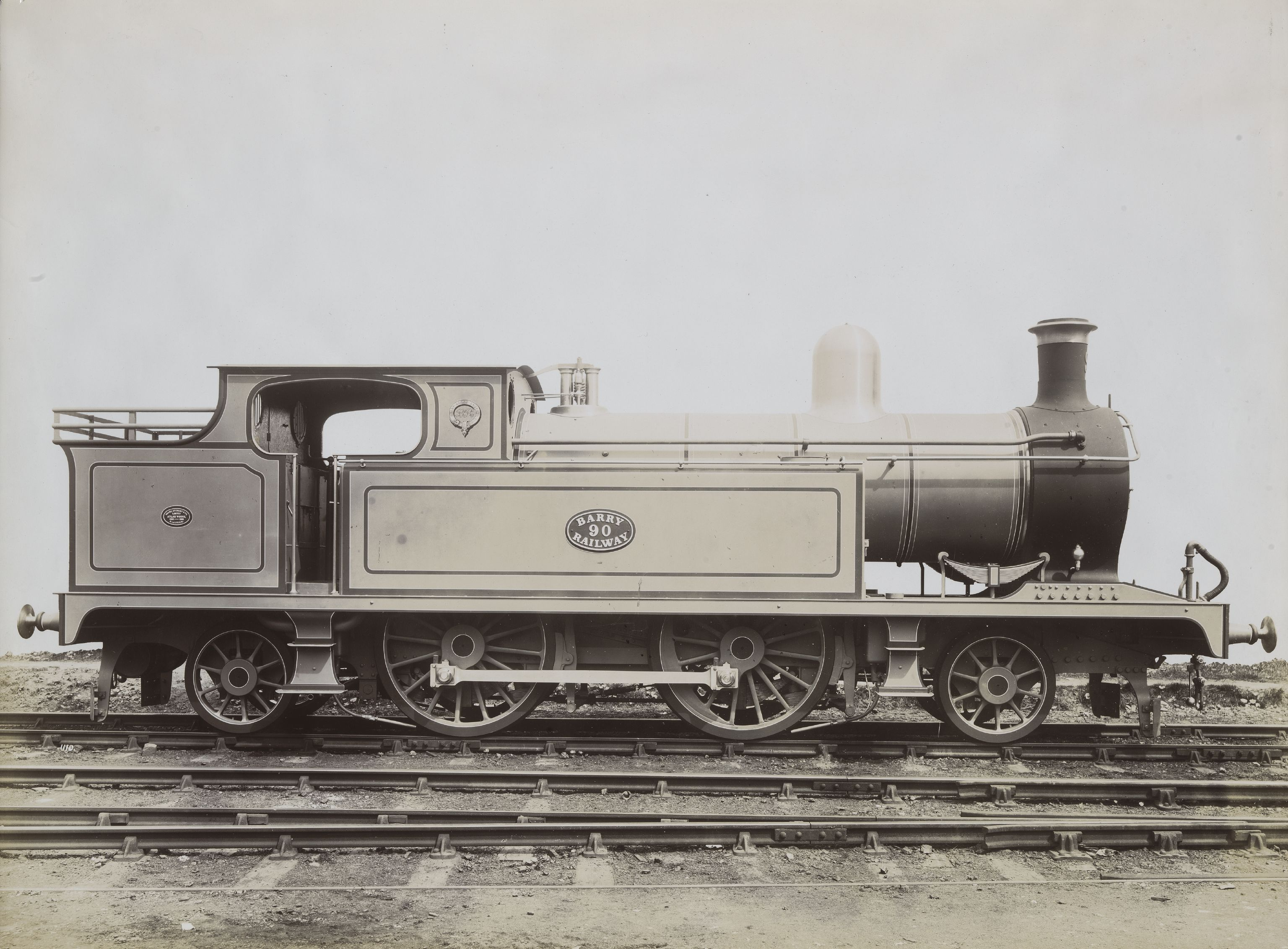
Type and origin
- Power type: Steam
- Builder: Hudswell Clarke (3); Sharp, Stewart & Co. (8)
- Build date: 1897–1899
- Total produced: 11
Specifications
- Configuration
  - Whyte: 2-4-2T
  - UIC: 1B1 n2t
- Gauge: 4 ft 8 1/2 in (1,435 mm) standard gauge
- Driver dia.: 5 ft 7.5 in (1.715 m)
- Trailing dia.: 3 ft 6 in (1.067 m)
- Loco weight: 60 long tons 18 cwt (136,400 lb or 61.9 t) (68.2 short tons)
- Fuel type: Coal
- Boiler pressure: 160 psi (1.10 MPa)
- Cylinders: Two
- Cylinder size: 17 1/2 in × 26 in (444 mm × 660 mm)
Performance figures
- Tractive effort: 15,925 lbf (70.84 kN)
Career
- Operators: Barry Railway; → Great Western Railway
- Withdrawn: 1926–1930
- Disposition: All scrapped

Barry Railway Class J were 2-4-2T steam locomotives of the Barry Railway in South Wales. They were designed by J. F. Hosgood, built by both Hudswell Clarke and Sharp, Stewart and Company and were introduced in 1897. Their main use was on the Barry to Cardiff suburban service and had a reputation for always being smartly turned out. They were all shedded at Barry. The locomotives passed to the Great Western Railway in 1922 and were all scrapped by 1930.

== Numbering ==
Year	Quantity	Manufacturer	Serial numbers	Barry numbers	GWR numbers	Notes
1897	3	Hudswell Clarke	473–475	86–88	1311–1313	
1898	3	Sharp, Stewart & Co.	4367–4369	89–91	1314–1316	
1899	5	Sharp, Stewart & Co.	4497–4501	94–98	1317–1321	
