= Barry Railway Class G =

Class of 0-4-4T steam locomotives

Type and origin
- Power type: Steam
- Designer: J. F. Hosgood
- Builder: Vulcan Foundry (2); Sharp, Stewart & Co. (2)
- Build date: 1892 and 1895
- Total produced: 4
Specifications
- Configuration
  - Whyte: 0-4-4T
  - UIC: B2' n2t
- Gauge: 4 ft 8 1/2 in (1,435 mm) standard gauge
- Driver dia.: 5 ft 7 1/2 in (1.715 m)
- Trailing dia.: 3 ft 0 in (0.914 m)
- Wheelbase: 22 ft 5 in (6.833 m)
- Loco weight: 56 long tons 1 cwt (125,600 lb or 56.9 t) (62.8 short tons)
- Fuel type: Coal
- Cylinders: Two inside
- Cylinder size: 17 1/2 in × 26 in (444 mm × 660 mm)
Performance figures
- Tractive effort: 15,925 lbf (70.84 kN)
Career
- Operators: Barry Railway; → Great Western Railway
- Class: BR: G
- Numbers: BR: 66–69; GWR: 2–4, 9
- Delivered: 1892 and 1895
- Withdrawn: 1925–1929
- Disposition: All scrapped

Barry Railway Class G were 0-4-4T steam tank locomotives of the Barry Railway in South Wales. They were designed by J. F. Hosgood, built by both Vulcan Foundry and Sharp Stewart and were introduced in 1892. Initially used for the Barry to Cardiff suburban service, they were transferred to passenger duties on the main line between Barry and Porth as well as the service between Pontypridd Graig and Cardiff Clarence Road, once the 'J' class had displaced them on the Barry to Cardiff run. The company insisted that their passenger locomotives should be smartly turned out and the 'G' class was no exception. The locomotives passed to the Great Western Railway in 1922 and were all scrapped by 1929.

== Numbering ==
Year	Quantity	Manufacturer	Serial numbers	Barry Numbers	GWR Numbers	Notes
1892	2	Vulcan Foundry	1348–1349	66–67	2, 3	67 didn't have a copper capped chimney (all other class members did) and it had splashers on the trailing wheels
1895	2	Sharp Stewart	4053–4054	68–69	4, 9	
