= GWR 56 Class =

Class of British steam locomotives

Type and origin
- Power type: Steam
- Designer: Joseph Armstrong
- Builder: GWR Swindon Works
- Order number: Lots 27, 29
- Serial number: 351, 392–401
- Build date: 1871–1872
- Total produced: 11
Specifications
- Configuration
  - Whyte: 2-4-0
- Gauge: 4 ft 8 1/2 in (1,435 mm) standard gauge
- Driver dia.: 6 ft 0 in (1.829 m)
- Fuel type: Coal
- Cylinders: two
Career
- Operators: GWR
- Withdrawn: 1903–1919
- Disposition: All scrapped

The GWR 56 Class were 2-4-0 tender locomotives designed for the Great Western Railway by Joseph Armstrong and built at Swindon Works between 1871 and 1872.

== Design and construction ==
There were 11 engines in the class, of which the prototype, No. 56 itself, was built in 1871; the remaining ten were numbered 717–726 and appeared the following year. They were built on Lot numbers 27 and 29 respectively. They were larger and longer than Armstrong's 439 and 481 classes, and the original boilers were of the type used for his goods engines. The driving wheels were 6 ft 0 in (1.829 m) in diameter.

== Use ==
Ahrons states that Nos. 56, 717, 719, 720 and 724 were allocated for 20 years to Weymouth, and that the rest were at Bordesley for even longer, hauling trains to Chester and Hereford. All ran more than a million miles, and they were withdrawn between 1903 and 1919.

== Accident ==
On 12 November 1894, locomotive No. 720 was hauling a boat train that was derailed at Yetminster, Dorset due to flood damaged track.

== Sources ==
- Allcock, N. J.; Davies, F. K.; le Fleming, H. M.; Maskelyne, J. N.; Reed, P. J. T.; Tabor, F. J. (1968) [1951]. White, D. E. (ed.). The Locomotives of the Great Western Railway, part one: Preliminary Survey. Kenilworth: RCTS.
- Earnshaw, Alan (1990). Trains in Trouble: Vol. 6. Penryn: Atlantic Books. ISBN 0-906899-37-0.
- Tabor, F. J. (February 1956). White, D. E. (ed.). The Locomotives of the Great Western Railway, part four: Six-wheeled Tender Engines. Kenilworth: RCTS.
