= GWR 1813 Class =

Class of British steam locomotives

Type and origin
- Power type: Steam
- Designer: William Dean
- Builder: GWR Swindon Works
- Order number: Lots 59, 60
- Serial number: 906–945
- Build date: 1882-1884
- Total produced: 40
Specifications
- Configuration
  - Whyte: 0-6-0T
- Gauge: 4 ft 8 1/2 in (1,435 mm) standard gauge
- Driver dia.: 4 ft 6 in (1.372 m)
- Wheelbase: 15 ft 6 in (4.72 m)
- Fuel type: Coal
- Cylinders: two
- Cylinder size: 17 in × 24 in (432 mm × 610 mm)
Career
- Operators: Great Western Railway; British Railways
- Retired: 1937–1949
- Disposition: All scrapped

The Great Western Railway's 1813 Class was a series of 40 0-6-0T built at Swindon Works in two lots of 20 engines each. No. 1813 was sold to the Pembroke & Tenby Railway in May 1883 becoming No.7 Holmwood, retaining this name after being absorbed by the GWR. Nearly all of these engines spent their lives on the GWR's Southern Division.

== Construction ==
Table of orders and numbers
Year	Quantity	Lot No.	Works Nos.	Locomotive numbers	Notes
1882–83	20	59	906–925	1813–1832	
1883–84	20	60	926–945	1834–1853	

The "missing" number 1833 was also an 0-6-0T built in 1882, but not of this class – it was one of Dean's experimental locomotives, being of a different design.

== Design ==
This was the first 0-6-0T design of William Dean and in its concept and dimensions may be regarded as the precursor of all the larger GWR pannier tanks of the 20th century, such as the 5700 and 9400 classes:

- Inside frames
- Wheels 4 ft 6 in (1.372 m) diameter, wheelbase 15 ft 6 in (4.72 m)
- Cylinders 17 in × 24 in (432 mm × 610 mm)

As built, they had domeless boilers with round-top fireboxes, and side tanks.

== Rebuilding ==
=== Tanks ===
Between 1894 and 1906 all but two (nos. 1817/53) of the 1813s were rebuilt with saddle tanks, and between 1903 and 1906, five were rebuilt with either short or full-length pannier tanks, resulting in a very early example of this type of engine. All but one (no. 1829) of the rest were so converted between 1911 and 1927, as had become standard practice on the Great Western.

=== Boilers ===
The class also carried an unusually wide variety of different boilers. With one exception (no. 1817) all of the original domeless boilers were replaced by domed boilers with round-top fireboxes between 1894 and 1902, and these were of two principal types: most had their domes on the front half of the boiler barrel, but some had the dome on the rear half of the barrel. Several locomotives were fitted with both types at different times.

No. 1817 had its domeless boiler replaced by a domed boiler having a Belpaire firebox in 1904, and from 1905 onwards, all but two (nos. 1825/9) of the others had their domed round-top boilers replaced by domed Belpaire boilers. Although the round-top type continued to be fitted, there were no reversions from Belpaire to round-top. As with the round-top boilers, the dome could be either on the front half or the rear half of the boiler barrel, but only nos. 1816/43 had the dome at the front, and both were subsequently given replacement boilers having domes on the rear half. The last conversion from round-top to Belpaire occurred in 1927.

Beginning in 1915, thirty of the locomotives were provided with superheaters, in several cases this occurred when the locomotive was also rebuilt from round-top to Belpaire. All of the superheated boilers had Belpaire fireboxes with the dome mounted on the rear half of the boiler barrel. Just over half of the superheater conversions subsequently reverted to using saturated steam.

== Withdrawal ==
Withdrawal commenced in May 1928. Most of the class were withdrawn over the next eleven years, leaving six (nos. 1823/31/5/8/46/7) still in service at the outbreak of World War II. Five of these were withdrawn between 1944 and 1947, leaving one (No. 1835) which alone passed into British Railways stock, to be withdrawn in January 1949.
