= Pitchford (surname) =

Pitchford is a small village and civil parish in the English county of Shropshire. It is also a surname. Notable people with the surname include:

- Christopher Pitchford (1947–2017), British judge
- Dean Pitchford (born 1951), American songwriter, screenwriter, director, actor, and novelist
- Denys Watkins-Pitchford (1905–1990), English naturalist, illustrator, and writer
- Frank Pitchford (c.1935–1990), English rugby league player
- Geoff Pitchford (born 1936), British skier and Olympics competitor
- Harry Pitchford (1891–1965), English cricketer
- Herbert Watkins-Pitchford (1868–1951), British veterinarian
- John H. Pitchford (1857–1923), American attorney and judge
- Larry Pitchford (born 1936), American wrestler and musician
- Leanne Pitchford, American and French plasma physicist
- Len Pitchford (1900–1992), English cricketer
- Liam Pitchford (born 1993), English table tennis player and Olympics competitor
- Lonnie Pitchford (1955–1998), American blues guitarist, singer, and instrument maker
- Max Pitchford (1903–1968), Australian rules footballer
- Randy Pitchford (born 1971), American video game producer
- Richard Valentine Pitchford (1895–1973), British magician
- Steve Pitchford (born 1952), English rugby league player
- Thomas J. Pitchford, state senator in North Carolina
- Walter Pitchford (born 1992), American basketball player

== See also ==
- Pickford (disambiguation)
- Pitchford (disambiguation)
