= GWR 4900 Class 4936 Kinlet Hall =

Preserved British 4-6-0 locomotive

4936 Kinlet Hall
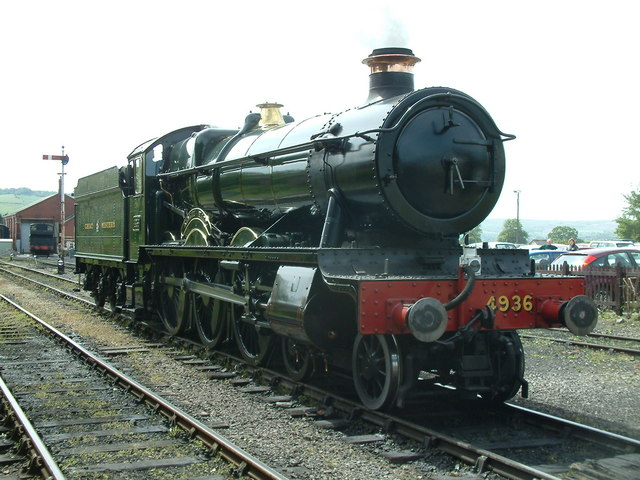
- 4936 Kinlet Hall at Toddington Station in 2005
Type and origin
- Power type: Steam
- Designer: Charles Collett
- Builder: Great Western Railway
- Build date: June 1929
Specifications
- Configuration
  - Whyte: 4-6-0
  - UIC: 2′C h2
- Gauge: 4 ft 8 1/2 in (1,435 mm) standard gauge
- Leading dia.: 3 ft 0 in (0.914 m)
- Driver dia.: 6 ft 0 in (1.829 m)
- Minimum curve: 8 chains (528 ft; 161 m) normal, 7 chains (462 ft; 141 m) slow
- Length: 63 ft 0 1/4 in (19.21 m) over buffers
- Width: 8 ft 11 1/4 in (2.724 m)
- Height: 13 ft 3 1/4 in (4.045 m)
- Axle load: 18 long tons 19 cwt (42,400 lb or 19.3 t) (21.2 short tons)
- Adhesive weight: 57 long tons 0 cwt (127,700 lb or 57.9 t) (63.8 short tons)
- Loco weight: 75 long tons 0 cwt (168,000 lb or 76.2 t) (84.0 short tons)
- Tender weight: 46 long tons 14 cwt (104,600 lb or 47.4 t) (52.3 short tons)
- Fuel type: Coal
- Cylinders: Two, outside
Career
- Operators: Vintage Trains
- Class: 4900 Hall Class
- Numbers: 4936
- Retired: January 1964
- Restored: 2000
- Disposition: Operational

The Great Western Railway (GWR) steam locomotive No. 4936 Kinlet Hall is a preserved Hall class 4-6-0 steam locomotive.

== Operation ==
Kinlet Hall was built in June 1929 at Swindon Works, at a cost of £5,209, and was first allocated to Chester. The locomotive first worked with a 3500-gallon tender, but this was changed for a 4000-gallon tender in 1938.

In 1941, it ran into a bomb crater after a bombing raid at Plymouth, and was severely damaged.

In 1955, the locomotive was fitted with manganese steel liners (rather than the usual bronze liners) to the main axle boxes. This was unique among GWR locomotives.

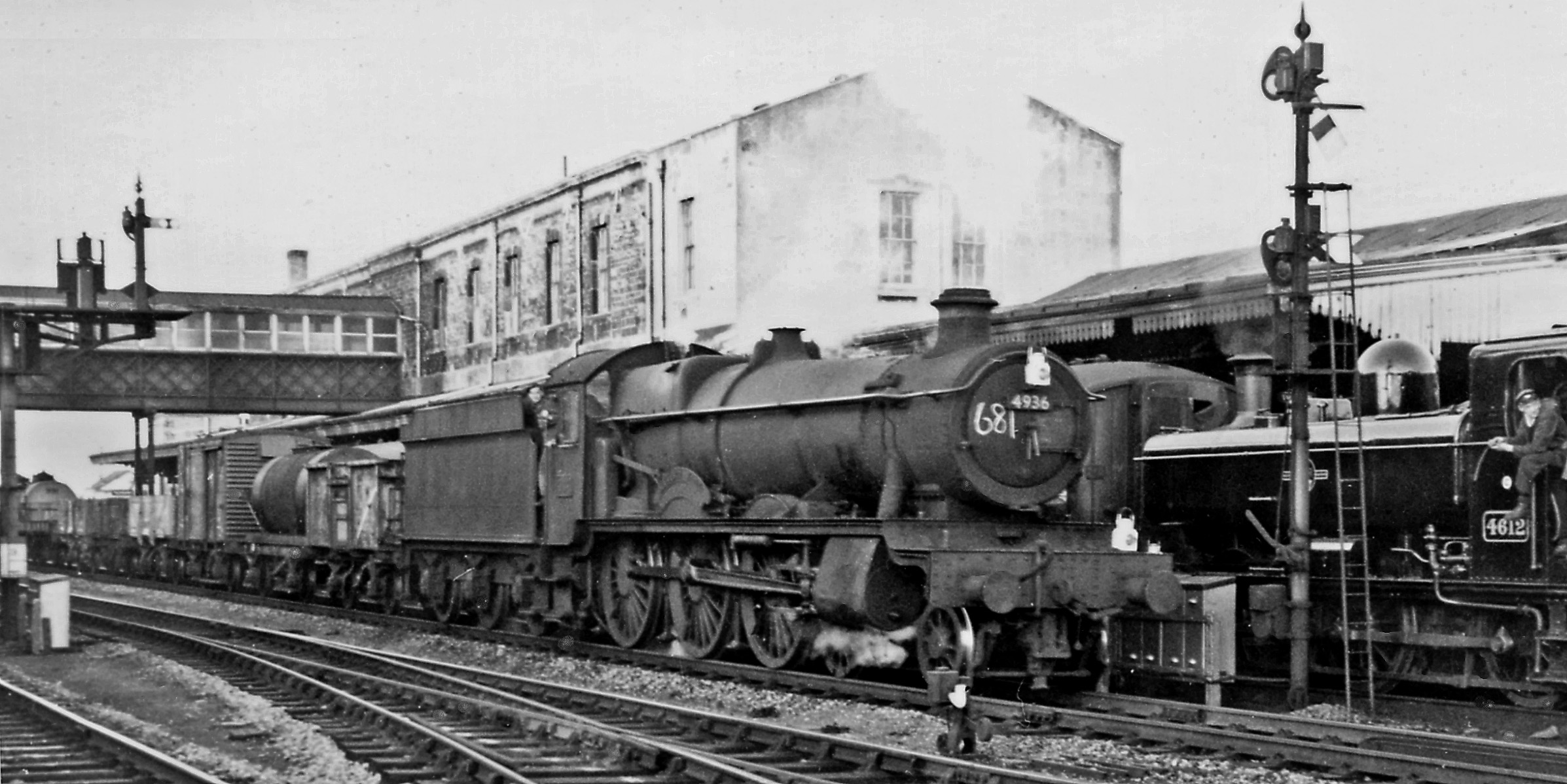
Kinlet Hall working a freight train at Swindon in 1958

At various times, the locomotive was allocated to Cardiff Canton, Laira, Old Oak Common, Oswestry, Oxley, Oxford, Shrewsbury, Stafford Road, Swindon, Truro, and finally Cardiff East Dock.

After completing more than one million miles (1,600,000 km) in service, Kinlet Hall was withdrawn from service with British Railways in January 1964 and sold for scrap to Woodham Brothers scrapyard in Barry, South Wales in June 1964.

== Preservation ==
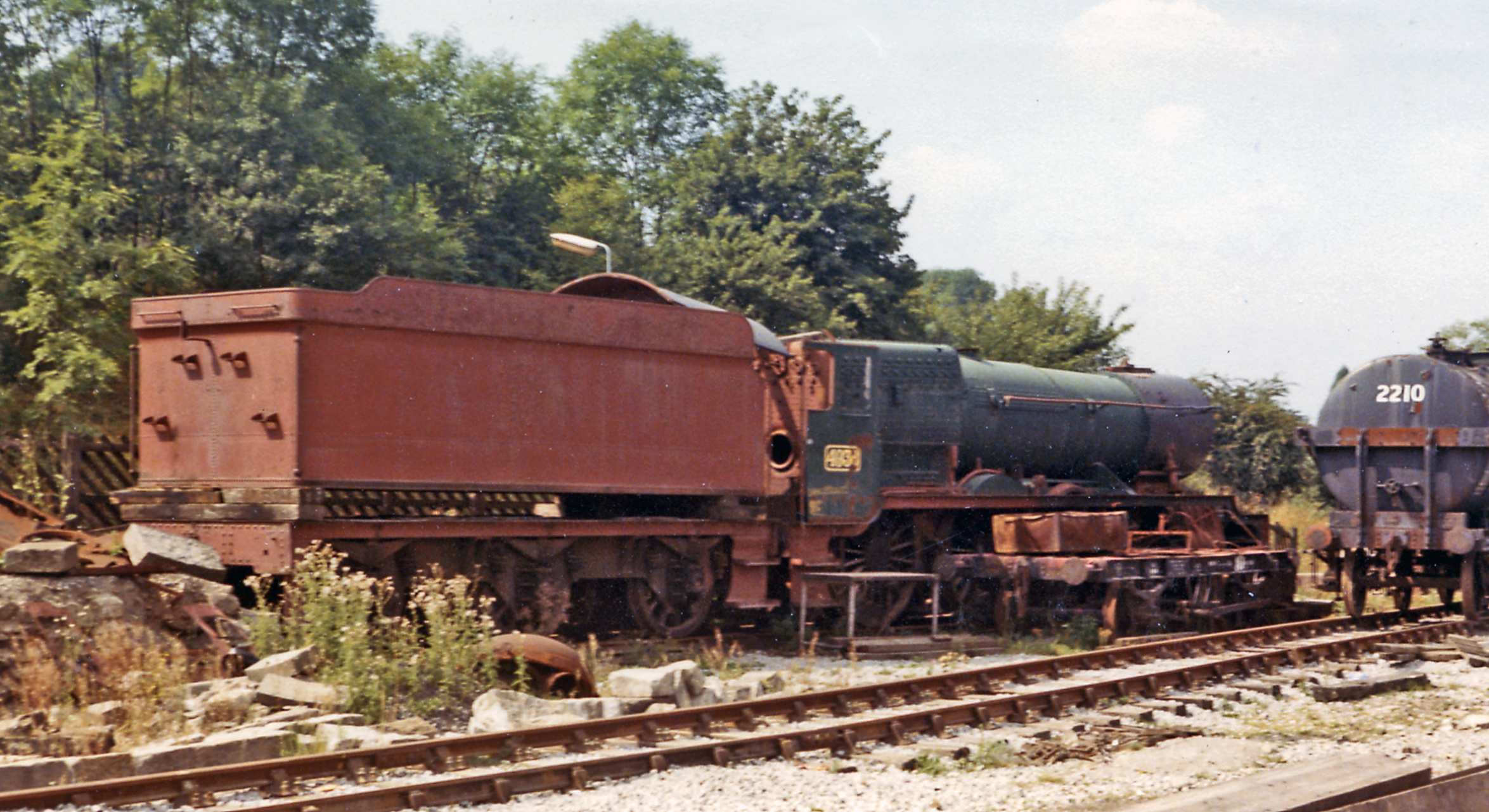
Kinlet Hall under restoration in 1983

In 1981 it was bought by the Kinlet Hall Locomotive Company and moved to Peak Rail at Matlock where restoration work began. It was moved to the Gloucestershire Warwickshire Railway in 1985, followed by the Llangollen Railway in 1992. In 1996 it was moved to Tyseley Locomotive Works for final restoration.

The locomotive returned to operational condition in February 2000 and, following certification for mainline operation, it made several mainline trips to various parts of the country, sometimes in company with fellow Tyseley resident 4965 Rood Ashton Hall. The inaugural trip in question was Vintage Trains' SLS Special from Birmingham Snow Hill to Didcot on 17 June 2000. It visited the West Somerset Railway Jubilee gala 2001. It has since visited several of its former homes in preservation, returning to Llangollen in June 2001, and the Gloucestershire Warwickshire Railway for much of the 2004/2005 operating season.

In 2006 it was fitted with the On-Train Monitoring Recorder (OTMR) equipment at Tyseley, and a full retube was undertaken during the first part of 2007. Between October 2007 and March 2008 the engine visited the East Lancashire Railway. The fitting of OTMR has allowed it to provide motive power for various mainline excursions, including Vintage Trains' Shakespeare Express and the Three Choirs Express excursion, double-heading with 5029 Nunney Castle.

After attending West Somerset Railway Spring Steam Gala 2009, visiting the Severn Valley Railway for summer 2009, and being displayed at the Tyseley Open Day on 25 October 2009, it was dismantled over the winter for a thorough overhaul, which was completed in around 20 months. The engine was on display at the Tyseley Open Days on 25–26 June 2011, and test running on the mainline commenced shortly afterwards. The locomotive visited the North Norfolk Railway in March 2012, before visiting the Dartmouth Steam Railway between June and October 2012, hauling regular service trains on the line alongside the railway's own fleet of locomotives, and also attended the Nene Valley Railway in September. It then moved to the West Somerset Railway in October 2012 via the mainline. The locomotive spent 2013 hauling railtours on the mainline, before going on loan to the Severn Valley again, from September 2013 to late March 2014.

After reaching an operational agreement it spent the 2014 season on the West Somerset Railway, including the Autumn Gala. It was then agreed that it would remain at the West Somerset Railway during 2015, although a planned visit to the North Yorkshire Moors Railway for that line's Spring Steam Gala in April didn't occur. In April 2015 it was announced that Kinlet Hall Ltd and WSR plc had agreed a five-year residency period for the locomotive, to be based at Minehead. The agreement allowed for periods of both mainline running and visits to other preserved railways events.

In summer 2016 it was announced that the firebox brick arch had been found to be broken beyond repair. This caused firebox and boiler damage, and as a result the mainline certificate was withdrawn. Faced with a period of limited running and no mainline income, director Jon Jones-Pratt agreed to buy out the other shareholders and pay for a full mainline certified overhaul. The engine ran on the WSR until autumn 2016, then moved back to Tyseley Locomotive Works for a complete overhaul. Jon Jones-Pratt then died suddenly in October 2026 at age 42, at the time of his death the boiler of the locomotive was still at Tyseley Locomotive Works with the frames back at the West Somerset Railway, it has not yet been publicly confirmed what will happen to the locomotive following the overhaul or if the overhaul is still in progress, according to a post on Steam Locomotive Info in August 2026 it had been nearing completion of its overhaul however and plans were in place for it to run on the West Somerset Railway when completed.

== Models ==
In 2005 Bachmann produced an OO gauge model of Kinlet Hall in GWR green with crest.

In 2008 Lionel, LLC produced an O gauge train set (Lionel Shakespeare Express "Kinlet Hall" Passenger Set) comprising Kinlet Hall and three GWR coaches.
