= Class 101 =

Class 101 is the name given to several types of railway locomotive:

- GWR 101 Class, a British steam locomotive (of which only one was produced)
- British Rail Class 101, a British diesel multiple unit
- CIE Class 101, an Irish diesel locomotive
- DBAG Class 101, a German electric locomotive
- GS&WR Class 101, an Irish steam locomotive
- NIR Class 101, a Northern Irish diesel locomotive
