= Wootton Hall =

Wootton Hall may refer to

- Wootton Hall, a house in Wootton Wawen
- GWR 4900 Class 4979 Wootton Hall, a preserved steam locomotive
