= Pitchford (disambiguation) =

Pitchford is a small village and civil parish in the English county of Shropshire. It may also refer to:

- GWR 4900 Class 4953 Pitchford Hall (built 1929), a railway steam locomotive
- Pitchford Hall (erected c.1560), a large Grade I listed Tudor country house in the village of Pitchford
- Pitchford (surname), people with this surname
- Pitchford Thesis [see: current account (balance of payments)], used in economics
