= GWR 4900 Class 5967 Bickmarsh Hall =

Preserved British steam locomotive

Bickmarsh Hall
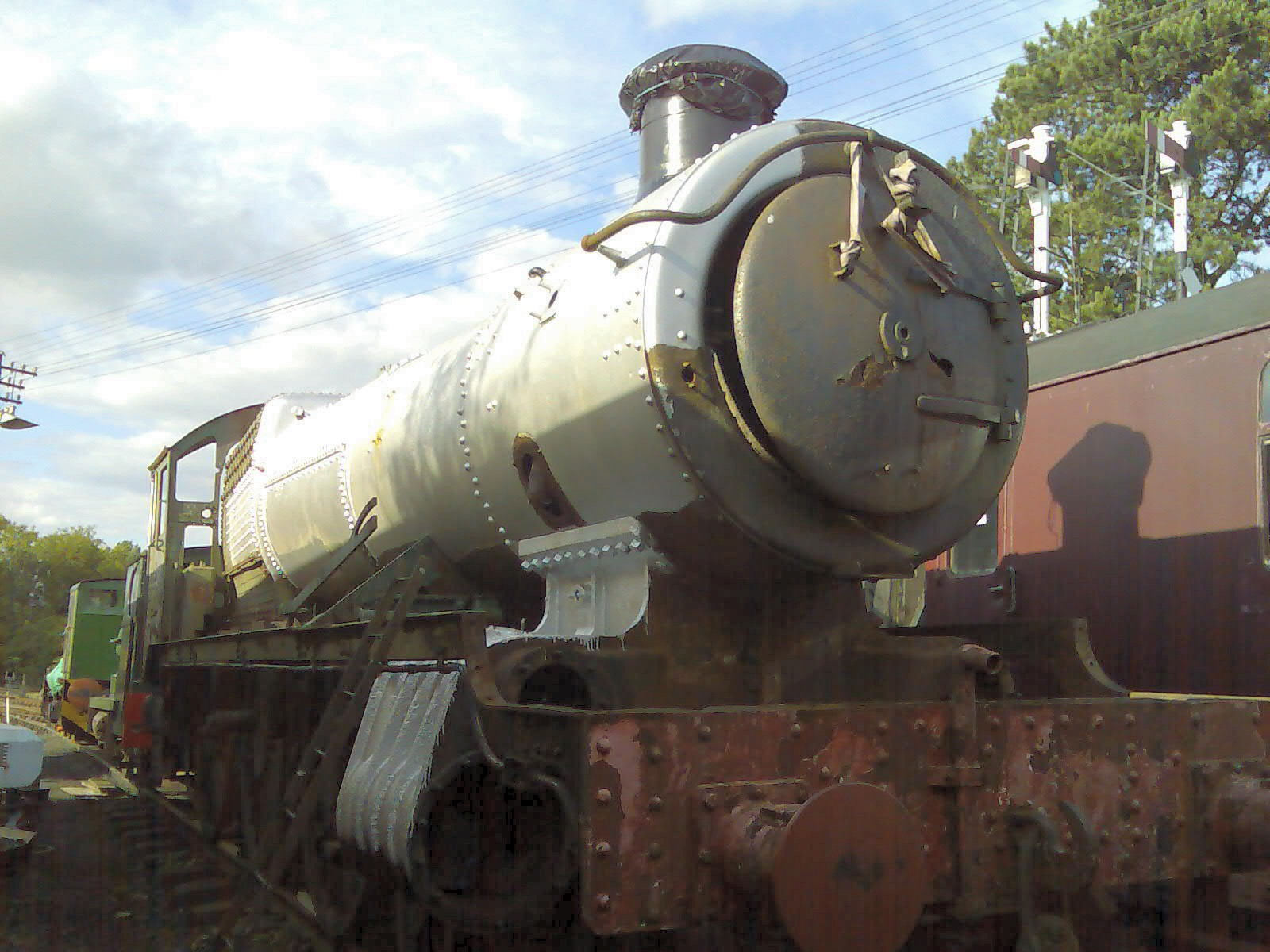
- 5967 Bickmarsh Hall under restoration at Northampton & Lamport Railway
Type and origin
- Power type: Steam
- Builder: Great Western Railway, Swindon
- Build date: March 1937
Specifications
- Configuration
  - Whyte: 4-6-0
- Gauge: 4 ft 8 1/2 in (1,435 mm) standard gauge
- Driver dia.: 6 ft 0 in (1.829 m)
- Fuel type: Coal
- Boiler pressure: 225 psi (1,550 kPa)
- Cylinders: Two, outside
Performance figures
- Tractive effort: 27,275 lbf (121,330 N)
Career
- Operators: Great Western Railway; British Railways
- Class: 4900 'Hall' Class
- Numbers: 5967
- Official name: Bickmarsh Hall
- Withdrawn: June 1964
- Disposition: Undergoing restoration to operating condition

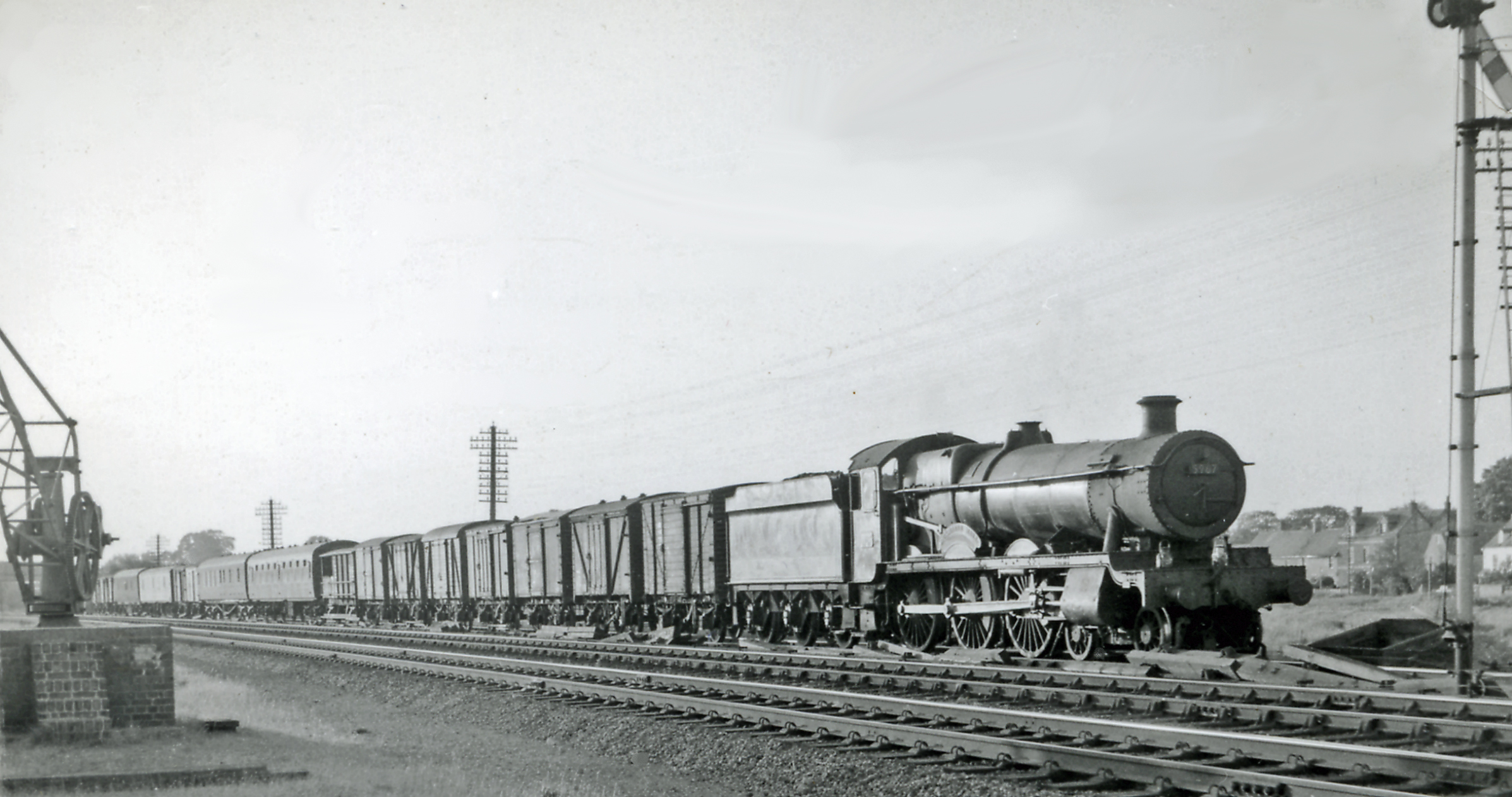
5967 in service on a parcels train at Wolvercote Junction.

No. 5967 Bickmarsh Hall is a Hall class 4-6-0 steam locomotive, it was built at Swindon railway works, and was completed in March 1937. First allocated to Chester, in August 1950 it was allocated to Banbury, and then in March 1959 to Newton Abbot. Fitted with a boiler from a Modified Hall with 3 row superheater during its last overhaul at Swindon in 1961, it was then given its last allocation to Westbury.

Withdrawn in June 1964 it was sold to Woodham Brothers scrapyard in Barry, South Wales, where Bickmarsh Hall stayed until it was bought by the Pontypool and Blaenavon Railway. The locomotive left as the 187th departure from the scrapyard, in August 1987. Currently paired with 4,000-imperial-gallon (18,000 L; 4,800 US gal) Collett tender number 2910, it is preserved at the Northampton & Lamport Railway where it is undergoing a slow restoration. Moved to the Llangollen Railway for restoration to continue in 2024.

The restoration of 5967 will see the extension frames and cylinder block from classmate No. 4942 'Maindy Hall' be used due to these parts not being needed when 4942 was rebuilt into GWR 2900 Class No. 2999 'Lady of Legend'. 5967 is expected to be back on its wheels at the end of 2026. Although the firebox is in useable condition, the boiler still needs restoring with a new smokebox, barrel and backhead as well as a new tender and tank.
