= GWR oil burning steam locomotives =

The Great Western Railway (GWR) experimented with oil burning steam locomotives at two points in its history. A single experimental tank engine was constructed to burn oil in 1902, and 37 engines of four different classes were converted to burn oil between 1946 and 1950. Neither experiment resulted in the long-term use of oil as fuel for steam locomotives. A single pannier tank locomotive was also converted under British Rail in 1958.

== No. 101 of 1902 ==
GWR No. 101 was an experimental 0-4-0 side-tank locomotive built at Swindon Works under the direction of Churchward in June 1902. Initially built as an oil-burning locomotive, it was rebuilt in 1905 as a coal burner, with the cab backplate replaced by a bunker. No further engines were built to this design, and the locomotive was withdrawn and scrapped in 1911.

== Oil burning after WWII ==
GWR locomotives had been designed to take advantage of high quality Welsh steam coal. Following the end of World War II, coal supplies were scarce and of poor quality as the best coal was exported. GWR CME Hawksworth tried using oil as a fuel in steam locomotives. He modified a number of locomotives of different classes, and the results were successful enough that it was planned to turn Cornwall into an oil fired area. The Government decided that such a scheme should be extended across the country, and asked Hawksworth to provide details of the technology to other railway companies. Several million pounds were spent on the scheme before it foundered on the uneconomic cost of the imported fuel, which had to be purchased using scarce foreign exchange. All the locomotives involved were reconverted to burn coal.

In 1946, one Hall class and one Castle class 4-6-0, and several 2800 class 2-8-0 engines working in South Wales were modified. Plans to convert some 4200 class 2-8-0T tank engines were not carried out. The fireboxes were modified by replacing the firebars with a plate that had openings for the air supply, lining part of the firebox with high alumina firebrick to cope with the change in combustion, and mounting a single burner at the front of the firebox that directed the oil, atomized by steam, upwards towards the back of the firebox. Initial problems with the burner saw them replaced by the Laidlaw-Drew type. Tenders were altered to hold a 1,800 imp gal (8,200 L) tank for oil, with steam heating coils to make the heavy grade of oil used thin enough to flow. The success of the initial conversion saw the scheme extended to further Castle and Hall class locomotives, for work in Cornwall.

Oil burners had their own maintenance requirements, including the daily removal and cleaning of the atomizers to keep them effective. Overall, though, they were easier for the firemen to maintain and run than coal fired engines. Depots were re-equipped for refuelling the engines at Bristol Bath Road, Bristol St Philip's Marsh, Cardiff Canton, Didcot, Gloucester, Llanelly, Newport Ebbw Junction, Newton Abbot, Old Oak Common, Plymouth Laira, Reading, Severn Tunnel Junction, Swindon, and Westbury. Work at Banbury and Swansea was cancelled before completion.

A total of thirty-seven locomotives were converted to burn oil, starting with No. 5955 Garth Hall in June 1946 and continuing into the next year. Some locomotives carried new numbers while they were oil burners. Reconversion to coal firing started in September 1948, and was complete by April 1950. Renumbered engines went back to their old numbers.

=== Locomotives converted ===
- Five 4073 Castle Class locomotives were converted, retaining their current numbers.
- Eleven 4900 Hall Class locos were converted, and renumbered into the 3900 range.
- Twelve 2800 Class 2-8-0s and eight of the 2884 Class were converted, and renumbered into the 4800 range. To make way for these, all the 4800 Class 0-4-2Ts were renumbered to the 1400 range.
- One 4300 Class 2-6-0 was converted, retaining its number.

All engines were converted back to coal firing by 1950, and regained their original numbers. However, the 1400s were never renumbered back to 4800s.

List of locomotives converted
Class	Original number	Oil burner number	Date converted	Date reverted	Name
2800	2832	4806	Nov 1946	Apr 1949	
2800	2834	4808	Jul 1947	Jan 1950	
2800	2839	4804	Nov 1946	Oct 1948	
2800	2845	4809	Aug 1947	Dec 1949	
2800	2847	4811	Sep 1947	Jun 1949	
2800	2848	4807	Jun 1947	Jul 1949	
2800	2849	4803	Nov 1946	Apr 1949	
2800	2853	4810	Aug 1947	Jun 1949	
2800	2854	4801	Nov 1946	Feb 1949	
2800	2862	4802	Nov 1946	Sep 1948	
2800	2863	4805	Nov 1946	Mar 1949	
2800	2872	4800	Nov 1946	Sep 1948	
2884	2888	4850	Nov 1946	Sep 1948	
2884	3813	4855	Jul 1947	Jun 1949	
2884	3818	4852	Nov 1946	Sep 1948	
2884	3820	4856	Jul 1947	Jun 1949	
2884	3831	4857	Aug 1947	Mar 1949	
2884	3837	4854	Jun 1947	Aug 1949	
2884	3839	4853	Jul 1947	Nov 1949	
2884	3865	4851	Nov 1946	Apr 1949	
Castle	100A1	(Note: Not renumbered)	Jan 1947	Sep 1948	Lloyds
Castle	5039		Dec 1946	Sep 1948	Rhuddlan Castle
Castle	5079		Jan 1947	Oct 1948	Lysander
Castle	5083		Dec 1946	Nov 1948	Bath Abbey
Castle	5091		Oct 1946	Nov 1948	Cleeve Abbey
4300	6320		Mar 1947	Aug 1949	
Hall	4907	3903	May 1947	Apr 1950	Broughton Hall
Hall	4948	3902	May 1947	Sep 1948	Northwick Hall
Hall	4968	3900	May 1947	Mar 1949	Shotton Hall
Hall	4971	3901	May 1947	Apr 1949	Stanway Hall
Hall	4972	3904	May 1947	Oct 1948	Saint Brides Hall
Hall	5955	3950	Jun 1946	Oct 1948	Garth Hall
Hall	5976	3951	Apr 1947	Nov 1948	Ashwicke Hall
Hall	5986	3954	May 1947	Feb 1950	Arbury Hall
Hall	6949	3955	May 1947	Apr 1949	Haberfield Hall
Hall	6953	3953	Apr 1947	Sep 1948	Leighton Hall
Hall	6957	3952	Apr 1947	Mar 1950	Norcliffe Hall

== Pannier conversion by BR ==
In April 1958, under British Railways, GWR 5700 Class 0-6-0PT No. 3711 was converted to burn oil, with a fuel tank installed in the bunker. The conversion was done by Robert Stephenson and Hawthorns.

== Preservation conversion ==
In January 2024 Heritage Railway magazine reported that 4965 Rood Ashton Hall during its next overhaul alongside undergoing a retube and a reduction in its width for gauging reasons, consideration was being made to have 4965 converted to oil burning. In March 2024, Vintage Trains confirmed that 4965 will be converted to oil burning with its overhaul commencing in March 2024.

== See also ==
- Oil burner (engine)

== Notes and references ==
=== Sources ===
- Friends of the NRM (19 May 2022). "A brief flirtation with Oil - Firing". Friends of the NRM.
- Griffiths, Denis (1987). Locomotive engineers of the GWR. Wellingborough: Stephens. ISBN 0-85059-819-2.
- Haresnape, Brian (1976). Churchward locomotives : a pictorial history. London: Ian Allan. ISBN 0-7110-0697-0.
- Haresnape, Brian (1978). Collett & Hawksworth locomotives : a pictorial history. London: Ian Allan. ISBN 0-7110-0869-8.
- Whitehurst, Brian (1973). Great Western engines, names, numbers, types, classes: 1940 to preservation. Oxford: Oxford Pub. Co. ISBN 0-902888-21-8.
