= GWR 4900 Class =

Class of 259 two-cylinder 4-6-0 locomotives

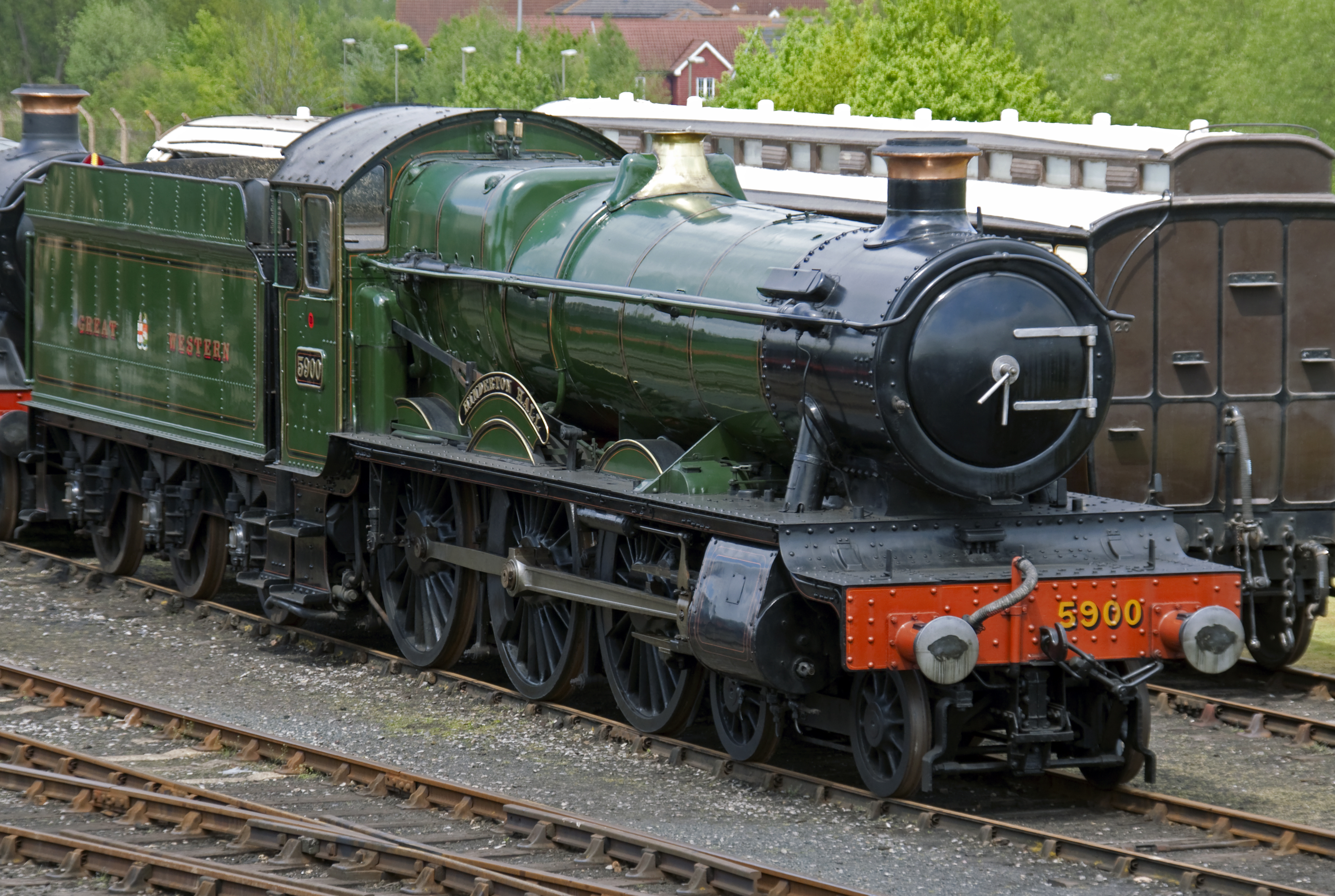
- 5900 Hinderton Hall at Didcot in 2010
Type and origin
- Power type: Steam
- Designer: Charles Collett
- Builder: GWR Swindon Works
- Order number: Lots 254, 268, 275, 281, 290, 297, 304, 311, 327, 333, 338, 340
- Build date: 1928–1943
- Total produced: 258
- Rebuilder: GWR Swindon Works
- Rebuild date: 1924
- Number rebuilt: 1 (4900 Saint Martin)
Specifications
- Configuration
  - Whyte: 4-6-0
  - UIC: 2′C h2
- Gauge: 4 ft 8 1/2 in (1,435 mm) standard gauge
- Leading dia.: 3 ft 0 in (0.914 m)
- Driver dia.: 6 ft 0 in (1.829 m)
- Minimum curve: 8 chains (528 ft; 161 m) normal, 7 chains (462 ft; 141 m) slow
- Length: 63 ft 0 1/4 in (19.21 m) over buffers
- Width: 8 ft 11 1/4 in (2.724 m)
- Height: 13 ft 3 1/4 in (4.045 m)
- Axle load: 18 long tons 19 cwt (42,400 lb or 19.3 t) (21.2 short tons)
- Adhesive weight: 57 long tons 0 cwt (127,700 lb or 57.9 t) (63.8 short tons)
- Loco weight: 75 long tons 0 cwt (168,000 lb or 76.2 t) (84.0 short tons)
- Tender weight: 46 long tons 14 cwt (104,600 lb or 47.4 t) (52.3 short tons)
- Fuel type: Coal
- Fuel capacity: Churchward tender: 7 long tons (7.1 t; 7.8 short tons); Collett/Hawksworth tender: 6 long tons (6.1 t; 6.7 short tons)
- Water cap.: Churchward tender: 3,500 imp gal (16,000 L; 4,200 US gal); Collett/Hawksworth tender: 4,000 imp gal (18,000 L; 4,800 US gal)
- Firebox
  - Grate area: 27.07 sq ft (2.515 m^{2})
- Boiler: GWR Standard No. 1
- Boiler pressure: 225 lbf/in^{2} (1,550 kPa; 15.8 kgf/cm^{2})
- Heating surface
  - Firebox: 154.78 sq ft (14.380 m^{2})
  - Tubes and flues: 1,686.60 sq ft (156.690 m^{2})
- Superheater
  - Heating area: 262.62 sq ft (24.398 m^{2})
- Cylinders: Two, outside
- Cylinder size: 18.5 in × 30 in (470 mm × 762 mm)
Performance figures
- Tractive effort: 27,275 lbf (121.33 kN)
Career
- Operators: GWR » BR
- Power class: GWR: D, BR: 5MT
- Numbers: 4900–4999, 5900–5999, 6900–6958
- Official name: Hall
- Axle load class: GWR: Red
- Withdrawn: 1941 (4911 Bowden Hall, was destroyed beyond repair during a bombing raid and then cut up), 1959–1965 (remainder)
- Preserved: 4920, 4930, 4936, 4942, 4953, 4965, 4979, 5900, 5952, 5967, 5972
- Disposition: Ten preserved or extant (two operational as of March 2021), one rebuilt as Saint class, remainder scrapped

The Great Western Railway 4900 Class or Hall Class is a class of 4-6-0 mixed-traffic steam locomotives designed by Charles Collett for the Great Western Railway. A total of 259 were built at Swindon Works, numbered 4900–4999, 5900–5999 and 6900–6958. The LMS Stanier Class 5 4-6-0 and LNER Thompson Class B1 both drew heavily on design features of the Hall Class. After nationalisation in 1948, British Railways gave them the power classification 5MT.

== Background ==
By the end of 1923 the Great Western Railway (GWR) was well served with express passenger locomotives of the Saint and Star classes and had recently introduced the Castle Class. However, the mixed-traffic 2-6-0 locomotives of the 4300 Class were beginning to struggle with the increasing loads. George Jackson Churchward had recognised this with the introduction of the 4700 class 2-8-0 with 5 ft 8 in (1.727 m) driving wheels, intended for express goods and relief passenger trains. However, Charles Collett preferred the idea of a Saint Class with smaller wheels to undertake these duties as this would provide a leading bogie. He therefore rebuilt number 2925 Saint Martin with 6 ft (1.829 m) driving wheels.

=== Prototype ===
Protoype GWR hall Saint Martin double-heading a Castle

The prototype of the new class was rebuilt in 1924 and the cylinders were realigned in relation to the driving axle and a more modern 'Castle'-type cab was fitted. Saint Martin emerged from Swindon Works in 1924 and embarked on three years of trials. During this period Collett introduced other modifications such as changing the pitch of the taper boiler and adding outside steam pipes.

== Production ==
After extensive trials during 1925–1927, Collett was satisfied with the performance of his prototype, subject to minor amendments and placed an order for eighty more with Swindon works (Lot 254) in 1928. The prototype was renumbered 4900 in December 1928 and the new locomotives were numbered 4901-80 and appeared at regular intervals until February 1930. They were named after English and Welsh country houses with 'Hall' in their titles and so became known as the 'Hall Class'.

They differed little from the prototype; the bogie wheel diameter had been reduced by two inches from 3 ft 2 in (0.965 m) to 3 ft 0 in (0.914 m) and the valve setting amended to give an increased travel of 7.5 in (191 mm). The overall weight of the locomotive had increased by 2 long tons 10 cwt (5,600 lb or 2.5 t) to 75 long tons 0 cwt (168,000 lb or 76.2 t) but a tractive effort of 27,275 lbf (121.33 kN) compared favourably with the 24,935 lbf (110.92 kN) of the 'Saint'. The original locomotives were built with Churchward 3,500 imp gal (16,000 L; 4,200 US gal) tenders but after 4958 Collett's larger 4,000 imp gal (18,000 L; 4,800 US gal) types became standard although a few later locomotives were fitted with smaller tenders if these were available as they entered service.

The first fourteen examples were despatched to the arduous proving grounds of the Cornish Main Line. They were so successful here and elsewhere on the GWR system that by the time the first production batch had been completed a further twenty were on order (Lot 268, 4981–99 and 5900). Further orders followed throughout the 1930s and early 1940s. By 1935, 150 were in service and the 259th and last Hall, No. 6958 Oxburgh Hall, was delivered in 1943. Thereafter further deliveries were of the '6959 Modified Hall' class.

Table of orders and numbers
Year	Quantity	Lot No.	Locomotive numbers	Notes
1924	1	—	4900	rebuilt from 2925 Saint Martin
1928–30	80	254	4901–4980	
1931	20	268	4981–4999, 5900	
1931	20	275	5901–5920	
1933	20	281	5921–5940	
1935	10	290	5941–5950	
1935–36	15	297	5951–5965	
1937	10	304	5966–5975	
1938	10	311	5976–5985	
1939–40	10	327	5986–5995	
1940	10	333	5996–5999, 6900–6905	
1940–41	10	338	6906–6915	
1941–43	43	340	6916–6958	

=== Oil firing ===
Eleven Hall class locomotives were converted to oil-firing in the period 1946–1950. While in this condition they were renumbered into the 3900 series. When the oil-firing was removed, they reverted to their old numbers. A proposal to convert preserved locomotive 4965 Rood Ashton Hall to oil firing was confirmed in March 2024.

== Performance ==
As indicated by their continuing production, the Hall class proved to be very successful in a variety of different roles from goods work to passenger services, although barred from several cross-country and branch lines because of their red weight classification. According to Peter Herring, 'they were the first true mixed traffic locomotives, and as such precursors of the Stanier 'Black Five', Thompson B1 and BR Standard 5MT 4-6-0.' (However, while they were forerunners of these highly successful and numerous 4-6-0 types, there were several successful 2-6-0 and 4-6-0 ‘mixed traffic’ types on the GWR and other British railways before them, - not least the GWR 4300 Class they were designed to replace.)

== Modified Hall Class ==
Although the GWR had been at the forefront of British locomotive development between 1900 and 1930, the 1930s saw a degree of complacency at Swindon reflected in the fact that the design had largely originated in the 1900s and had not fundamentally changed since the mid-1920s. Collett was replaced by Frederick Hawksworth in 1941 who created a modified version of the design, known as the Modified Hall Class. These continued to be produced by British Railways until 1950, by which time there were a further seventy-one locomotives.

== Accidents and incidents ==
- On 30 April 1941, 4911 Bowden Hall took a direct hit during a bombing raid on the Keyham area of Plymouth and was later broken up. The locomotive had stopped at a signal box because of an air raid, and the crew survived by sheltering under the steps of the signal box. 4911 was one of two GWR locomotives damaged beyond repair in Britain during World War II, the other was GWR 1854 Class No. 1729. 4936 Kinlet Hall, ran into a bomb crater in that area and was severely damaged, but was repaired.
- On 13 February 1961, 6949 Haberfield Hall was in collision with a freight train that was being shunted at Baschurch, due to a signalman's error. Three people were killed and two were injured.
- On 25 August 1962, a passenger train, hauled by a Warship class, D833 Panther, stopped at Torquay, due to the failure of the locomotive hauling it. 4932 Hatherton Hall was hauling a passenger train that overran signals and was in a rear-end collision with it. Twenty-three people were injured.

== Withdrawal ==
All but one of the original Collett Halls survived until nationalisation in 1948, the exception being 4911 Bowden Hall. Withdrawals began in 1959 with the prototype Saint Martin. Its accumulated mileage, both in its original form and rebuilt form, was a remarkable 2,092,500 miles. Further withdrawals of the production series took place during the 1960s with the final 9 members of the class being withdrawn in December 1965.

Year	Quantity in service at start of year	Quantity withdrawn	Locomotive numbers	Notes
1941	210	1	4911	Destroyed by bomb.
1959	257	2	4900/40	
1960	255	2	4901, 5915	
1961	253	8	4926/45/97, 5907/49-50, 6902/49	
1962	245	73	4906/09/12-13/17/21/25/31/34/37-38/41/44/47-48/52/57/60-61/63/65/67-69/71/73-74/77/82/84/86-87/90/95/99, 5902/06/09-13/16-18/20-21/25-26/28/30-31/35/40-41/46-47/53/59-60/64-66/68-69/73/80-82/89/96-97/99	4965 preserved.
1963	172	67	4902/04-05/07-08/10/14-15/18/22/24/27-28/30/35/39/42-43/46/53/55-56/64/66/70/75/79-81/83/91/94/96/98, 5900/03-05/08/19/23-24/29/37-38/42-45/48/54/56/70/72/77-78/85-86/93-95, 6919-20/29/38/43/48	4930, 4942, 4953, 4979, 5900, 5972 preserved.
1964	105	56	4903/16/19/23/32-33/36/49-51/54/58-59/72/76/78/85/88-89, 5901/14/22/27/34/39/51-52/57-58/62-63/67/74-76/79/87/91/98, 6900-01/05/09/12-14/25/33/36/40-42/45-46/50/54	4936, 5952, 5967 preserved.
1965	49	49	4920/29/62/92-93, 5932-33/36/55/61/71/83-84/88/90/92, 6903-04/06-08/10-11/15-18/21-24/26-28/30-32/34-35/37/39/44/47/51-53/55-58	4920 preserved.

== Preservation ==
By 1965, the last Hall had been withdrawn from the Western Region without a single example entering the National Collection. Despite this, 11 of the class did survive into preservation, all being rescued from Barry Island Scrapyard. The first member of the class to be rescued, and the 10th departure from Barry, was 4965 Rood Ashton Hall, which left in October 1970. The engine was at this point assumed to be 4983 Albert Hall, but in 1998, the restoration team at the Birmingham Railway Museum discovered its true identity to be that of 4965. The last unmodified Hall to leave Barry, and the 187th departure, was 5967 Bickmarsh Hall in August 1987.

Seven of the class have run in preservation, with all six of the UK-based engines having operated on the main line: 4930 Hagley Hall, 4936 Kinlet Hall, 4953 Pitchford Hall, 4965 Rood Ashton Hall, 5900 Hinderton Hall and 5972 Olton Hall. 5972 Olton Hall gained fame as 'Hogwarts Castle', the locomotive used in the Harry Potter film series. 4920 Dumbleton Hall has operated in preservation, but is now on static display as part of the new Harry Potter attraction which opened in Tokyo in 2023.

As of March 2024 two Halls are operational: 4930 and 4953 but neither are mainline certified. 4936 Kinlet Hall is undergoing a Network Rail standard overhaul at Tyseley Locomotive Works. In January 2024 it was announced that subject to funding for its next mainline standard overhaul 4965 Rood Ashton Hall will be converted to become oil-fired. It was confirmed in March 2024 that 4965 will be converted to oil firing during its next overhaul. On completion of its overhaul 4965 is intended to be Tyseley's primary mainline engine for their "Shakespeare Express" and "Polar Express" trains.

Of those engines which have not run in preservation, 4942 Maindy Hall has been converted back to a GWR Saint Class (2999 Lady of Legend), 4979 Wootton Hall is undergoing restoration at the Ribble Steam Railway with work currently focusing on the engine's tender, 5952 Cogan Hall is under cosmetic restoration at Tyseley Locomotive Works, with a small number of parts being used in the construction of 6880 Betton Grange and 5967 Bickmarsh Hall is undergoing restoration at the Northampton & Lamport Railway.

Number	Name	Image	Built	Withdrawn	Service life	Tender fitted	Owner	Base	Status	Livery	Mainline certified	Notes
4920	Dumbleton Hall		Mar 1929	Dec 1965	36 Years, 9 Months	Collett	West Coast Railways	Warner Brothers Studio Tours, Tokyo	Static Display	Hogwarts Railways Crimson, Hogwarts Railways Crest	No	Operational 1992-1999 Sold from SDR to new owner in December 2020. Following cosmetic makeover at Carnforth MPD, including repaint into Hogwarts Railways Crimson, was exported from Southampton to Tokyo, Japan in December 2021. On long-term loan to Warner Bros.
4930	Hagley Hall		May 1929	Dec 1963	34 Years, 7 Months	Collett	Severn Valley Railway	Severn Valley Railway	Operational	GWR Lined Green, Shirtbutton Logo	No	Hauled its inaugural passenger train on 9 September 2022 following completion of running in period.
4936	Kinlet Hall		Jun 1929	Jan 1964	34 Years, 7 Months	Collett	West Somerset Railway	Tyseley Locomotive Works.	Undergoing overhaul	BR Lined Green, Late Crest (on completion)	No (to be certified)	Undergoing mainline standard overhaul.
4942	Maindy Hall		Jul 1929	Dec 1963	34 Years, 5 Months	Churchward	Didcot Railway Centre	Didcot Railway Centre	Operational	GWR Lined Green, Great Western Lettering	No	Rebuilt into GWR 2900 Class no 2999 Lady of Legend
4953	Pitchford Hall		Aug 1929	May 1963	33 Years, 9 Months	Collett	Epping Ongar Railway	Epping Ongar Railway	Operational	BR Lined Black, Early Emblem	No	Returned to traffic in December 2019.
4965	Rood Ashton Hall		Nov 1930	Mar 1962	32 Years, 4 Months	Churchward	Vintage Trains	Tyseley Locomotive Works	Awaiting overhaul	GWR Lined Green, Great Western Lettering (on completion)	No (to be certified)	Used parts from 4983 Albert Hall, and was named Albert Hall on one side on entering service in preservation Will be converted to oil-firing during the engine's next overhaul which will commence in March 2024.
4979	Wootton Hall		Feb 1930	Dec 1963	33 Years, 10 Months	Collett	Furness Railway Trust	Ribble Steam Railway	Undergoing restoration		No	
5900	Hinderton Hall		Mar 1931	Dec 1963	32 Years, 9 Months	Collett	Didcot Railway Centre	Didcot Railway Centre	Static display	GWR Lined Green, Great Western Lettering	No	
5952	Cogan Hall		Dec 1935	Jun 1964	28 Years, 6 Months	N/A	Betton Grange Society	Tyseley Locomotive Works	Stored		No	Tender and other minor parts used on 6880 Betton Grange. Undergoing cosmetic restoration for static display at Tyseley Loco Works, full restoration to commence following the completion of 6880.
5967	Bickmarsh Hall		Mar 1937	Jun 1964	27 Years, 3 Months	N/A	Northampton & Lamport Railway	Northampton & Lamport Railway	Under restoration		No	
5972	Olton Hall		Apr 1937	Dec 1963	26 Years, 8 Months	Collett	West Coast Railways	Warner Brothers Studio Tour, London	Static display	Hogwarts Railways Crimson, Hogwarts Railways Crest	No	Renamed Hogwarts Castle for use in the Harry Potter films. Currently on lease from West Coast Railways to Warner Brothers.

== See also ==
- List of GWR standard classes with two outside cylinders
