= GWR 4900 Class 4953 Pitchford Hall =

Preserved British steam locomotive

4953 Pitchford Hall
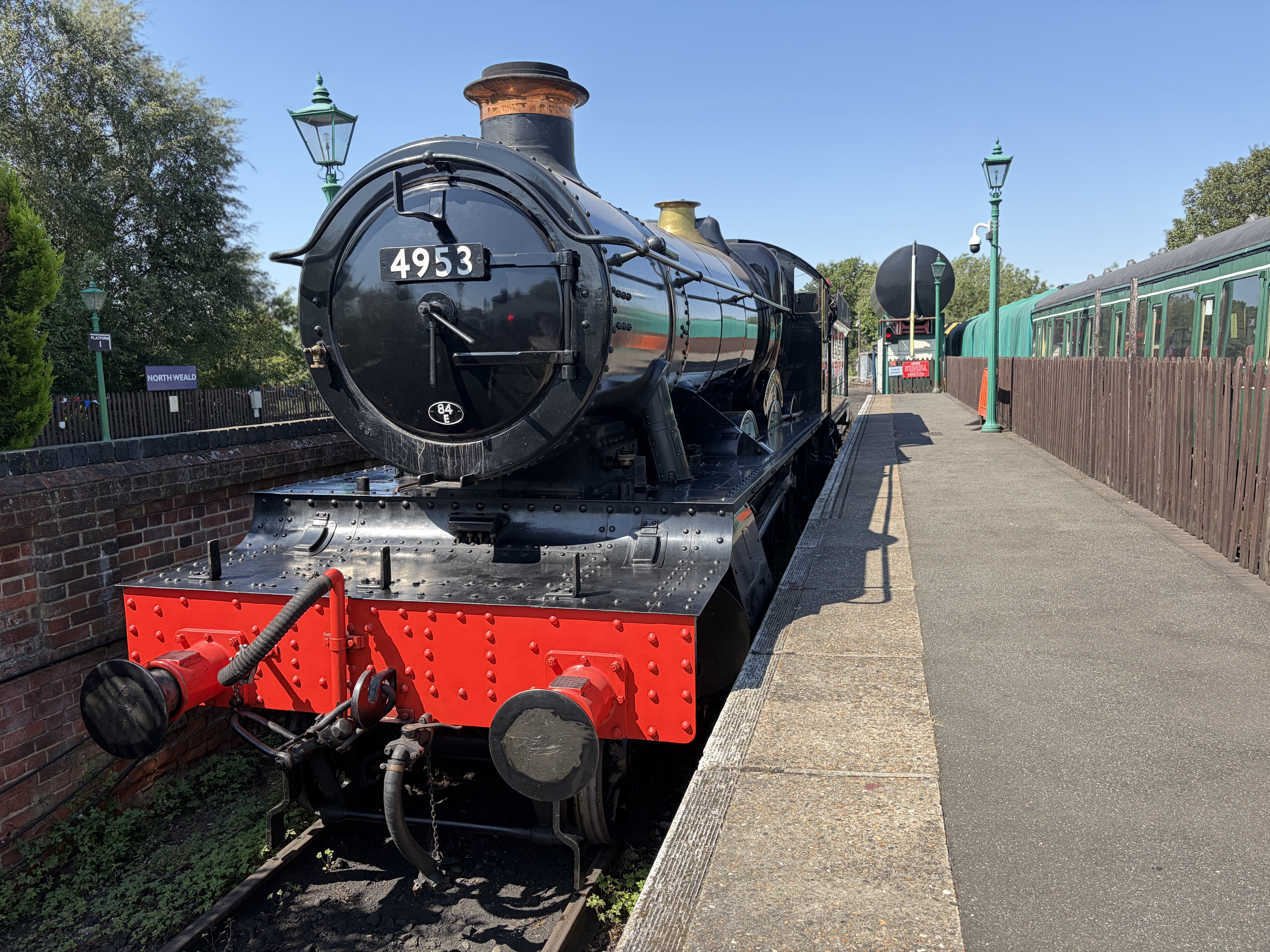
- 4953 Pitchford Hall on the Epping Ongar Railway in July 2026
Type and origin
- Power type: Steam
- Builder: Great Western Railway
- Build date: August 1929
Specifications
- Configuration
  - Whyte: 4-6-0
- Gauge: 4 ft 8 1/2 in (1,435 mm) standard gauge
- Fuel type: Coal
- Cylinders: Two, outside
Career
- Operators: Great Western Railway; British Railways
- Class: 4900 'Hall' Class
- Numbers: 4953
- Retired: May 1963
- Restored: February 2004
- Current owner: Epping Ongar Railway
- Disposition: Operational

4953 Pitchford Hall is a Hall class 4-6-0 steam locomotive built by the Great Western Railway (GWR), currently preserved at the Epping Ongar Railway.

== Operation ==
Built at Swindon Works in August 1929 for a cost of £4375, the locomotive worked from a wide variety of sheds all over the GWR network, until withdrawal by British Railways in May 1963. It covered 1,344,464 miles over that period. Acquired by Woodham Brothers scrapyard in Barry, Vale of Glamorgan, South Wales in October 1963, it was purchased by Dr John Kennedy in 1984.

== Preservation ==
Moved to Tyseley Locomotive Works, it was restored to full mainline standard, and moved under its own power once again in February 2004. It made its first public appearance in 42 years at the Crewe Great Gathering in September 2005. It obtained its mainline certification in December 2005, after making the required light and loaded test runs from Birmingham to Stratford-upon-Avon and back.

In February 2007 the locomotive attended the Keighley and Worth Valley Railway's Winter Steam Gala, and on 19 May 2007 performed in tandem with 4965 Rood Ashton Hall on a trip to Bristol from their Tyseley base. The locomotive also took part in the 2007 season Harringworth Viaduct Shuttles, and a journey from Birmingham to Kidderminster in conjunction with the Severn Valley Railway's Autumn Gala.

During 2009, it operated two Shakespeare Express services between Birmingham Snow Hill and Stratford upon Avon. On 31 August 2009, 4953 operated a railtour to Corby, via the Harringworth Viaduct. In October 2009 it ran as a light engine with 5029 Nunney Castle and support coach to the West Somerset Railway Gala, operating services between Bishops Lydeard and Minehead.

After the 2010 Tyseley Locomotive Works steam, the locomotive was moved to the Great Central Railway. It then visited the Llangollen Railway, double heading with GWR 3717 City of Truro, and operating at the West Somerset Railway before returning to Loughborough.

In 2011, after working the GCR Winter Steam Gala, it visited the Mid Hants Railway, before returning to the GCR. It was sold in late 2011 by Dr John Kennedy to the Epping Ongar Railway, though it remained at the GCR until April 2012, when it was moved to the EOR in time for the line's opening in late May 2012. The locomotive remained in service there until summer 2013 when it was withdrawn for the routine 10-year overhaul which was completed in December 2019. The locomotive is currently wearing British Railways lined black livery.
