= Thomas J. Pitchford =

American politician

Thomas Jefferson Pitchford Sr. was a state legislator in North Carolina. He represented Warren County, North Carolina in the North Carolina House of Representatives and for several terms in the North Carolina Senate. He was a Democrat. He proposed a bill to make it possible to enslave free blacks.

He served in the state senate from 1858 to 1865. He lived in Fishing Creek. He was succeeded in the state senate by Francis Alexander Thornton in 1866.

His family included sons John C. Pitchford and Thomas J. Pitchford.

He chaired the Ways and Means Committee and served on the Committee on Military Affairs.

He owned slaves.

== See also ==
- Pitchford (surname)
