= GWR 4900 Class 4920 Dumbleton Hall =

Preserved British steam locomotive

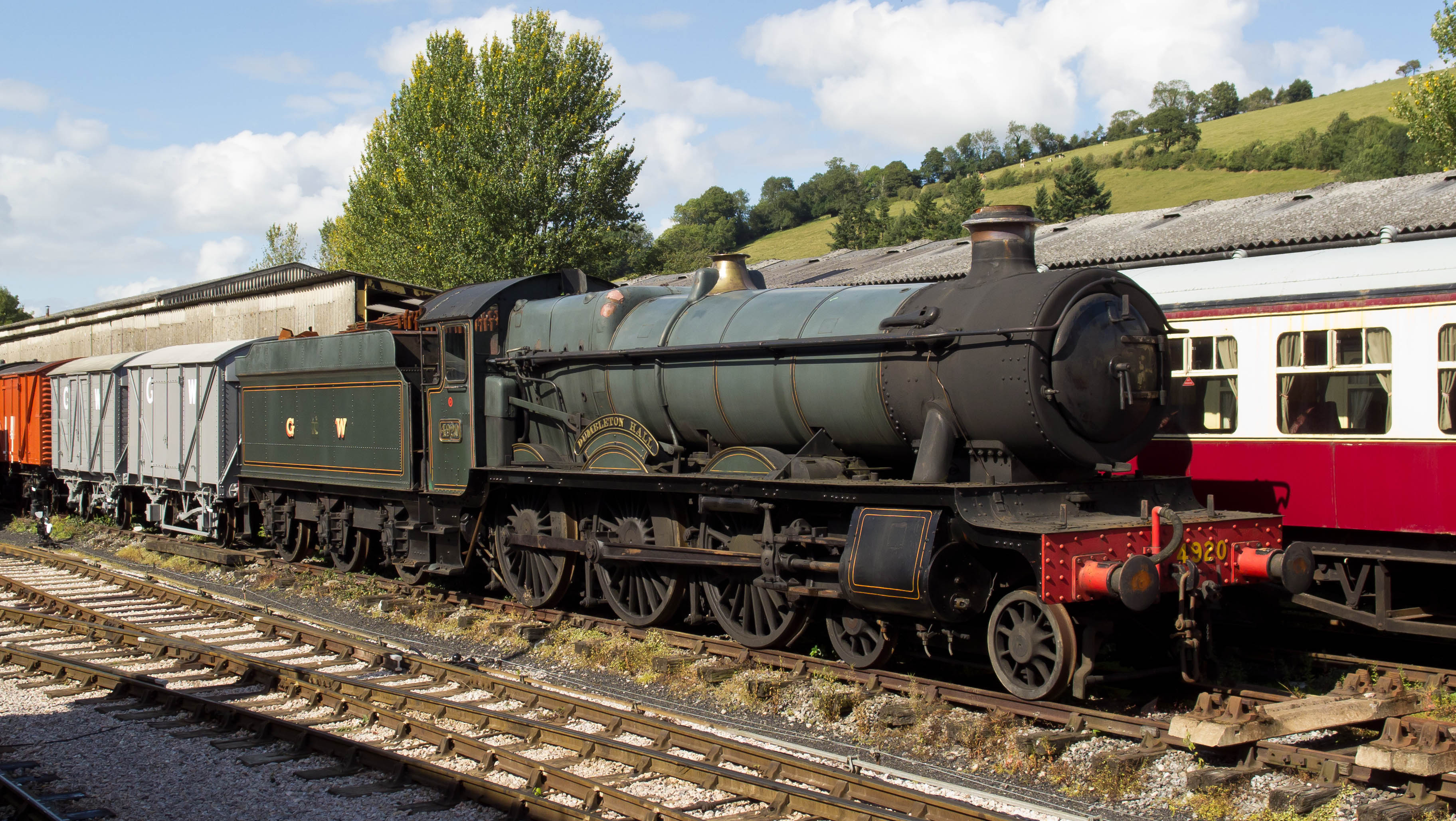
- 4920 Dumbleton Hall on the South Devon Railway in 2011
Type and origin
- Power type: Steam
- Designer: Charles Collett
- Builder: GWR Swindon Works
- Build date: March 1929
Specifications
- Configuration
  - Whyte: 4-6-0
- Gauge: 1,435 mm (4 ft 8 1/2 in)
- Loco weight: 75 tons (67 long tons; 68 t)
- Fuel type: Coal
- Cylinders: Two, outside
Career
- Operators: Great Western Railway; British Railways
- Class: Hall
- Numbers: 4920
- Official name: Dumbleton Hall
- First run: 1929
- Last run: 31 October 1999
- Withdrawn: 3 December 1965
- Restored: 1992
- Current owner: West Coast Railways
- Disposition: On static display

4920 Dumbleton Hall is a GWR 4900 Class 4-6-0 steam locomotive, built by the Great Western Railway's Swindon Works in March 1929. Named after Dumbleton Hall, its first shed allocation was at Old Oak Common. In August 1950, the next shed allocation was Reading, and in March 1959 it was allocated to Newton Abbot. The locomotive's last shed allocation was Bristol Barrow Road. It was withdrawn from British Railways service in December 1965 and sold to Woodham Brothers scrapyard in Barry, Wales.

It was purchased by the Dumbleton Hall Preservation Society, and left as the 82nd departure from Barry in June 1976 before being fully restored in 1992 for service on the Dartmouth Steam Railway. Meanwhile, the DHPS was used to purchase the Dart Valley Branch after this was put up for sale by its owners, which saw the DVR become the South Devon Railway and DHPS become the South Devon Railway Trust - with the original DHPS shareholders maintaining their ownership.

After spells on loan to the West Somerset Railway, Nene Valley Railway and Gloucestershire Warwickshire Railway, 4920 returned to the Dartmouth Steam Railway and was last steamed in October 1999.

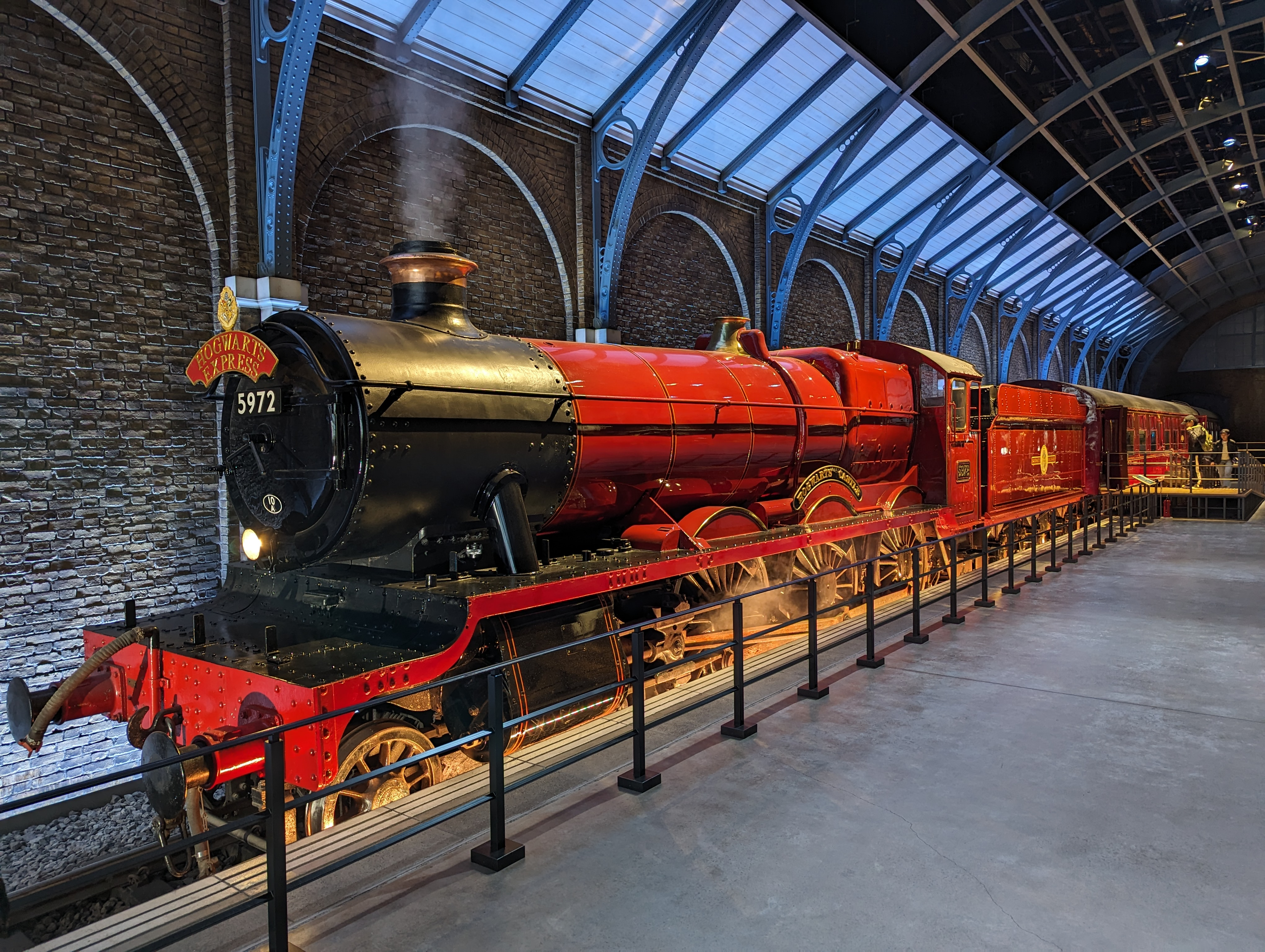
Dumbleton Hall repainted as the Hogwarts Express on display at Warner Bros Studio Tour Tokyo

It was subsequently stored out of use at Buckfastleigh on the South Devon Railway, awaiting overhaul. In December 2020 it was sold to a new owner. In February 2021 it moved to Carnforth for cosmetic restoration by West Coast Railways. It is on long-term loan to Warner Bros. In December 2021 it was exported from Southampton to Japan where it will form part of a Harry Potter static exhibit at Warner Bros Studio Tour in Tokyo.
