= GWR 2900 Class 2999 Lady of Legend =

English new build 4-6-0 steam locomotive

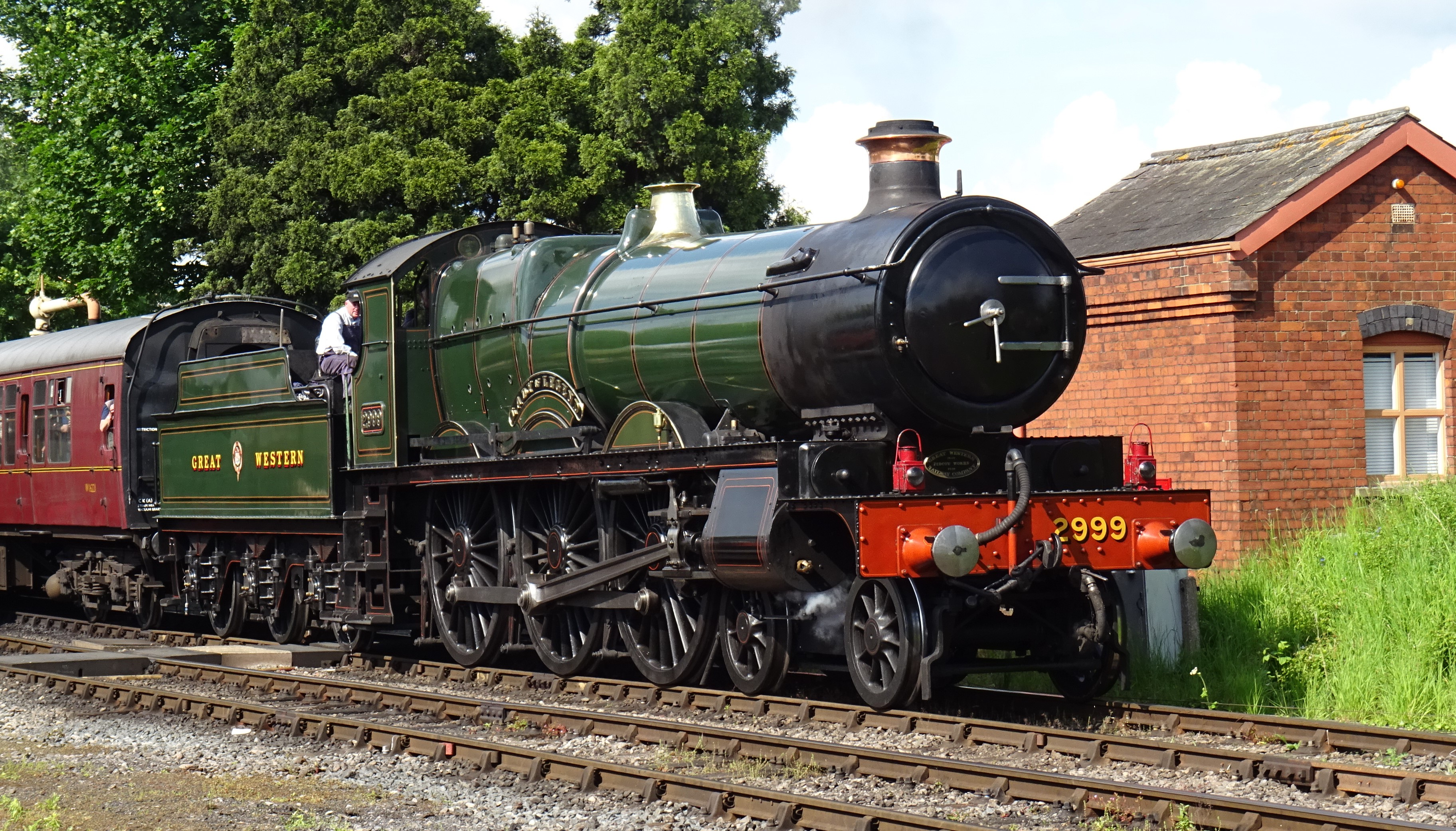
- Lady of Legend in May 2024
Type and origin
- Power type: Steam
- Designer: George Jackson Churchward
- Builder: The Saint Project
- Build date: 5 April 2019
Specifications
- Configuration
  - Whyte: 4-6-0
- Gauge: 4 ft 8 1/2 in (1,435 mm) standard gauge
- Leading dia.: 3 ft 2 in (0.965 m)
- Driver dia.: 6 ft 8 1/2 in (2.045 m)
- Length: 63 ft 0 1/4 in (19.21 m)
- Width: 8 ft 11 in (2.718 m)
- Height: 13 ft 3 1/2 in (4.051 m)
- Axle load: 18 long tons (18 t; 20 short tons)
- Loco weight: 68.30 long tons (69.40 t; 76.50 short tons)
- Tender weight: 43.15 long tons (43.84 t; 48.33 short tons)
- Fuel type: Coal
- Fuel capacity: 5 long tons (5.1 t; 5.6 short tons)
- Water cap.: 3,500 imp gal (16,000 L; 4,200 US gal)
- Firebox
  - Grate area: 27.22 sq ft (2.529 m^{2})
- Boiler: GWR Standard No. 1 (with variations)
- Boiler pressure: 225 psi (1.55 MPa) (production series)
- Heating surface
  - Firebox: 154.94 sq ft (14.394 m^{2})
  - Tubes and flues: 1,485.96 sq ft (138.050 m^{2})
- Superheater
  - Type: "Swindon No. 3"
  - Heating area: 307.52 sq ft (28.570 m^{2})
- Cylinders: Two, outside
- Cylinder size: 18 in × 30 in (457 mm × 762 mm) - 18 1/2 in × 30 in (470 mm × 762 mm)
- Valve gear: Stephenson
- Valve type: 10 inches (254 mm) piston valves
Performance figures
- Tractive effort: 20,530 lbf (91.32 kN) - 24,395 lbf (108.51 kN)
Career
- Class: 2900 or Saint
- Power class: GWR: C; BR: 4P
- Number in class: 78th
- Numbers: 2999
- Official name: Lady of Legend
- Axle load class: GWR: Red
- First run: 5 April 2019
- Disposition: Operational

GWR 2900 Saint Class 2999 Lady of Legend is a British "new-build" 4-6-0 steam locomotive completed in 2019. It is a 4-6-0 standard gauge locomotive built to a 1902 design by George Jackson Churchward. It was constructed by the Great Western Society using the frames and boiler of 4900 Hall Class 4942 Maindy Hall at Didcot Railway Centre in Oxfordshire, where it is now based. Lady of Legend was constructed because all other members of the GWR Saint Class were scrapped, and due to the prevalence and influence of the class, it was decided that it was worthwhile to construct a new member of the class for modern audiences.

== Background ==
=== The Great Western Society ===
The Great Western Society (GWS) was formed in the 1960s with the purpose of preserving former Great Western Railway steam locomotives. They are based at Didcot Railway Centre. The project to construct a new 2900 Saint was started in the 1970s by the GWS under the name "the Saint Project", which was an ambition of the group since its inception. Building a new 2900 Saint would replace a missing class that was not previously represented in preservation, all original examples having been scrapped. Therefore, they said, the new locomotive would "help educate and inform the public of the history of the Great Western Railway's steam locomotive designs."

=== 2900 Saint class ===
The 2900 Saint class is now acknowledged by preservationists to have significantly influenced subsequent British steam locomotive development due to its advances in steam technology. The class was used successfully by their designer, G. J. Churchward, to compare the features of the different types of steam locomotive found across Europe and North America, and therefore is the source of many of the design principles which would go on to be incorporated in subsequent GWR and eventually British Rail steam locomotive designs. All examples of this class would be scrapped between 1925 and 1953 due to the introduction of more efficient designs, such as the Castle class.

=== Failed attempt ===
The first attempt to build a new GWR Saint in the 1970s did not succeed. It envisioned a locomotive later in design than the engine that ended up being constructed, with curved drop ends at the front of the frames and beneath the cab, in the style introduced from No. 2911 onwards. Its failure was attributed to the fact that these design features were already being represented in preservation, and the fact that many thought it was "beyond the capability of preservationists" to entirely rebuild an extinct class. The successful attempt was therefore assisted by the decision to base the new locomotive off of the frames and boiler of an existing Hall class (4942 Maindy Hall), which removed the necessity to cast all new frames, an otherwise costly part of constructing a new locomotive; and the success of 60163 Tornado, which helped shift public attitudes in favor of new-build steam locomotives and allowed the Great Western Society access to the capital necessary to construct 2999.

=== Donor locomotive ===
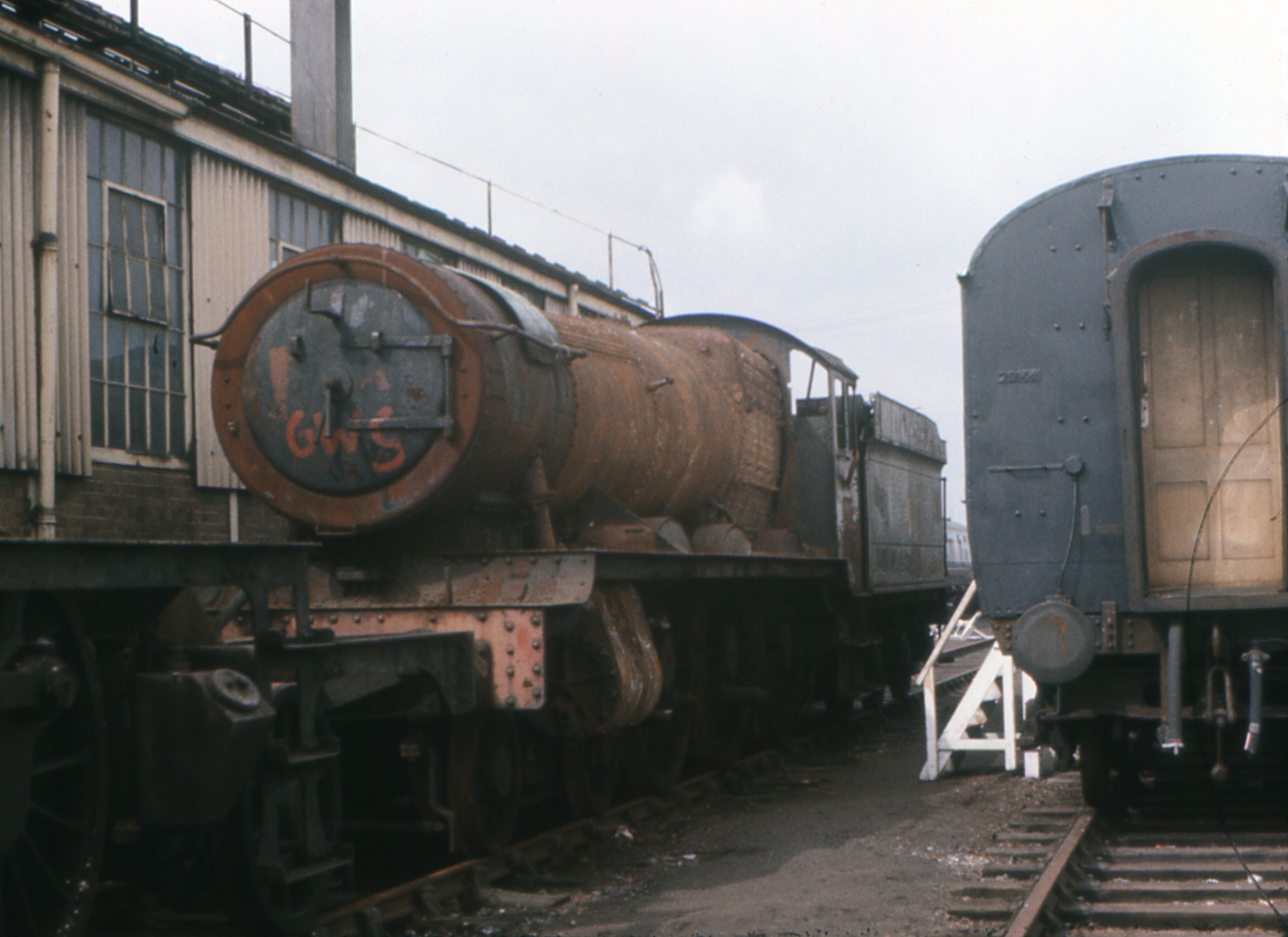
4942 Maindy Hall in scrapyard condition before reconstruction into Lady of Legend at Didcot.

4942 Maindy Hall was a 4-6-0 locomotive of the GWR's 4900 Hall class. It was built in 1929 at Swindon and now forms the frames and boiler of Lady of Legend. After being withdrawn from service in 1963, Maindy Hall was moved to Woodham Brothers scrapyard in Barry, South Wales in 1964. After ten years in the scrapyard, it was bought by Didcot Railway Centre in 1974, who also bought 5900 Hinderton Hall.

After acquiring the locomotives, the Great Western Society decided to back-convert and rebuild Maindy Hall from scrapyard condition into a 2900 Saint class. There are another ten members of the 4900 Hall class in preservation, including one in Didcot's possession, so the loss of a Hall was considered acceptable by preservationists. Historically, the first Hall class prototype was converted from 2925 Saint Martin, so reverting a Hall back to a 2900 Saint was not only practical, but had a historical precedent.

== Construction ==
In order to convert a Hall to a Saint, a number of modifications had to be made. For example, the size of the driving wheels for a Hall are 6 feet (1.83 m), while the size of the driving wheels for a Saint are 6 feet 8 1/2 inches (2.04 m), the front bogie wheels are similarly larger on a Saint than those of a Hall. The conversion process began in January 2004, with the manufacture of new driving wheelsets and an ultrasonic analysis of Maindy Hall's frame.

Other parts used in the construction of 2999 are original GWR-made parts that had, at one time, been fitted to Saints. Such examples include a connecting rod from 2906 Lady of Lynn, and a whistle from 2910 Lady of Shalott. The chimney is also an original GWR-made part, but is from a 6800 class 4-6-0.

The engine was largely constructed in an early configuration, with straight frames, lever reversing gear and a flush riveted tender tank, as these features were not previously represented in preservation. For practical reasons, there are a number of components and features that are later in design than the Lady series as they originally left the factory.

=== Modern modifications and mainline operation ===
The original height of the 2900 Saint class was 13 feet 3 1/2 inches (4.05 m), but the maximum height allowed for steam locomotives to work on the British mainline by Network Rail is 13 feet 1 inch (3.99 m), because of overhead line clearances. The height of 2999 was therefore reduced, compared to others in its class, to allow for this. Mainline operation also requires additional electronic equipment which none of the original members of 2999's class had, including: AWS, TPWS, OTMR, GSM-R and newly ERTMS which Lady of Legend is not fitted with. 2999 is not expected to operate on the mainline due the lack of this equipment, gauging concerns, and the 2019 decision from Didcot to cease mainline operations. It has therefore exclusively operated on British heritage railways.

=== Atlantic option ===
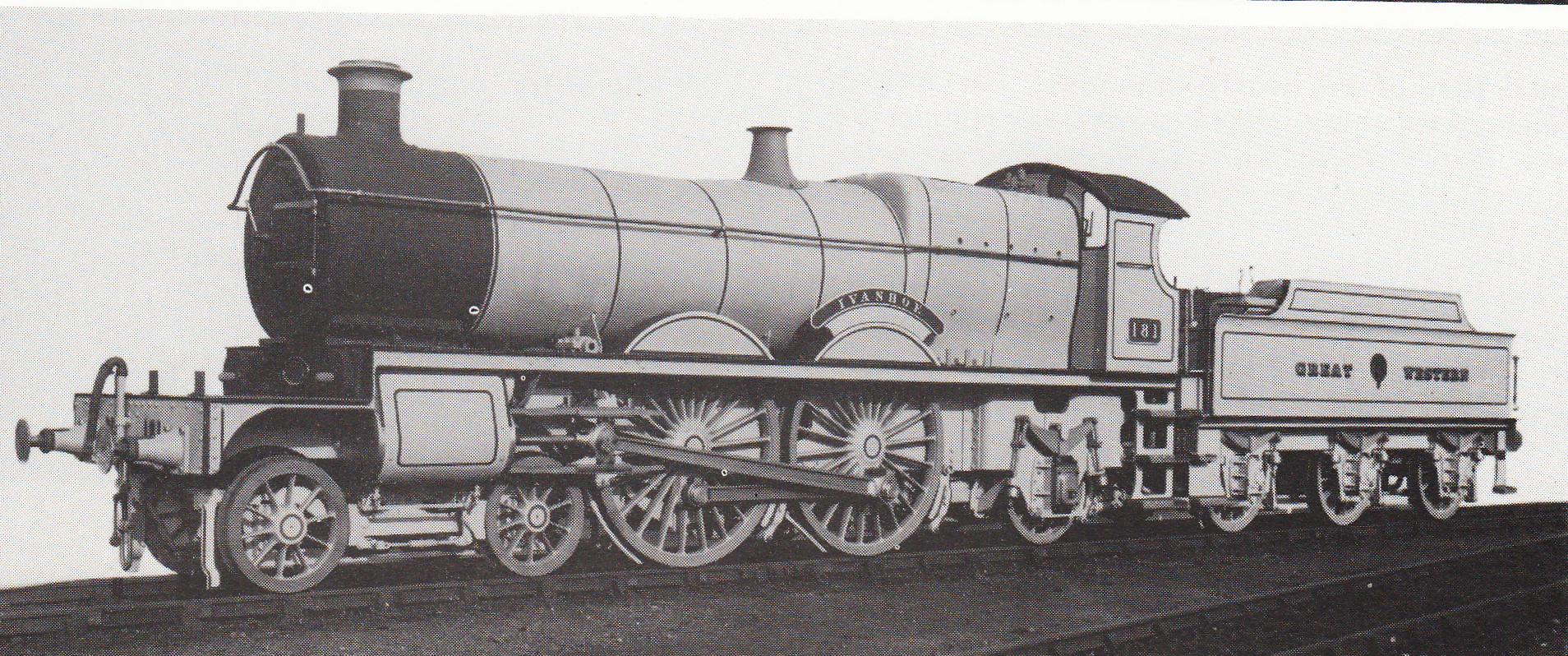
An example of a GWR Saint built in the Atlantic 4-4-2 configuration. Note the rear trailing wheels.

The "Atlantic option" is an alternative wheel arrangement for 2999. Although it is intended by the Great Western Society that the locomotive will run primarily in its 4-6-0 configuration as a Saint, it is planned to have the engine run for a period during its 10-year boiler certification as a 4-4-2 Atlantic. This means that the locomotive will have its rear driving wheels removed and replaced with a set of trailing wheels. This mirrors the original Saint class, of which 13 were built as 4-4-2s for comparative purposes, and only later converted to 4-6-0s. This conversion will be accompanied by a name change.

=== Name selection ===
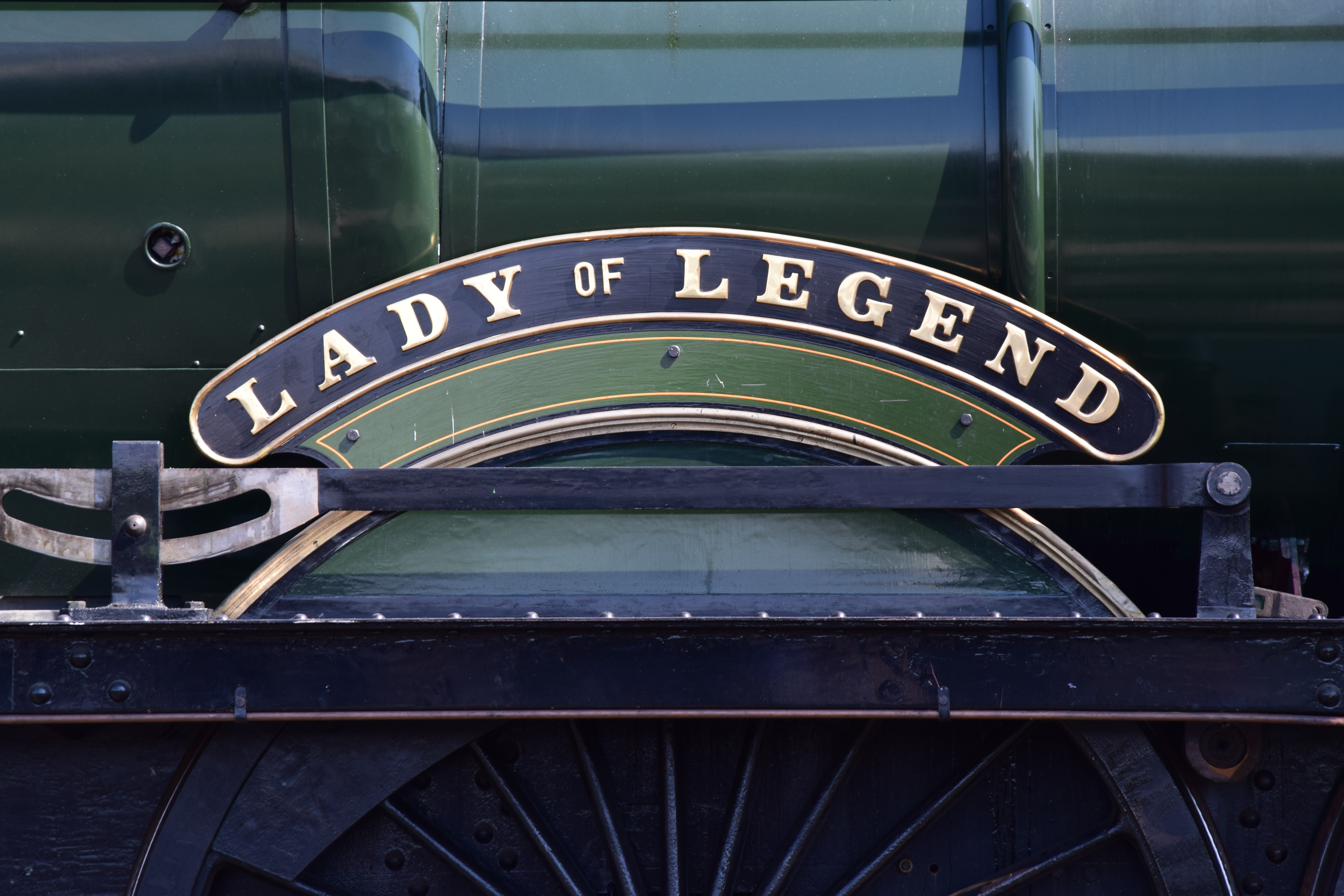
2999 Lady of Legend's nameplate.

The Great Western Society decided, like 60163 Tornado, to number the new locomotive as a new member of the Saint class, sequential to the highest-numbered original Saint: 2998 Ernest Cunard. To name their locomotive, the Great Western Society ran a competition in conjunction with the Steam Railway magazine. Many names were submitted, but the name eventually chosen was Lady of Legend. The name was chosen because an early production lot of Saints were named after historical, mythological or poetical 'Ladies', so the name would be in-keeping with the GWR's naming scheme. The judges also liked the "enterprising nature and legendary spirit" that the name tied to the project and locomotive. Other names that were submitted in the competition included: Lady in Waiting, Lady Diana, Lady of Lourdes, Saint Dai, Maindy Court and Lady of Maindy (in reference to donor loco 4942 Maindy Hall), Prince Charles, John Betjeman & Phoenix.

When running as a 4-4-2 Atlantic, the locomotive is expected to carry the names Atlantic or Churchward.

=== Special appearance ===
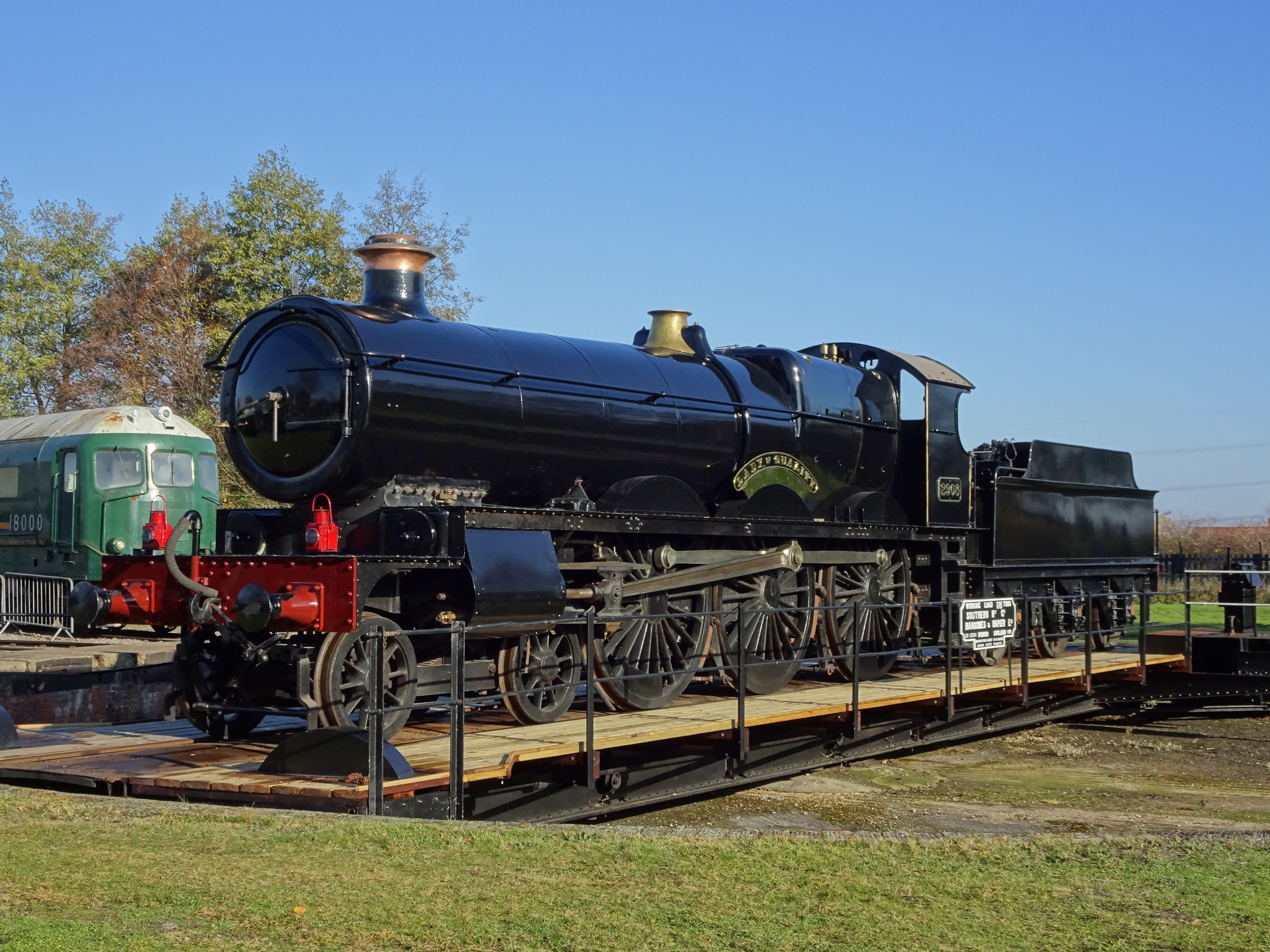
2999 appearing as classmate Lady of Quality before completion.

On 18 November 2018, for a series of photo charters prior to completion, 2999 appeared in a British Railways black unlined livery while bearing the name and number of scrapped classmates; 2908 Lady of Quality, and earlier in the same day, 2983 Redgauntlet. The funds from the photo charters were used to complete the locomotive. It subsequently appears in GWR Brunswick green as 2999 Lady of Legend.

=== Completion ===
After fifteen years of construction, 2999 Lady of Legend was formally launched on 5 April 2019 in a special event for supporters of the Great Western Society's Saint Project at Didcot Railway Centre. The locomotive subsequently operates from its base at Didcot and appears as a guest at heritage railways across the UK.

== Gallery ==
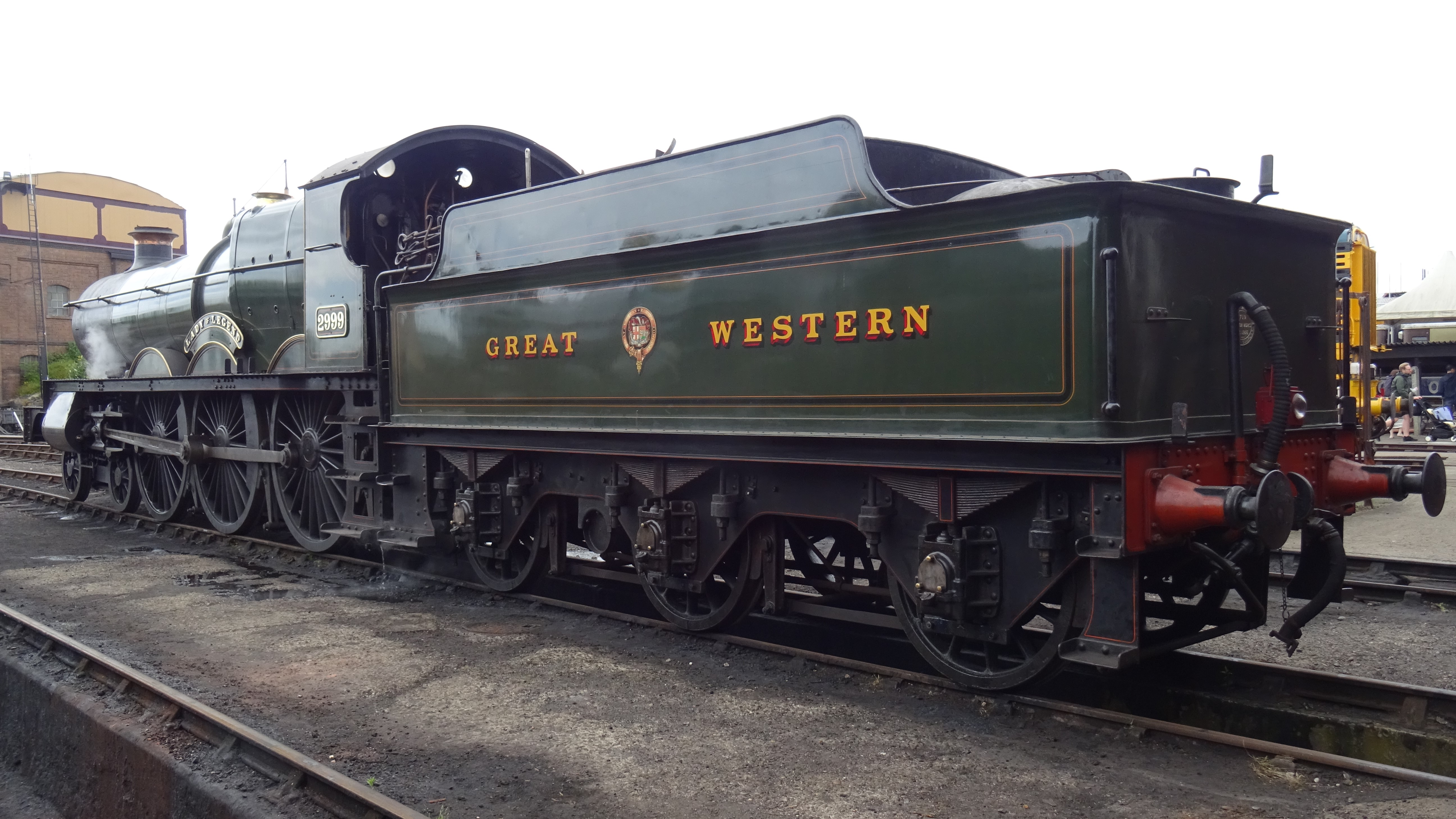
The completed 2999 from a tender side view.

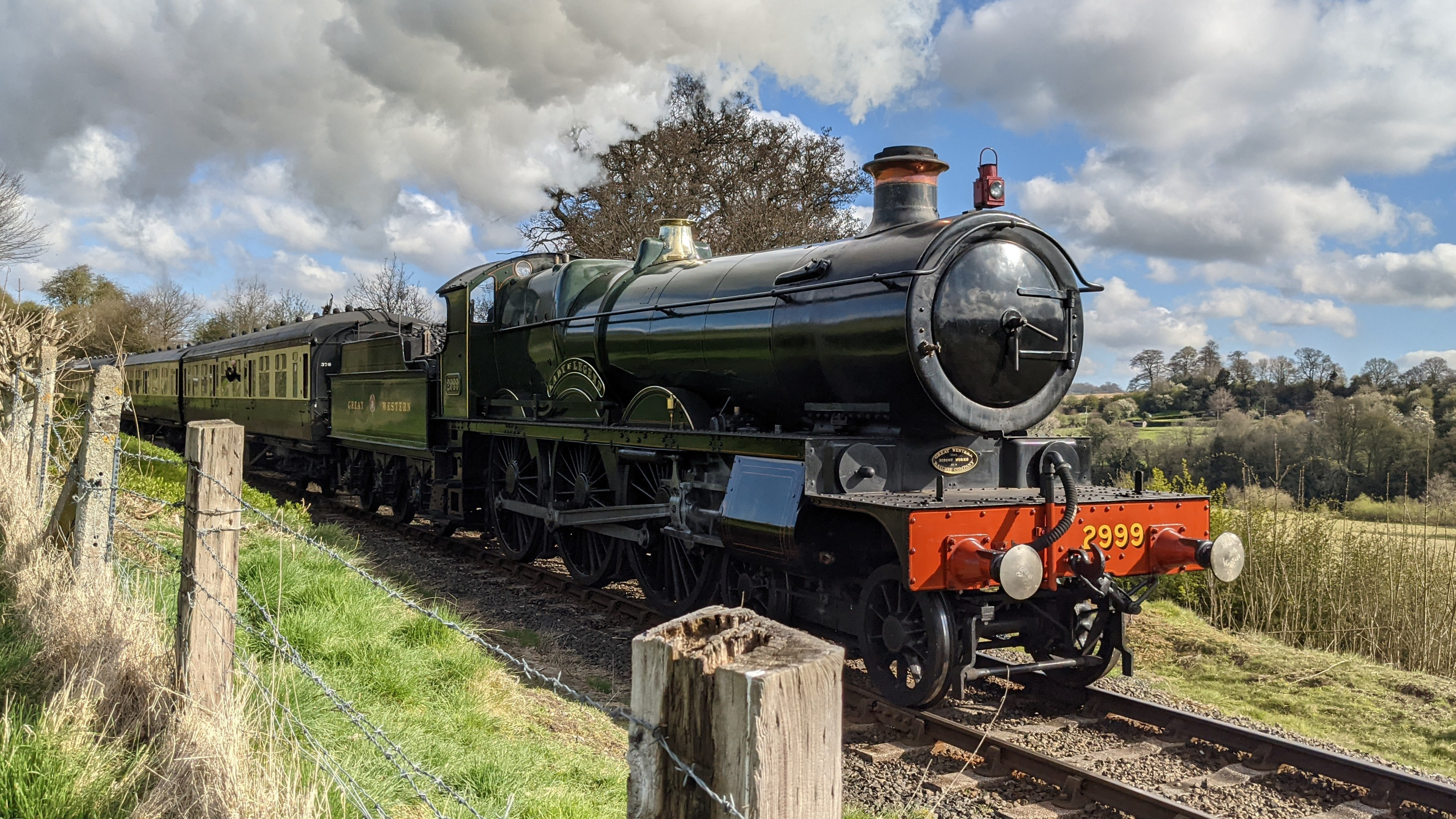
Lady of Legend pulling a train on the Severn Valley Railway.

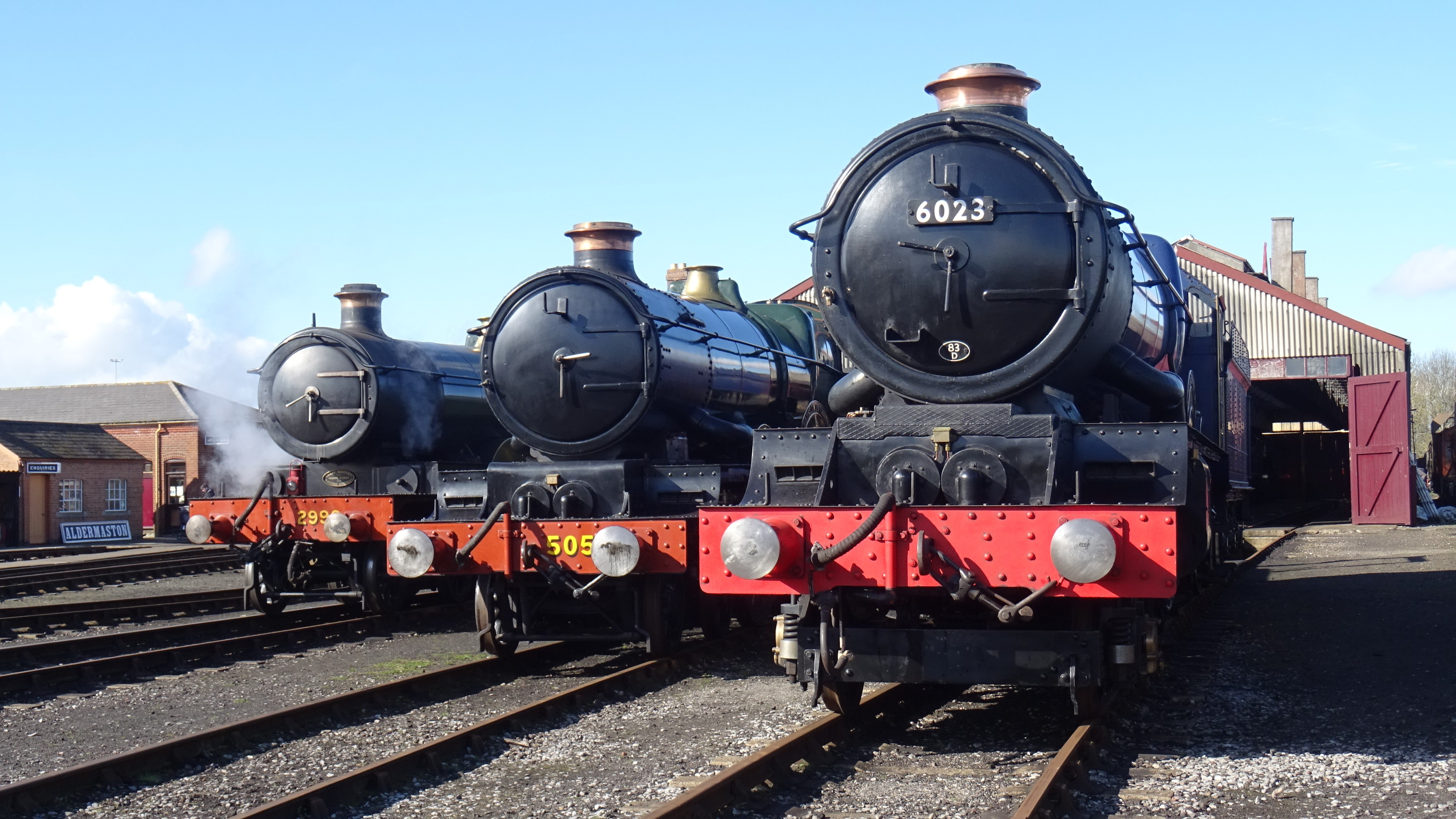
2999 (left) in comparison with other Great Western locomotives.

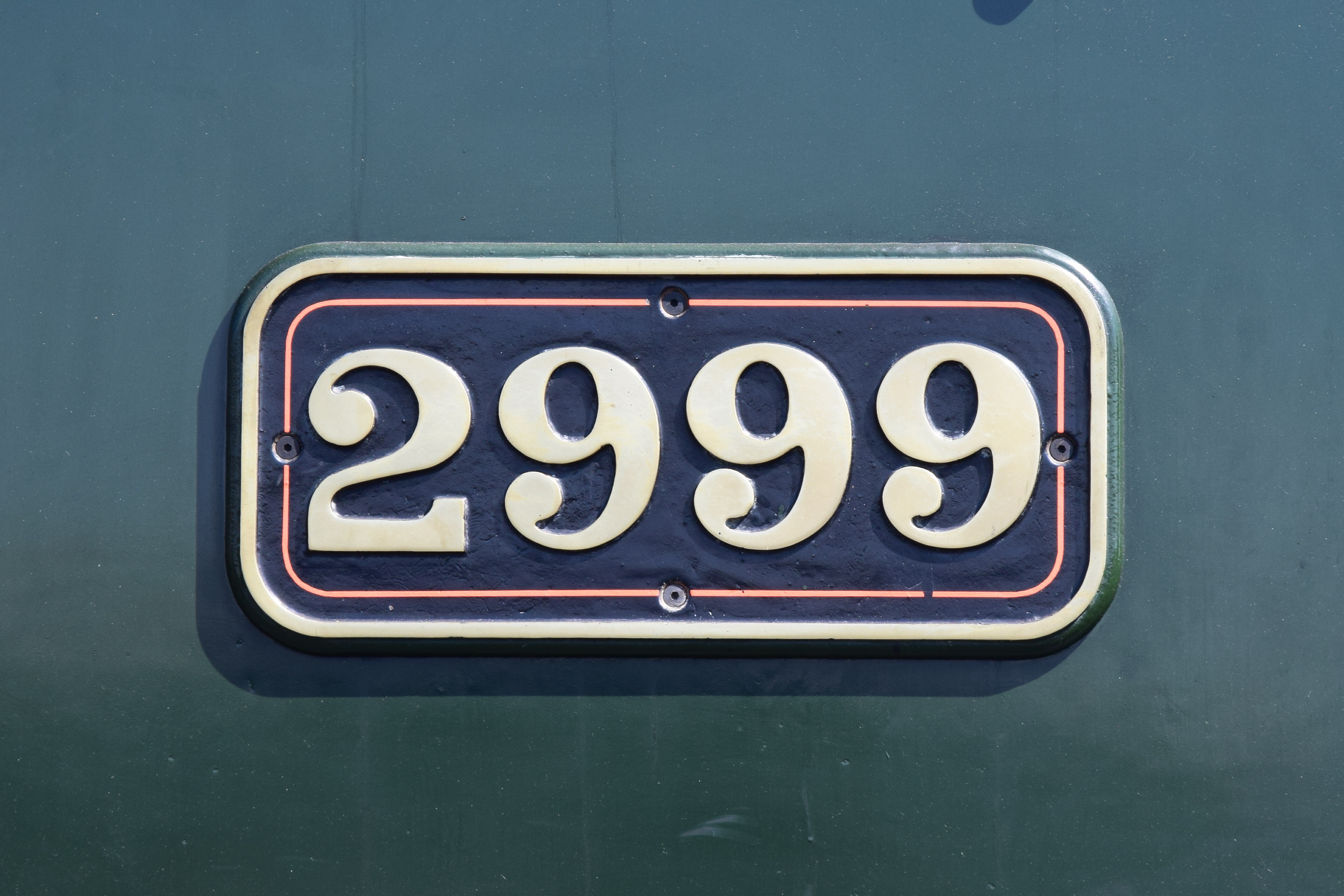
Lady of Legend's numberplate.

== See also ==
- Heritage railway
- Didcot
