= Pickford =

Pickford is a surname, and may refer to

- Sir Alfred Pickford (1872–1947), Scouting luminary and friend of Lord Baden-Powell
- Charlotte Hennessey (1873–1928), aka Charlotte Smith Pickford, Canadian-American actress, mother of Mary, Lottie, and Jack Pickford
- Catherine Pickford (born 1976), English Anglican priest
- Grace Evelyn Pickford (1902–1986), American biologist
- Henry Pickford (fl. 1820–1857), English cricketer
- Jack Pickford (1896–1933), Canadian-American actor, brother of Mary Pickford
- Jack Pickford (footballer) (1904–1971), Australian rules footballer
- James Pickford (born 1979), British race car driver
- Jordan Pickford (born 1994), English footballer
- Joseph Pickford (1734–1782), British architect
- Kevin Pickford (born 1975), American Major League Baseball pitcher
- Lottie Pickford (1893–1936), Canadian-American actress, sister of Mary Pickford
- Martin Pickford (born 1943), British-born paleoanthropologist
- Mary Pickford (1892–1979), Canadian-American actress
- Mary Ada Pickford (1884–1934), British politician, industrialist and historian
- Olive Thomas Pickford (1894–1920), American actress
- Ste and John Pickford, English video game designers
- Thomas Pickford, convicted of murdering Jody Dobrowski in South London in 2005
- William Pickford, 1st Baron Sterndale (1848–1923), British lawyer and judge
- William Pickford (1861–1938), English football administrator,

== See also ==
- Pickfords, British-based moving company
- Pickfair
- Pickford, Michigan
- Pickford Township, Michigan
- Pickford's House Museum, Derby, England
- Pickford Center for Motion Picture Study, Hollywood, California
- Pickford: The Woman Who Made Hollywood, 1997 biography of actress Mary Pickford
