= GWR 4900 Class 4979 Wootton Hall =

Preserved British 4-6-0 locomotive

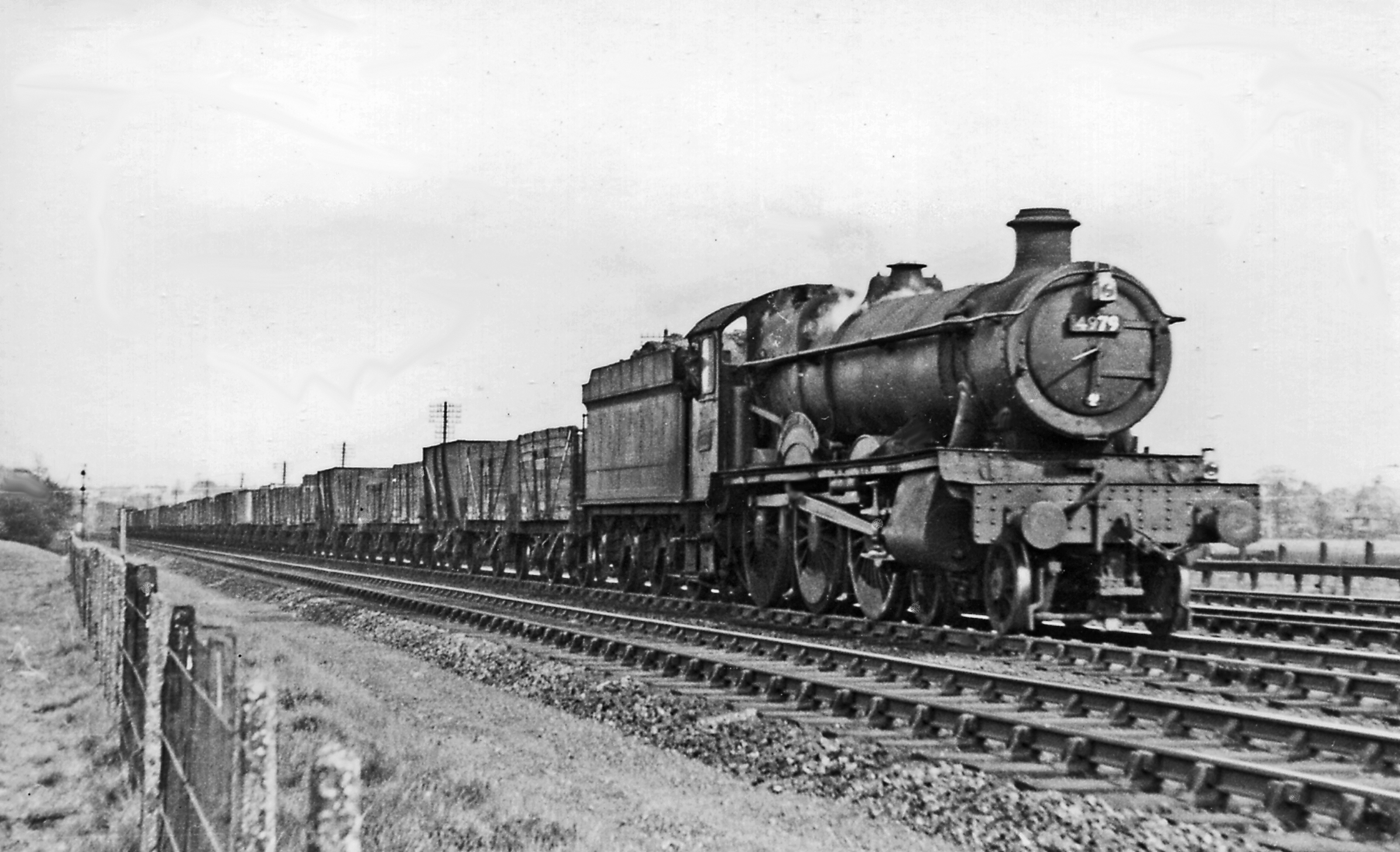
- 4979 Wootton Hall hauling a set of empty wagons down the ex-GW main line, approaching Reading at Kennet Bridge Box.
Type and origin
- Power type: Steam
- Designer: Charles Collett
- Builder: GWR Swindon Works
- Build date: February 1930
Specifications
- Configuration
  - Whyte: 4-6-0
- Loco weight: 75 tons (68 t)
- Fuel type: Coal
- Cylinders: Two, outside
Career
- Operators: Great Western Railway, British Railways
- Class: 4900 'Hall' Class
- Numbers: 4979
- Official name: Wootton Hall
- First run: February 1930
- Last run: December 1963
- Withdrawn: December 1963
- Current owner: Furness Railway Trust
- Disposition: Undergoing restoration to operating condition

GWR 4900 Class 4-6-0 No. 4979 Wootton Hall is a Hall class 4-6-0 steam locomotive. It was built at Swindon, in February 1930, and was one of 258 Hall class steam locomotives constructed.

Its first shed allocation was Plymouth Laira, and it was withdrawn from Oxford shed in December 1963 after almost 34 years of service. During its career it was allocated to sheds including Plymouth Laira, Tyseley, Cardiff Canton, Southall, Didcot, Reading and Oxford, and ended its days in the London Division of the Western Region of British Railways, based at Southall, Reading, Didcot and finally Oxford in July 1958. It was used for a variety of duties including fast passenger service and freight.

It was withdrawn from service in December 1963 and sold for scrap to Woodham Brothers at Barry in April 1964.

== Allocations & History ==
The locations of 4979 on particular dates. (UNFINISHED)

February 1930 (First Shed)	Plymouth Laira, LA then 83D
?	Oxford, OXY then 81F
?	Penzance, PZ then 83G
?	Tyseley, TYS then 84E
?	Severn Tunnel Junction, 86E
?	Cardiff Canton, CTN then 86C
21 March 1953	Southall, 81C
8 October 1955	Didcot, 81E
5 October 1957	Reading, 81D
12 June 1958	Oxford, 81F
31 December 1963	Withdrawn
June 1964	Acquired by Barry Scrapyard
October 1986	Purchased for preservation

== Preservation ==
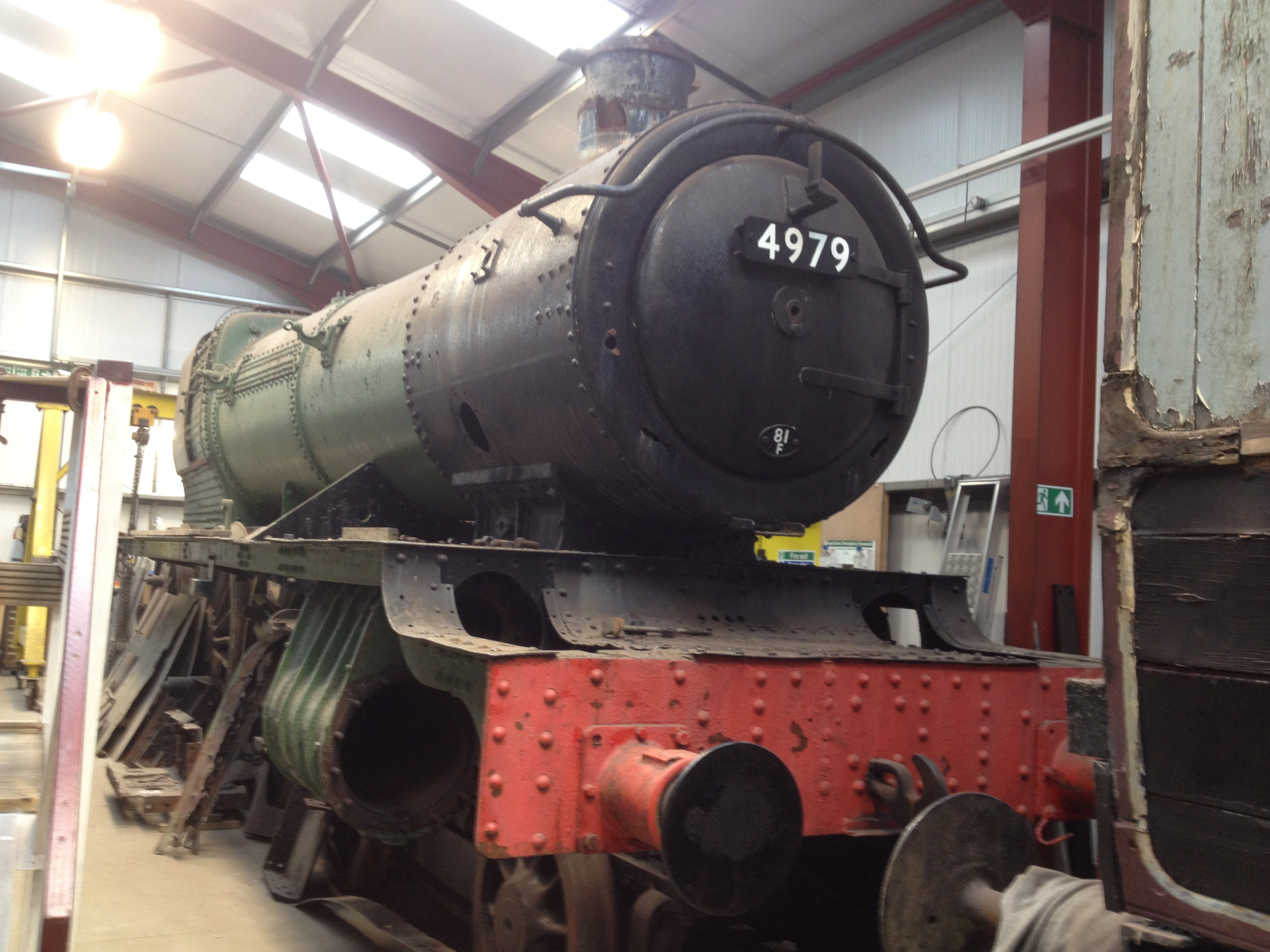
Wootton Hall standing inside the FRT shed awaiting restoration.

4979 is one of several Halls salvaged from Woodhams' Scrapyard. It was sold to Fleetwood Locomotive Centre in Lancashire, and left as the 179th departure from Barry in October 1986.

In 1994 it was purchased by the Furness Railway Trust and moved to storage at the Lytham Motive Power Museum. In March 2007 it was again moved to a new storage site at Appleby where, during its time at the Heritage Centre there, preventative maintenance was carried out to prevent further decay on the locomotive after years of damage due to the sea air at Barry and Fleetwood.

With the completion of the FRT's new accommodation in Preston in October 2014, Wootton Hall was moved from Appleby to the Trust's Ribble Steam Railway workshop at Preston, where restoration began. The tender tank was removed and scrapped. An original Collett 3400-gallon tender tank was located, purchased, restored and has been fitted to the tender frames using as many of the reusable parts as possible from the original tank. Much progress has also been made and many parts have been trial fitted to the locomotive. A coupling rod has recently been purchased and delivered to Preston. The next major step is a boiler survey and lift to allow the restoration of the boiler to be undertaken.
