= GWR 4900 Class 5900 Hinderton Hall =

Preserved British steam locomotive

5900 Hinderton Hall
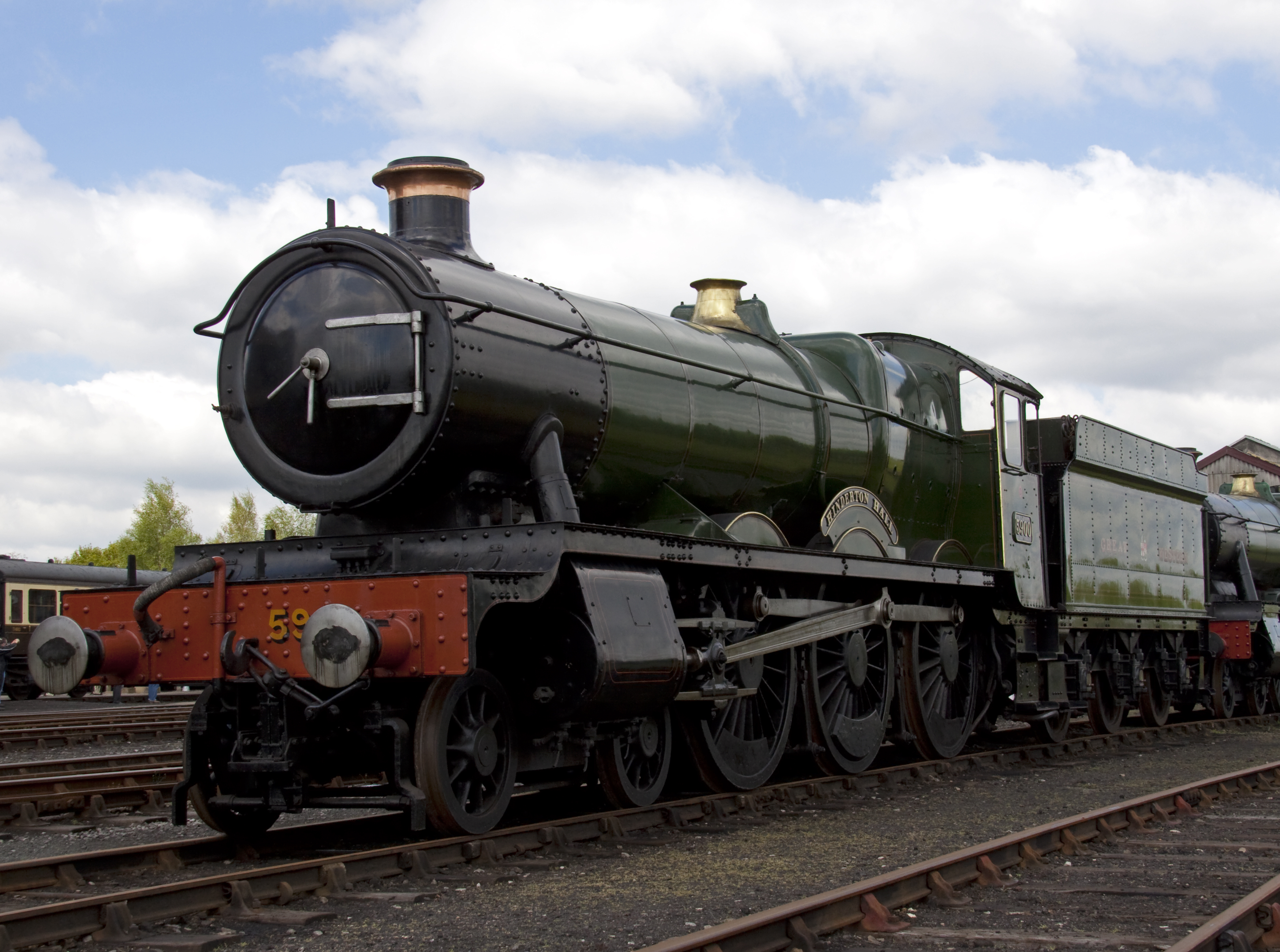
- 5900 at Didcot.
Type and origin
- Power type: Steam
- Designer: Charles Collett
- Builder: Swindon Works
- Build date: March 1931
Specifications
- Configuration
  - Whyte: 4-6-0
- Gauge: 4 ft 8 1/2 in (1,435 mm)
- Fuel type: Coal
- Cylinders: Two, outside
Career
- Operators: Great Western Railway; British Railways
- Class: 4900 'Hall' Class
- Numbers: 5900
- Retired: December 1963
- Restored: 1976
- Current owner: Didcot Railway Centre
- Disposition: On static display, awaiting overhaul

Hinderton Hall is a GWR 4900 Class 4-6-0 steam locomotive preserved at Didcot Railway Centre. It was designed by Collett in 1928, built at Swindon in 1931 as the 101st of its class.

The locomotive spent most of its working life in the West Country. It was withdrawn from Bristol in 1963 and sent to Woodham Brothers scrapyard in Barry, South Wales. It was rescued by members of the Great Western Society and sent to Didcot Railway Centre in 1971. It saw considerable main line service (including the GWR 150 celebrations in 1985), as well as use at the railway centre. As of April 2019, it is on static display and is waiting for an overhaul.
