= Harry Pitchford =

English cricketer

Personal information
- Born: 11 February 1891; Wing, Buckinghamshire, England
- Died: 11 July 1965 (aged 74); Aylesbury, Buckinghamshire, England
- Batting: Right-handed
- Bowling: Right-arm slow
- Relatives: Len Pitchford (brother)

Domestic team information
- Years: Team
- 1913–1929: Buckinghamshire
- 1928: Minor Counties

Career statistics
Competition	First-class
Matches	1
Runs scored	36
Batting average	18.00
100s/50s	0/0
Top score	24
Balls bowled	24
Wickets	0
Bowling average	–
5 wickets in innings	–
10 wickets in match	–
Best bowling	–
Catches/stumpings	0/–
- Source: Cricinfo, 26 May 2011

Harry Pitchford (11 February 1891 – 11 July 1965) was an English cricketer. Pitchford was a right-handed batsman who bowled right-arm slow. He was born in Wing, Buckinghamshire.

Pitchford made his debut for Buckinghamshire in the 1913 Minor Counties Championship against Wiltdshire. He next played Minor counties cricket for Buckinghamshire following the First World War, representing the county from 1921 to 1925. He played a total of 50 Minor Counties Championship matches for Buckinghamshire.

Pitchford made his only first-class appearance for a combined Minor Counties cricket team against the touring West Indians in 1928. In the Minor Counties first-innings, he scored 24 runs before being dismissed by Herman Griffith. In their second-innings, he was run out for 12 runs.

He later appeared for the Glamorgan Second XI in a single Minor Counties Championship match in 1935, against the Middlesex Second XI. He died in Aylesbury, Buckinghamshire on 11 July 1965. He was survived by his brother, Len, who played first-class cricket for Glamorgan.
