= Len Pitchford =

English cricketer

Leonard Pitchford
Personal information
- Born: 4 December 1900; Wing, Buckinghamshire, England
- Died: 10 May 1992 (aged 91); Clydach, Glamorgan, Wales
- Batting: Right-handed
- Bowling: Right-arm off break
- Relatives: Harry Pitchford (brother)

Domestic team information
- Years: Team
- 1933–1934: Monmouthshire
- 1935: Glamorgan

Career statistics
Competition	First-class
Matches	2
Runs scored	24
Batting average	12.00
100s/50s	0/0
Top score	14*
Balls bowled	18
Wickets	0
Bowling average	–
5 wickets in innings	–
10 wickets in match	–
Best bowling	–
Catches/stumpings	0/–
- Source: Cricinfo, 5 July 2010

Leonard Pitchford (4 December 1900 – 10 May 1992) was an English cricketer. Pitchford was a right-handed batsman who bowled right-arm off break. He was born at Wing, Buckinghamshire.

Pitchford made his Minor Counties Championship debut for Monmouthshire in 1933 against the Warwickshire Second XI. From 1933 to 1934, he represented the county in 6 Minor Counties matches, with his final appearance coming against the Kent Second XI.

Pitchford played 2 first-class matches for Glamorgan in 1935 County Championship against Yorkshire and Warwickshire. In his 2 first-class matches, he scored 24 runs batting average of 12.00, with a high score of 14*.

Pitchford died at Clydach, Glamorgan on 10 May 1992.

== Family ==
His brother Harry played a single first-class match in 1928 for a combined Minor Counties team against the touring West Indians.
