= GWR 101 Class =

Unique oil-burning steam locomotive

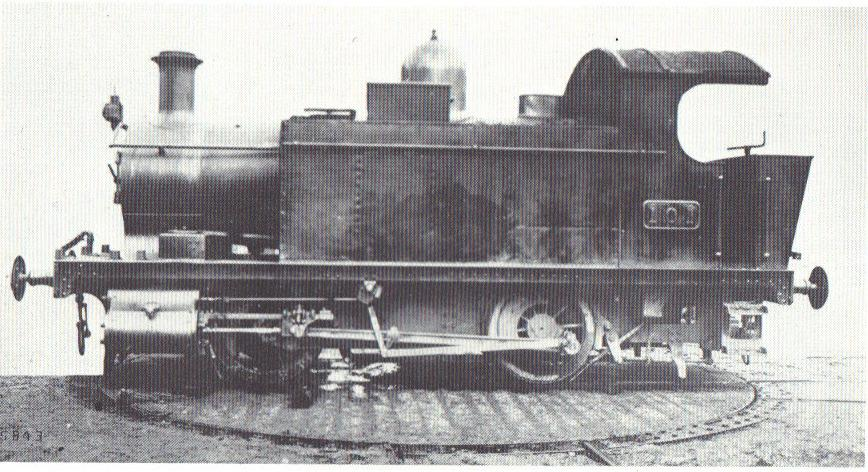
- 101 after conversion to burn coal in 1905
Type and origin
- Dimensions are for coal-burning version
- Power type: Steam
- Designer: George Jackson Churchward
- Builder: GWR Swindon Works
- Order number: Lot 136
- Serial number: 1969
- Build date: 1902
- Total produced: 1 (prototype)
- Rebuild date: 1905
Specifications
- Configuration
  - Whyte: 0-4-0T
- Gauge: 1,435 mm (4 ft 8 1/2 in)
- Coupled dia.: 3 ft 8 in (1.118 m)
- Wheelbase: 9 ft (2.743 m)
- Length
  - Over buffers: 26 ft 8 1/4 in (8.134 m)
- Loco weight: 28 long tons 13 cwt (64,200 lb or 29.1 t) (32.1 short tons) full
- Fuel type: Oil (Original); Coal (Rebuilt)
- Water cap.: 500 imp gal (2,300 L; 600 US gal)
- Firebox
  - Grate area: 7.78 sq ft (0.723 m^{2})
- Boiler pressure: 160 lbf/in^{2} (1.10 MPa)
- Cylinders: Two, outside
- Cylinder size: 13 in × 22 in (330 mm × 559 mm)
- Valve gear: Joy valve gear
Performance figures
- Tractive effort: 12,168 lbf (54.1 kN)
Career
- Operators: GWR
- Numbers: 101
- Withdrawn: 1911
- Disposition: Scrapped

The GWR 101 Class consisted of a single experimental 0-4-0T side-tank steam locomotive. It was built at GWR Swindon Works under the direction of George Jackson Churchward in June 1902.

Originally built as an oil-burning locomotive 'on Holden's system' (Note: James Holden left the GWR in 1885 for the GER, where he developed oil burning technology for steam locomotives, being granted a patent for it in 1899.), it had an unusual boiler containing a firebox constructed as an arched chamber made from fire-bricks, opening to the firetubes in front, and with two oil-burning nozzles at the back. Over this was mounted a short saddle tank for the oil fuel. There was no outer firebox, but the 8 ft × 5 ft (2.438 m × 1.524 m) boiler, pressed to 180 psi (1.2 MPa), contained 289 firetubes in the lower part and a large steam space above.

As soon as July 1902, it was redesigned with a smaller firebox and a single burner. It was given a Lentz boiler with a cylindrical corrugated firebox inside the barrel in 1903. The saddle tank for fuel was removed and oil stored at the rear end of the side tanks. In 1905, the locomotive was rebuilt as a coal burner, with the cab backplate replaced by a bunker.

It was intended for light passenger service on the Wrington Vale Light Railway near Bristol. However, due to technical issues associated with the design, the locomotive never saw the intended service. It remained at Swindon Works, used as a works shunter. No further engines were built to this design, and the locomotive was withdrawn and scrapped in 1911.

Despite it being a unique, obscure and short-lived experimental loco, Hornby have been producing a 00 scale model of No. 101 since 1978, in many prototypical and non-prototypical guises. It is currently sold as part of the Railroad range. Hornby have sometimes inaccurately ascribed the whole design to Holden, instead of just the oil-burning mechanism.

== See also ==
- GWR oil burning steam locomotives
- Oil burner (engine)
