= GWR 4900 Class 4965 Rood Ashton Hall =

Preserved British steam locomotive

4965 Rood Ashton Hall
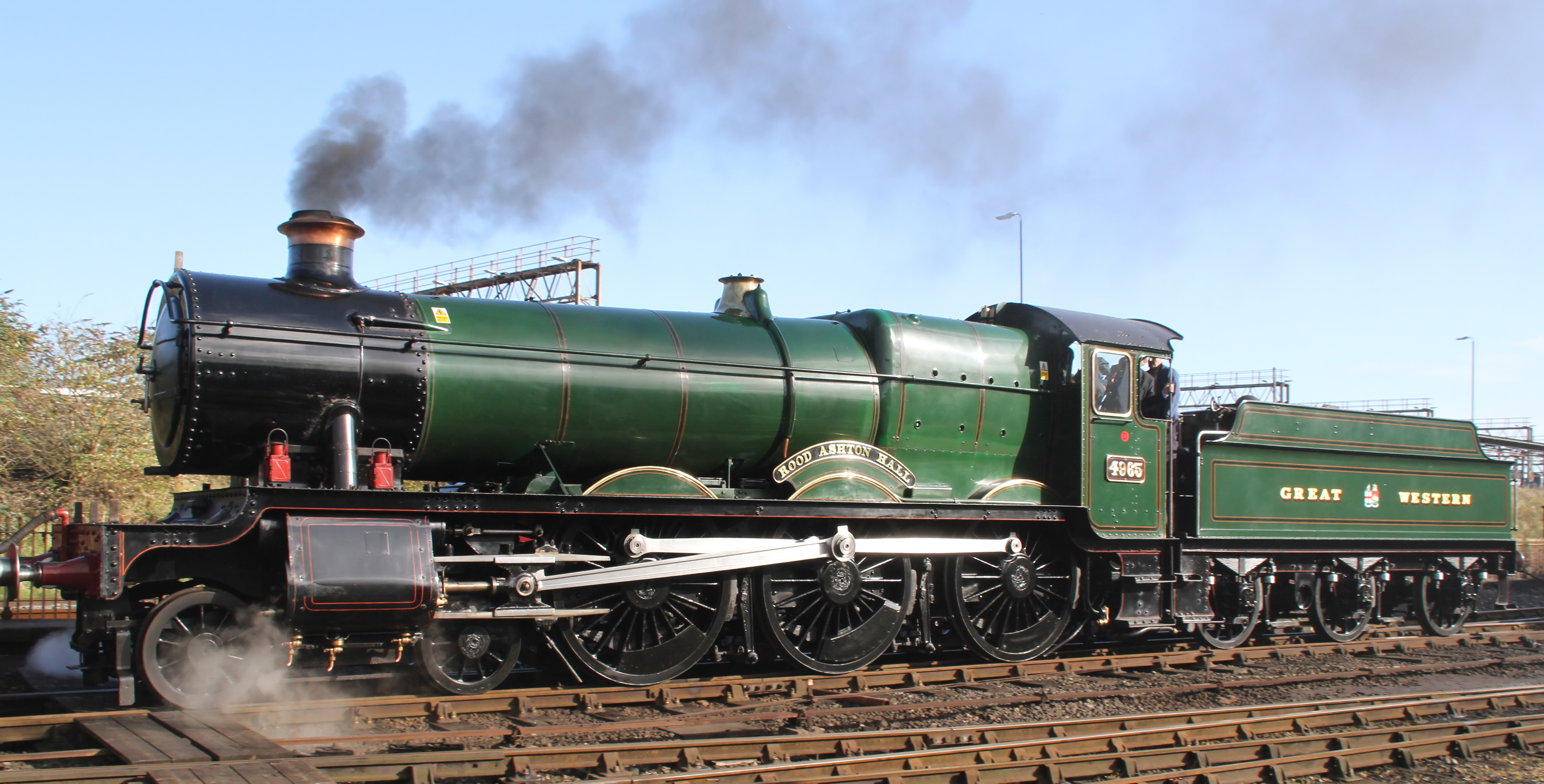
- 4965 Rood Ashton Hall at Tyseley Locomotive Works
Type and origin
- Power type: Steam
- Designer: Charles Collett
- Builder: Swindon Works
- Build date: November 1929
Specifications
- Configuration
  - Whyte: 4-6-0
  - UIC: 2′C h2
- Gauge: 4 ft 8 1/2 in (1,435 mm) standard gauge
- Leading dia.: 3 ft 0 in (0.914 m)
- Driver dia.: 6 ft 0 in (1.829 m)
- Minimum curve: 8 chains (528 ft; 161 m) normal, 7 chains (462 ft; 141 m) slow
- Length: 63 ft 0 1/4 in (19.21 m) over buffers
- Width: 8 ft 11 1/4 in (2.724 m)
- Height: 13 ft 1 in (3.988 m)
- Axle load: 18 long tons 19 cwt (42,400 lb or 19.3 t) (21.2 short tons)
- Adhesive weight: 57 long tons 0 cwt (127,700 lb or 57.9 t) (63.8 short tons)
- Loco weight: 75 long tons 0 cwt (168,000 lb or 76.2 t) (84.0 short tons)
- Fuel type: Coal (Oil)
- Cylinders: Two, outside
Career
- Operators: Vintage Trains
- Class: 4900 Hall Class
- Numbers: 4983; renumbered 4965
- Official name: Albert Hall; renamed Rood Ashton Hall; Polar Star (temporarily)
- Retired: March 1962
- Restored: 1998
- Current owner: Vintage Trains Ltd
- Disposition: Stored, awaiting overhaul

The Great Western Railway steam locomotive no. 4965 Rood Ashton Hall is a Hall class 4-6-0 steam locomotive. It is preserved at Tyseley Locomotive Works, and is currently awaiting overhaul. The engine last operated in Great Western Railway green livery, and performed regularly on the Shakespeare Express, operated by Vintage Trains, between Birmingham and Stratford-upon-Avon, as well as various excursions.

== Allocations ==
4965 was built in November 1929 and its first shed allocation was Plymouth Laira and after 32 years of service it ended up at Oxford. During this time it was allocated to sheds in Penzance, Tyseley, Severn Tunnel Junction, Cardiff Canton, and ended its days in the London Division of the Western Region of British Railways, based at Southall, Reading, Didcot and finally Oxford in July 1958. It was used for a variety of duties including fast passenger service and freight.

It was withdrawn from service in March 1962 and acquired by Woodham Brothers scrapyard in the same year.

== Preservation ==
4965 was rescued from Barry Scrapyard in October 1970, becoming the first member of the class to leave the scrapyard and enter preservation. The locomotive left Barry Scrapyard as the 10th departure. It was previously identified as 4983 Albert Hall, having been rebuilt in 1962 using parts from both original engines Albert Hall and Rood Ashton Hall. Both locomotives had their numbers stamped onto their respective parts. The purchasing group of enthusiasts thought they were buying 4983 Albert Hall but after later restoration discovered some of the parts had been stamped 4965 and some 4983. Rood Ashton Hall now has plates and numbers on one side that say 4983 Albert Hall for enthusiasts to see once again but still hauls Rood Ashton Hall's original tender. Albert Hall's original tender was a large Collett tender, so the only incarnation of 4983 Albert Hall and tender is Hornby's Tri-ang model.

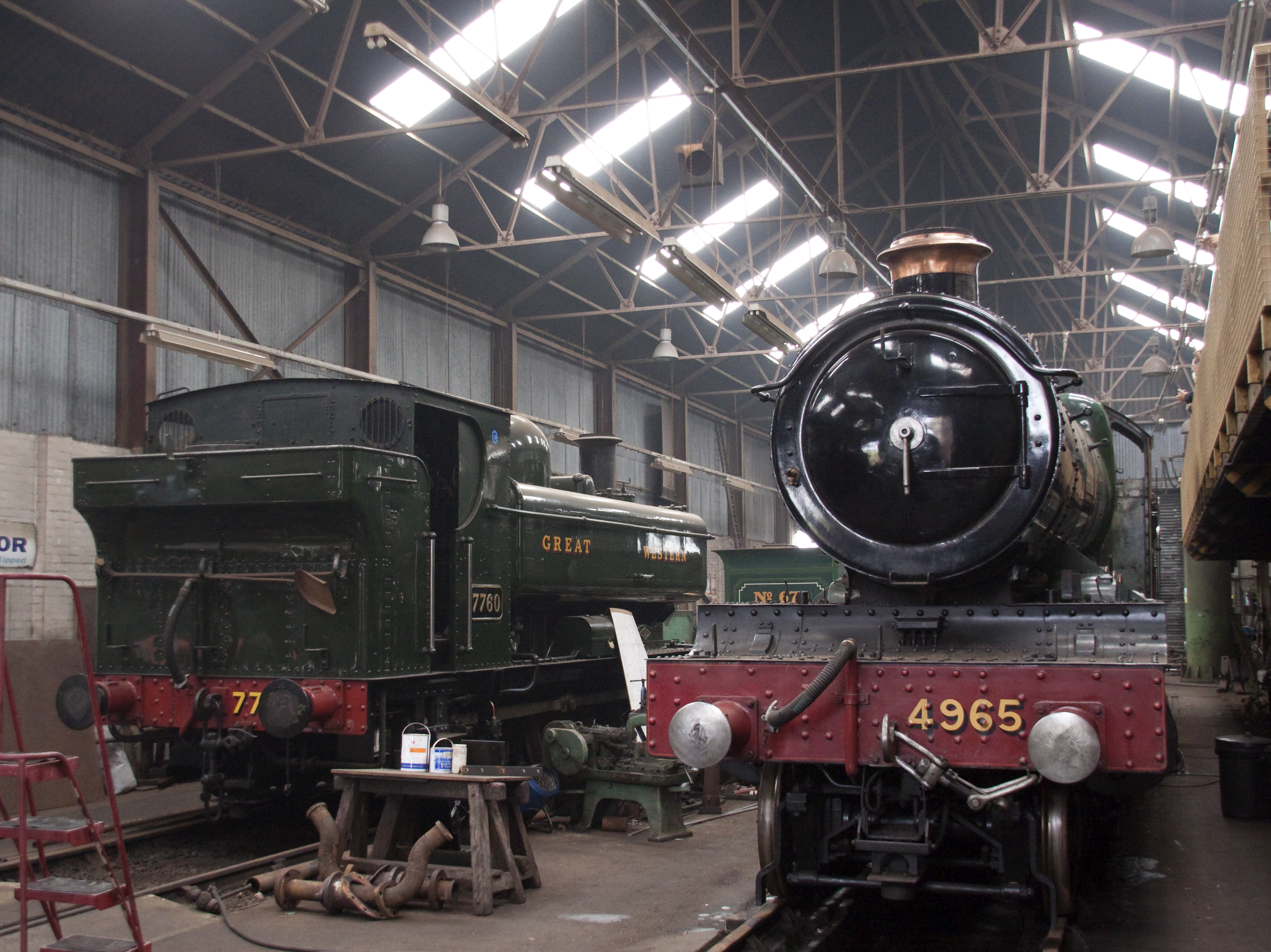
Rood Ashton Hall and pannier tank 7760

In November 2008, Rood Ashton Hall was taken out of service for overhaul after hauling the Rood Ashton Hall Farewell train from Solihull to Didcot Parkway.

The engine's 10-year overhaul took just a few months due to an ongoing programme of maintenance work that had been previously carried out during periods of low main line activity. It returned to the mainline in October 2009 and completed its full ten-year operating certificate before being withdrawn again in September 2019 for a further overhaul, which it awaits.

Right before being withdrawn in 2019, the engine was temporarily renamed Polar Star, and was used to pull the Polar Express Train Ride between Birmingham Moor Street and Tyseley. With the 2020 Coronavirus Pandemic and the engine being out of service awaiting overhaul, the 2020 Birmingham ride was canceled.

In January 2024 it was announced that 4965 is to be the next Tyseley resident engine to be sent into the works for an overhaul which is expected to cost £100,000. The overhaul alongside a retube will include modifications to the engines cylinders for gauging reasons and conversion to oil burning using a GWR oil-firing system (eleven Halls between 1946 and 1950 were converted to oil burning becoming 3900's). It was confirmed in March 2024 that 4965 would be converted to oil-firing during the engines next overhaul which was scheduled to commence in March 2024, upon returning to traffic it would see primary use on "Shakespeare Express" and "Polar Express" trains.
