= GWR locomotive numbering and classification =

Engine numbering practices of the Great Western Railway

The GWR was the longest-lived of the pre-nationalisation railway companies in Britain, surviving the 'Grouping' of the railways in 1923 almost unchanged. As a result, the history of its numbering and classification of locomotives is relatively complicated. This page explains the principal systems that were used.

- For information about individual classes and locomotives, see: Locomotives of the Great Western Railway

== Numbering ==
=== Broad Gauge Era ===
From the start, the GWR gave names only to its broad gauge locomotive stock. However, many classes carried 'themed' names, e.g. stars or signs of the zodiac, which aided identification of locomotives to some extent. See List of 7-foot gauge railway locomotive names

The exception to this rule was that any broad gauge locomotives the GWR absorbed from other railways (in particular, the South Devon Railway and Bristol and Exeter Railway) were given numbers in the 2000-2199 series. This applied even where locomotives had carried names under their previous owner (indeed, these names were usually removed by the GWR) and even when the locomotives had originally belonged to the GWR and had been sold out of stock.

Towards the end of the broad gauge era, a number of locomotives were built to a design that enabled them to be easily converted from one gauge to the other (hence the term 'convertibles' used for these locomotives). These engines also carried numbers in the standard gauge series, whether or not they were running in broad gauge form.

=== Standard Gauge 1854-1877 ===
Initially standard gauge locomotive numbering was a simple sequential system, starting from 1. Numbering in this series, which included new locomotives and those absorbed from other railways, eventually reached 1297. New locomotives were identified as being paid from either revenue or capital account. Initially an effort was made to treat the numbering of locomotives bought out of revenue differently from those out of capital, including by re-using old numbers left vacant following withdrawal, using a duplicate number system (unusually, giving the new locomotives an A suffix - other railways tended to apply such notation to the old locomotive being replaced) and, for a few years, using the series 1000 (later 1001) upwards. In 1875, the sequential system starting at 1 reached 1000 and then jumped to 1116, the other side of the latter range of numbers still carried.

=== Standard Gauge 1877–1902 ===
Under William Dean's leadership, blocks of numbers were allocated for different locomotive types, as follows:

Numbers	Types
1301 to 1400 (1298 to 1300 later added as an overflow)	Absorbed standard and narrow gauge locomotives; series introduced 1875.
1401 to 1500	Passenger tank locomotives
1501 to 2000	0-6-0 tank locomotives
2001 to 2200	Absorbed broad gauge locomotives; series introduced 1876.
2201 to 2300	Passenger tender locomotives
2301 to 3000	Goods tender locomotives
3001 to 3200	Passenger tender locomotives (single driver)
3201 to 3500	Passenger tender locomotives (four-coupled)
3501 upwards	Passenger tank locomotives

The only exceptions to these principles under Dean were use of the 20xx, 21xx, and 27xx series for 0-6-0 tank engines after the end of broad gauge operations. Experimental locomotives and other small classes continued to be numbered in gaps left following withdrawals in the number series below 1000.

=== Standard Gauge 1902-1912 ===
Under George Jackson Churchward, the system applied by William Dean broke down, and new classes simply took the next free block of hundred numbers starting at xx01, with experimental engines numbered in odd gaps in the earlier series of numbers, usually below 110.

=== 1912 Renumbering ===
In December 1912 (the official date being 28 December), the GWR undertook a renumbering of some of its locomotives — mainly 4-4-0 classes — so that locomotives of the same class were numbered consecutively. This desirable aim was made more important following the rebuilding of some Duke and Atbara locomotives to Bulldog and City class designs. A few of the changes were connected with a decision that blocks of numbers for each class should start at xx00 rather than xx01 as previously.

4-4-0 classes
Class	Original Numbers	New Number Range	Notes	Ref
Atbara	3373-3412	4120-4148	3382 scrapped 1911; 3400-3409 rebuilt to City	
Badminton	3292-3311	4100-4119		
Bird	3731-3745	3441-3455		
Bulldog (ex-Duke)	Various (from 3253-3331)	3300-3319		
Bulldog (new build)	3332-3372, 3413-3432, 3443-3472, 3701-3730	3320-3440		
City (ex-Atbara)	3400-3409	3700-3709		
City (new build)	3433-3442	3710-3719		
County	3473-3482, 3801-3830	3800, 3831-3839	3801-3830 not renumbered	
Duke	3252-3291, 3312-3331 (various, total 40)	3252-3291	others rebuilt to Bulldog	
Flower	4101-4120	4149-4168		

Other classes
Class	Wheel arrangement	Original Numbers	New Number Range	Ref
455 (Metro)	2-4-0T	3600	3500	
2600 (Aberdare)	2-6-0	33	2600	
2721	0-6-0T	2800	2700	
2800	2-8-0	97	2800	
2900 (Saint)	4-6-0/4-4-2	98, 100, 171-190	2998, 2900, 2971-2990	
3100	2-6-2T	99	3100	
3600	2-4-2T	11	3600	
4000 (Star)	4-6-0	40	4000	
4400	2-6-2T	115, 3101-10	4400-10	
4500	2-6-2T	2161-90	4500-29	
Cornwall Min. Rly	0-6-0T	1400	1398	

=== Standard Gauge 1912 onwards ===
From the time of the 1912 renumbering, a system was adopted for new locomotives where the second digit indicated the broad type of locomotive. For example, express passenger locomotives had x0xx numbers and large mixed traffic tender locomotives were x9xx. When a class numbered more than 100 locos, rather than continue the numbers consecutively the second digit remained constant (e.g. 4900 Class included 4900-4999, 5900-5999, and 6900 onwards).

At the same time, a change was made so that new classes usually commenced from the number xx00. There was a certain amount of renumbering so that the prototype locomotives for existing classes took the appropriate xx00 number before the series used by production locomotives. Thus, from this time on, numbers below 2000 were mainly occupied by old, absorbed or otherwise non-standard locomotives.

For the separate numbering of steam rail motors, petrol and diesel railcars, diesel shunters and gas turbine locomotives, see section Other number series below.

=== 1923 Renumbering ===
In 1923, the GWR absorbed a number of small railway companies as part of the Grouping. The locomotives that it inherited were renumbered into gaps in the number series below 2199 left vacant by the withdrawal of older locomotives. Many of these engines were withdrawn after a short period of time, but those that survived in 1946 were subject to another renumbering to rationalise the system further (see below).

The bulk of the locomotives absorbed were renumbered into gaps in broad number ranges according to their wheel arrangement. Locomotives from the following railways were included in this scheme: Alexandra Docks Railway, Barry Railway, Cambrian Railways, Cardiff Railway, Midland and South Western Junction Railway, Port Talbot Railway, Rhondda and Swansea Bay Railway, Rhymney Railway, South Wales Mineral Railway, Taff Vale Railway, Vale of Rheidol Railway, and Welshpool and Llanfair Light Railway.

Locomotives from the Brecon and Merthyr Railway, Burry Port and Gwendraeth Valley Railway and Neath and Brecon Railway were also renumbered according to their wheel arrangement, but used a different set of number ranges.

The number ranges used for all these locomotives are set out below, but note that those engines that had previously been sold out of stock by the GWR regained their original GWR numbers, and were not allocated new numbers in these ranges:

Wheel Arrangement	Main Number Range	BMR, BPGVR and NBR Range
0-4-4T	2-23	
2-6-0	24	
4-4-4T	25-27	
0-6-2T	30-603	11-1375, 1668-1833
0-6-0T	604-843	2161-2199
0-6-0	844-1013	
4-4-0	1014-1128	
4-4-0T	1129-1184	1392
2-4-0T	1189-1197	1400-1458
2-6-2T	1199-1213	
4-4-2T	1301-1306	1391
2-4-2T	1307-1326	
2-4-0	1328-1336	
0-4-0T	1338-1343	
0-6-4T	1344-1357	
0-8-2T	1358-1386	
0-8-0	1387-1390	

The locomotives inherited by the GWR from other concerns were renumbered as follows:

- Ex-Cleobury Mortimer and Ditton Priors Light Railway 0-6-0T engines became 28-29.
- Locomotives from the Llanelli & Mynydd Mawr Railway, Powesland and Mason and Swansea Harbour Trust were absorbed after the original numbering series had been drawn up, and these were fitted into available gaps without reference to the original number ranges. In some case they took the numbers of other absorbed engines that had already been withdrawn.
- In the 1940s, the Corris Railway and Weston, Clevedon and Portishead Railway were absorbed. The four engines inherited from these two concerns took GWR numbers 3-6.

=== 1946 Renumbering ===
By 1946, the majority of the locomotives inherited at the 1923 Grouping had been withdrawn, as had most of the older GWR engines numbered below 2000. In order to tidy up the gaps in this number range, it was decided to renumber the surviving locomotives from each pre-Grouping company together. The series used were:

- 1: ex-Ystalyfera Tin Works
- 7-9: ex-Vale of Rheidol Railway
- 30-96: ex-Rhymney Railway
- 193-399: ex-Taff Vale Railway and Barry Railway
- 421-436: ex-Brecon and Merthyr Railway
- 1140-1147: ex-Swansea Harbour Trust
- 1150-1153: ex-Powesland and Mason

=== Oil burning locomotives ===
In 1946/7 a number of locomotives were converted to burn oil, and some were renumbered in the process. Eleven 4900 Hall Class locos were renumbered into the 3900 range. Twelve 2800 Class 2-8-0s and eight of the 2884 Class were renumbered into the 4800 range. To make way for these, the 4800 Class 0-4-2Ts were renumbered to the 1400 range. (In addition, five 4073 Castle Class and one 4300 Class 2-6-0 were converted, but not renumbered.) All engines were converted back to coal firing by 1950, and regained their original numbers. However, the 1400s were never renumbered back to 4800s.

=== Application by British Railways ===
When the GWR was nationalised as part of British Railways in 1948, its steam locomotives retained their numbers unchanged and new steam engines built to GWR designs continued to be allocated numbers in the same way as the GWR had done. However, its diesel locomotives were completely renumbered. They took numbers 15100-15107 in the 15xxx series allocated to pre-Nationalisation design diesel shunters.

- see: British Rail locomotive and multiple unit numbering and classification

=== Summary of post-1902 class numbering ===
GWR locomotive class numbering arranged by first and second digits
	Legend									
	NN00-NN99	Each section has a title showing the range of one hundred locomotive numbers it covers								
		If any locomotive classes used numbers in that range, there will be a section for each class, as follows								
	5700	First there is the number the class is known by (not necessarily in this range) linked to the appropriate article or article section								
	2161 ( > 4500)	If the class was later renumbered away from this range, the later number range will be bracketed after the number following a > sign, and the section will be shaded pink								
	(4800 > ) 1400	If the class was renumbered into this range, the earlier number range will be bracketed before the number preceding a > sign, and the section will be shaded blue								
	4-6-0 County (1945)	Next will come the wheel arrangement, with any name that the class (or sub-class) was known by								
	1901–1966	Finally there is the date range during which any of the class was numbered in this range								
	x0	x1	x2	x3	x4	x5	x6	x7	x8	x9
0x	0000–0099	0100–0199: 111; 4-6-2 The Great Bear; 1908–1924	0200–0299	0300–0399	0400–0499	0500–0599	0600–0699	0700–0799	0800–0899	0900–0999
1x	1000–1099: 1000; 4-6-0 County (1945); 1945–1964	1100–1199: 1101; 0-4-0T; 1926–1964	1200–1299	1300–1399: 1361; 0-6-0ST; 1910–1962; 1366; 0-6-0PT; 1934–1964	1400–1499: (4800 > ) 1400; 0-4-2T; 1946–1964	1500–1599: 1500; 0-6-0PT; 1949–1963	1600–1699: 1600; 0-6-0PT; 1949–1966	1700–1799	1800–1899	1900–1999
2x	2000–2099	2100–2199: 2161 ( > 4500); 2-6-2T; 1906–1912	2200–2299: 2221; 4-4-2T County Tank; 1905–1935; 2251; 0-6-0; 1930–1965	2300–2399	2400–2499	2500–2599	2600–2699: 2600; 2-6-0 Aberdare; 1901–1949	2700–2799: 2721; 0-6-0ST/PT; 1897–1950	2800–2899: 2800; 2-8-0; 1903–1965; 2884; 2-8-0; 1938–1965	2900–2999: 2900; 4-6-0-Saint; 1903–1953
3x	3000–3099: 3000; 2-8-0 ex-ROD; 1919–1958	3100–2199: 3100 ( > 5100); 2-6-2T; 1903–1927; 3150; 2-6-2T; 1906–1958; 3100 (1938); 2-6-2T; 1938–1960	3200–3299: 3292 ( > 4100); 4-4-0 Badminton; 1897–1912; 3200 ( > 9000); 4-4-0 Earl (Dukedog); 1936–1946; 2251; 0-6-0; 1946–1965	3300–3399: 3300 ( > 4100); 4-4-0 Badminton; ????–1912; 3373 ( > 4120); 4-4-0 Atbara; 1900–1912; 3300; 4-4-0 Bulldog; 19–19	3400–3499: 3400 ( > 4120); 4-4-0 Atbara; 19??–1912 (Note: Ten 34xx Atbaras were rebuilt as 37xx City class engines.); 3400 ( > 3700); 4-4-0 City; 1901–1912; 3400 ( > 3800); 4-4-0 County; 1904–1912; (3700 > ) 3400); 4-4-0 Bird; 1912–1951; 9400; 0-6-0PT; 1955–1964	3500–3599: 3521; 4-4-0 (Note: These started as 0-4-2T, then 0-4-4T!); 1887–1934; 3571; 0-4-2T; 1895–1949	3600–3699: 3600; 2-4-2T 'Birdcage'; 1902–1934; 5700; 0-6-0PT; 1938–1966	3700–3799: 3700 ( > 3400); 4-4-0 Bird; 1909–1912; (3400 > ) 3700; 4-4-0 City; 1912–1931; 5700; 0-6-0PT; 1936–1966	3800–3899: (3400 > ) 3800; 4-4-0 County; 1906–1933; 2884; 2-8-0; 1938–1965	3900–3999: 3901; 2-6-2T; 1907–1934; (4900 > ) 3900 ( > 4900); 4-6-0 Hall; 1946–1950 (Note: Eleven 4900 Class locomotives were temporarily renumbered into the 3900 range while they were converted to oil burning.)
4x	4000–4099: 4000; 4-6-0 Star; 1906–1957; 4073; 4-6-0 Castle; 1923–1964	4100–4199: 4101 > 4149; 4-4-0 Flower; 1910–1931; (3292,3300 > ) 4100; 4-4-0 Badminton; 1912–19??; (3373,3410 > ) 4120; 4-4-0 Atbara; 1912–1931; 5101; 2-6-2T; 1935–1965	4200–4299: 4200; 2-8-0T; 1910–1965	4300–4399: 4300; 2-6-0; 1911–1959	4400–4499: 4400; 2-6-2T; 1905–1955	4500–4599: (2161 > ) 4500; 2-6-2T; 1912–1964; 4575; 2-6-2T; 1927–1964	4600–4699: 4600; 4-4-2T; 1913–1925; 5700; 0-6-0PT; 1940–1966	4700–4799: 4700; 2-8-0; 1919–1964	4800–4899: 4800 ( > 1400); 0-4-2T; 1932–1946; (2800 > ) 4800 ( > 2800); 2-8-0; 1946–1950 (Note: Twelve 2800 Class locomotives were temporarily renumbered into the 4800 range while they were converted to oil burning.); (2884 > ) 4800 ( > 2884); 2-8-0; 1946–1949 (Note: Eight 2884 Class locomotives were temporarily renumbered into the 4800 range while they were converted to oil burning.)	4900–4999: 4900; 4-6-0 Hall; 1928–1965
5x	5000–5099: 4073; 4-6-0 Castle; 1926–1965	5100–5199: (3100 > ) 5100; 2-6-2T; 1927–1959; 5101; 2-6-2T; 1929–1964	5200–5299: 4200; 2-8-0T; 1922–1965; 5205; 2-8-0T; 1923–1965	5300–5399: 4300; 2-6-0; 1916–1964	5400–5499: 5400; 0-6-0PT; 1930–1963	5500–5599: 4575; 2-6-2T; 1927–1964	5600–5699: 5600; 0-6-2T; 1924–1966	5700–5799: 5700; 0-6-0PT; 1929–1963	5800–5899: 5800; 0-4-2T; 1933–1959	5900–5999: 4900; 4-6-0 Hall; 1931–1965
6x	6000–6099: 6000; 4-6-0 King; 1927–1962	6100–6199: 6100; 2-6-2T; 1931–1965	6200–6299	6300–6399: 4300; 2-6-0; 1920–1964	6400–6499: 6400; 0-6-0PT; 1932–1964	6500–6599	6600–6699: 5600; 0-6-2T; 1927–1965	6700–6799: 5700; 0-6-0PT "6700"; 1930–1965	6800–6899: 6800; 4-6-0 Grange; 1936–1965	6900–6999: 4900; 4-6-0 Hall; 1940–1965; 6959; 4-6-0 Modified Hall; 1944–1965
7x	7000–7099: 4073; 4-6-0 Castle; 1946–1965	7100–7199	7200–7299: 7200; 2-8-2T; 1934–1965	7300–7399: 4300; 2-6-0; 1921–1964	7400–7499: 6400; 0-6-0PT; 1936–1965	7500–7599	7600–7699	7700–7799: 5700; 0-6-0PT; 1930–1964	7800–7899: 7800; 4-6-0 Manor; 1938–1965	7900–7999: 6959; 4-6-0 Modified Hall; 1948–1965
8x	8000–8099	8100–8199: 5100; 2-6-2T "8100"; 1938–1965	8200–8299	8300–8399: 4300; 2-6-0 "8300"; 1927–1948	8400–8499: 9400; 0-6-0PT; 1949–1965	8500–8599	8600–8699	8700–8799: 5700; 0-6-0PT "8750"; 1930–1966	8800–8899	8900–8999
9x	9000–9099: (3200 > ) 9000; 4-4-0 Earl (Dukedog); 1946–1960	9100–9199	9200–9299	9300–9399: 4300 ( > 7300) (Note: These locomotives were all renumbered into the 7300 range when their weight distribution was changed in 1956-59.); 2-6-0; 1932–1959	9400–9499: 9400; 0-6-0PT; 1947–1965	9500–9599	9600–9699: 5700; 0-6-0PT; 1943–1966	9700–9799: 5700; 0-6-0PT "9700"; 1933–1966	9800–9899	9900–9999

== Classification ==
A very simple system was adopted, whereby the name (for broad-gauge locomotives) or number of the first locomotive in a class became the classification for all locomotives in that class (e.g. 'Sun Class', '4000 Class'). After the end of the broad gauge, names were applied to principal passenger and mixed-traffic standard-gauge locomotives. These were often based on a single theme, which could also lend its name to describe a class, for example 'Stars', also known as the '4000 Class', whose names included 'North Star', 'Rising Star' etc.

However, the classes of locomotives inherited at the Grouping in 1923 continued to be referred to by the classification allocated to them by their original owner.

== Other number series ==
In 1903, Churchward introduced the first steam rail motors, numbered 1 and 2. Construction continued until, by 1908, there were 99 consecutively-numbered rail motors in service.

In 1911, a single petrol-electric railcar was built, and given the number 100.

Collett experimented with a diesel railcar in 1933. Numbered 1, it was underpowered, but the results were sufficiently encouraging that further railcars with varying specifications followed, the fleet being numbered 1–38.

A number of diesel shunters were bought from 1933 on, and numbered 1, 2, and 501–507. These were renumbered to 15100–15107 by BR Western Region.

The GWR ordered two gas turbine locomotives in 1946, but neither was delivered until the GWR had given way to BR Western Region, which numbered them 18000 and 18100.

== See also ==
- Great Western Railway Power and Weight Classification
