= GWR 4300 Class =

Class of 342 two-cylinder 2-6-0 locomotives

Great Western Railway 4300 Class
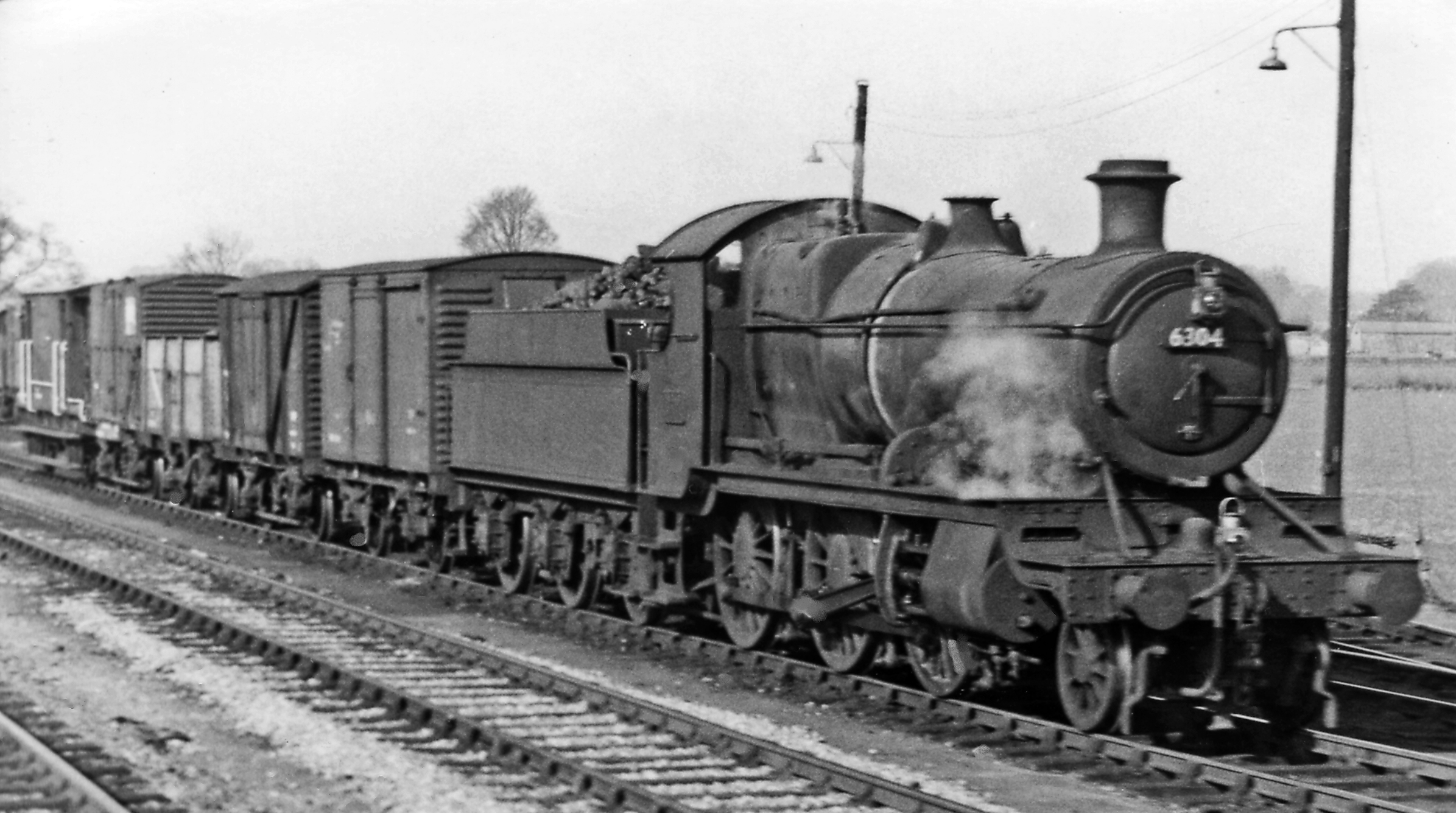
- 6304 at Over Junction, Gloucester, in 1962
Type and origin
- Power type: Steam
- Designer: George Jackson Churchward
- Builder: GWR Swindon Works (307); Robert Stephenson & Company (35)
- Order number: Lots 183, 193, 194, 198, 202, 204–209, 211, 212, 218, 222, 230, 276
- Serial number: Swindon: 2396–2415, 2516–2535, 2552–2571, 2612–2631, 2652–2761, 2790–2841, 2887–2906; RS&C: 3802–3836
- Build date: 1911–1932
- Total produced: 342
Specifications
- Configuration
  - Whyte: 2-6-0
  - UIC: 1′C h2
- Gauge: 4 ft 8 1/2 in (1,435 mm) standard gauge
- Leading dia.: 3 ft 2 in (0.965 m)
- Driver dia.: 5 ft 8 in (1.727 m)
- Minimum curve: 6 chains (400 ft; 120 m) normal, 5 chains (330 ft; 100 m) slow
- Length: 58 ft 1 1/4 in (17.71 m)
- Width: 8 ft 11 in (2.718 m)
- Height: 13 ft 0 in (3.962 m)
- Axle load: 17.60 long tons (17.88 t; 19.71 short tons)
- Adhesive weight: 52 long tons 0 cwt (116,500 lb or 52.8 t) (52.8 t; 58.2 short tons)
- Loco weight: 62 long tons 0 cwt (138,900 lb or 63 t) (63.0 t; 69.4 short tons)
- Tender weight: 40 long tons 0 cwt (89,600 lb or 40.6 t) (40.6 t; 44.8 short tons)
- Fuel capacity: 7 long tons 0 cwt (15,700 lb or 7.1 t) (7.1 t; 7.8 short tons)
- Water cap.: 3,500 imp gal (16,000 L; 4,200 US gal)
- Firebox
  - Grate area: 20.56 sq ft (1.910 m^{2})
- Boiler: GWR Standard No. 4
- Boiler pressure: 200 psi (1.38 MPa)
- Heating surface
  - Firebox: 128.72 sq ft (11.958 m^{2})
  - Tubes: 1,349.64 sq ft (125.386 m^{2})
- Superheater
  - Heating area: 191.88 sq ft (17.826 m^{2})
- Cylinders: Two, outside
- Cylinder size: 18 1/2 in × 30 in (470 mm × 762 mm)
Performance figures
- Tractive effort: 25,670 lbf (114.19 kN)
Career
- Operators: Great Western Railway, British Railways
- Power class: GWR: D; BR: 4MT
- Numbers: 4300–4399, 5300–5399, 6300–6399, 7300–7321, 9300–9319
- Axle load class: GWR: 4300–7300s Blue; 8300–9300s: Red
- Locale: Great Britain
- First run: 1911
- Withdrawn: 1936–1964
- Disposition: Two preserved, remainder scrapped

The GWR 4300 Class was a class of 2-6-0 steam locomotives, designed by George Jackson Churchward for the Great Western Railway for mixed traffic duties. A total of 342 were built between 1911 and 1932.

== Background ==
In 1906 Churchward fitted a more powerful Standard No. 4 boiler to his successful 3100 Class 2-6-2T to create the GWR 3150 Class. These showed themselves to be successful locomotives but their 65 long tons 0 cwt (145,600 lb or 66 t) weight and 2,000 imp gal (9,100 L; 2,400 US gal) water capacity meant that they tended to be restricted to suburban passenger traffic. Churchward was looking forward to the replacement of various of his predecessor's 2-4-0 classes on secondary duties. In 1911 he therefore designed a tender version of the 3150 class which would be suitable for a wide range of intermediate duties.

== Design ==
The class was ‘a total synthesis of standard parts, using the outside cylinders of the Saint, the wheels of ‘31XX’ 2-6-2 tank and the No. 4 boiler, in its superheated form.’ No prototype was required as the fundamental design had proved itself.

== Production series ==
The locomotives quickly proved themselves to be so useful that they were produced more or less continuously in a series of batches (or lots) over a twelve-year period (1911–1923), sometimes incorporating detailed differences. Two further lots were built in 1925 and 1932 by Churchward's successor, Charles Collett.

Table of orders and numbers
Year	Quantity	Lot No.	Works Nos.	Locomotive numbers	Notes
1911	20	183	Swindon 2396–2415	4301–4320	
1913	10	193	Swindon 2516–2525	4321–4330	
1913	10	194	Swindon 2526–2535	4331–4340	
1913–14	20	198	Swindon 2552–2571	4341–4360	
1915	20	202	Swindon 2612–2631	4361–4380	
1916	20	204	Swindon 2652–2671	4381–4399, 4300	
1916–17	10	205	Swindon 2672–2681	5300–5309	
1917	20	206	Swindon 2682–2701	5310–5329	
1917–18	20	207	Swindon 2702–2721	5330–5349	
1918–19	20	208	Swindon 2722–2741	5350–5369	
1919–20	20	209	Swindon 2742–2761	5370–5389	
1920–21	18	211	Swindon 2790–2817	5390–5399, 6300–6317	
1921	24	212	Swindon 2818–2841	6318–6341	
1923	20	216	Swindon 2887–2906	6342–6361	
1921–22	35	218	RS 3802–3836	6370–6399, 7300–7304	
1921–22	15	222	Swindon	7305–7319	
1925	10	230	Swindon	6362–6369, 7320–7321	
1932	20	276	Swindon	9300–9319	

=== Lot 183 ===
The first twenty examples, numbered 4301–4320, were delivered by Swindon Works between June and October 1911. These had inside steam pipes, and were among the first GWR locomotives to be fitted with top feed apparatus. Nos. 4311–4320 had boilers designed to operate at 225 psi (1.55 MPa) pressure but only 4315 and possibly 4316 ever worked at that pressure.

=== Lots 193, 194 and 198 ===
Three further batches, totalling a further forty locomotives (4321–4360) were built at Swindon and delivered June 1913 and May 1914, before the onset of the First World War impeded further production. These locomotives (and all subsequent examples) had frames lengthened by 9 in (229 mm) at the rear to give better access for maintenance as well as providing more room in the cab.

=== Lots 202 and 204 to 208 ===
The class proved to be ‘just the type that was needed during the 1914–18 war and were accordingly built in considerable numbers during that period.’ Six batches, totalling one hundred locomotives (numbered 4361–4399, 4300, 5300–5359) were built between May 1915 and September 1918, and a further ten (5360–5369) between January and June 1919. From 1917 detailed changes were made to the design giving better weight distribution between the wheels which were later applied to other members of the class. Eleven examples of the class were transported to France during World War I in the service of the Railway Operating Division of the British Army and these were 5319–5326 and 5328–5330. One survives in preservation.

=== Lots 209, 211, 212, 216, and 230 ===
The first three of these lots were for seventy locomotives built between June 1919 and July 1921 (Nos. 5370–99 and 6300–6341). Lot 216 was for a further 28 locomotives (6342–6369) but Swindon works was then unable to keep pace with the demand for them and only the first twenty were completed after delay, between March and December 1923. The remainder (6362–6369 and 7320/1) were later built under lot 230 in 1925. 6320 was converted to oil firing between 1947 and the equipment was removed in 1949.

=== Lots 218 and 222 ===
As Swindon works could not keep pace an order was placed with Robert Stephenson and Company in 1921 for fifty locomotives (Nos. 6370–6399 and 7300–7319). The first 35 of these (Lot 218) were built by the company between April 1921 and January 1922. The remaining fifteen were built at Swindon from parts manufactured by RSH between November 1921 and January 1922. In 1925 Nos. 7300–7304 were modified for better balance and had detail alterations.

=== Lot 276 ===
In 1932, Collett built a further twenty examples (9300–9319) to a modified design with side window cabs, outside steam pipes and a screw reverse. He also extended the frames, increasing the weight to 65 long tons 0 cwt (145,600 lb or 66 t) (72.8 short tons), which placed them in the Red band of route availability. After passing into British Railways ownership, these locomotives were modified back to light buffer beam design and were renumbered 7322–7341 between 1956 and 1959.

== 8300 Class ==
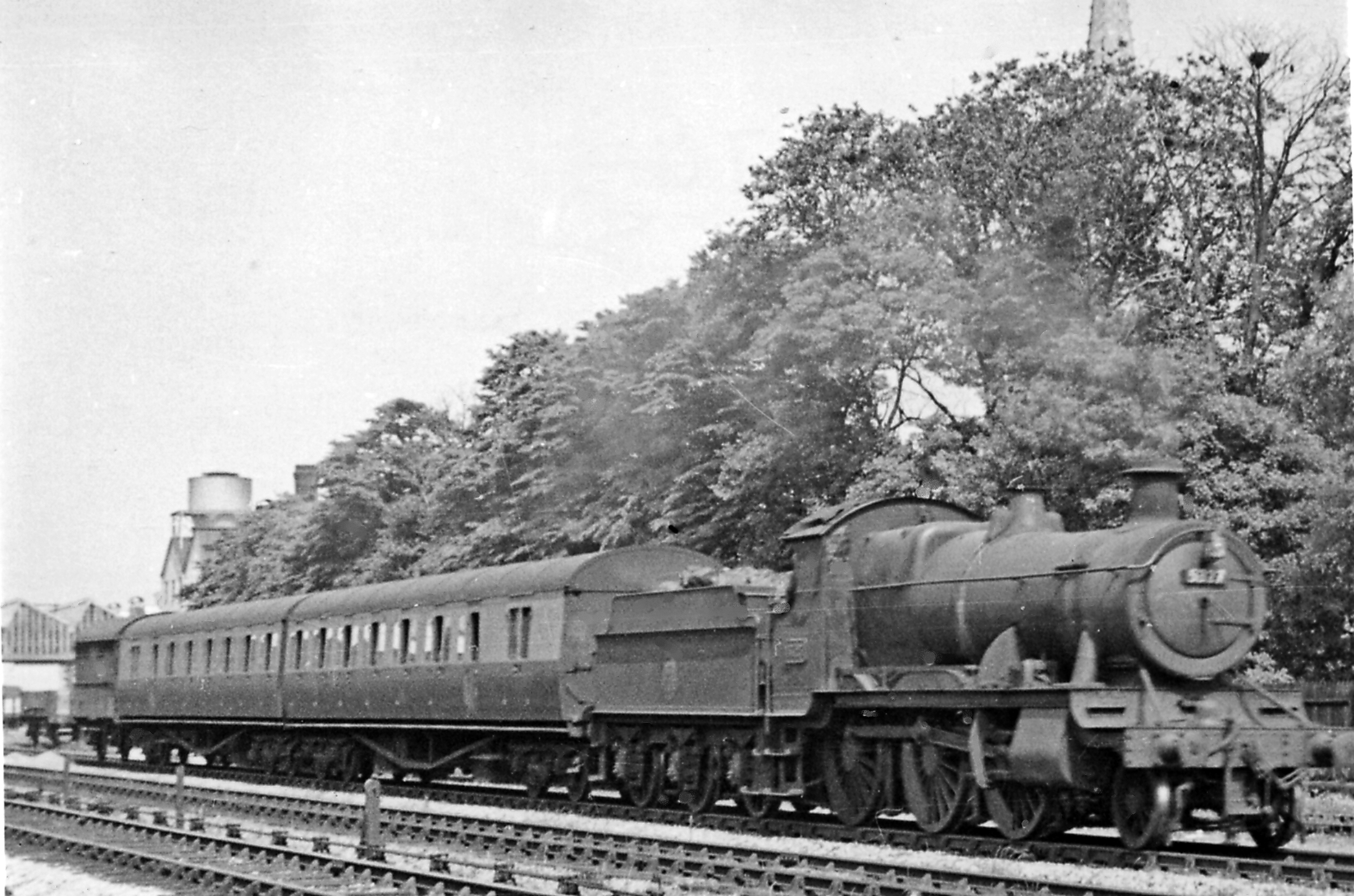
No. 5327 at Swindon 11 June 1950 (modified to the heavier version as No. 8327 1928–1944).

The class were widely used in Devon and Cornwall where the track had many sharp curves. It was found that flange wear on the leading driving wheels became excessive as a result of these bends. In November and December 1927 additional weight was added to the front end of four examples so that the pony truck would be forced to impart more side thrust to the main frames on bends. These locomotives reverted to their original state, but between January and March 1928, 65 engines of 5300 series received additional weight on the pony truck, and 3000 was added to their running numbers, temporarily creating an ‘8300 Class’. However, the additional weight placed them in the Red category of route availability. From 1944 onwards there was a shortage of locomotives in the Blue category and so the additional weights were removed and the surviving locomotives resumed their original running numbers. The last to be returned to its original condition was 8393 in September 1948.

== Use ==
The 4300 Moguls were the maids of all work on the GWR network and later the Western Region of British Railways. Employing a Standard number 4 boiler and the support struts similar to those fitted to the '2800' class, the class very quickly earned an excellent reputation in its ability to handle most types of traffic, from local stopping goods to main line expresses. According to O.S. Nock they "could handle the heavy goods work as well as the 'Aberdares' and could run up to 70 mph with passenger trains, in other words they were the ideal mixed traffic locomotive".

=== Oil firing ===
Between 1945 and 1947, coal shortages caused the GWR to experiment with oil fired locomotives and alongside a number of Castle, Hall, 2800 and 2884 class locomotives, a single 4300, No. 6320, was converted to oil burning in March 1947. The experiment, encouraged by the government was abandoned in 1948 once the extra maintenance costs were calculated and the bill had arrived for the imported oil. No. 6320 was converted back to burn coal in August 1949.

== Withdrawal ==
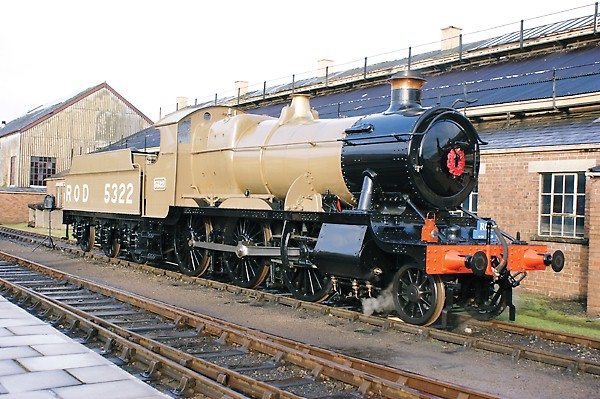
5322 preserved in WWI Railway Operating Division khaki livery

Although the class continued to be very useful and the final batch were still relatively new, 100 of the earlier examples were withdrawn between 1936 and 1939 and the wheels and motion of eighty were used for the Grange Class and twenty for Manor Class engines. It was intended to replace the whole class in this way but the advent of the Second World War in 1939 brought a temporary halt to withdrawals and the programme was never revived. Further withdrawals resumed in 1948 under British Railways ownership, but the last six examples survived until 1964.

== Accidents and incidents ==
- On 13 October 1928, locomotive No. 6381 was hauling a freight train that was run into by a passenger train at Charfield, Gloucestershire due to the driver of the passenger train overrunning signals. Sixteen people were killed and 41 were injured.
- On 1 March 1937, a 4300 Class locomotive hauling a freight train that was in collision with a passenger train at Langley, Buckinghamshire. One person was killed and six were injured.
- On 7 September 1945, locomotive No. 6315 was hauling a mail and freight train that was derailed near Sun Bank Halt, Denbighshire due to the trackbed being washed away following the failure of the bank of the Shropshire Union Canal. One person was killed and two were injured. The train's consist, except for a brake van, was destroyed in the ensuing fire.
- In 1952, locomotive No. 7311 overran a signal and was derailed by trap points at Appleford, Oxfordshire.
- On 6 September 1956, locomotive No. 9306 was hauling a parcels train that overran signals and ran into the rear of an express passenger train at Ludlow, Shropshire.

== Preservation ==
Two examples have been preserved:

Note: Loco numbers in bold are their current number

Number		Builder	Built	Withdrawn	Location	Current status	Image	Notes
Original	Later	Builder	Built	Withdrawn	Location	Current status	Image	Notes
**5322**	8322	Swindon Works	August 1917	April 1964	Didcot Railway Centre	On static display		One of 11 locos exported to France in World War I. Painted in British Railways black with early crest. Withdrawn in Summer 2014 with boiler problems.
9303	**7325**	Swindon Works	February 1932	April 1964	Severn Valley Railway	In store		Operational 1992 - 2002, moved to Bridgnorth Shed for restoration assessment December 2025

5322 is the older of the two as it was built in 1917, during the Great War, at Swindon Works. It was sent, with several other members of the class, to France for hauling munitions and hospital trains. There it was painted in War Department livery and given the number ROD5322. Demobbed in 1919 at Chester it returned to the GWR fleet until it was withdrawn from service in April 1964. It was sent to Woodham Brothers scrapyard in Barry, South Wales. The first Barry locomotive to be subject to a preservation fund, it was the third locomotive to leave Woodham's: 5322 thus ended up as the sole early 43xx to be preserved. It was initially restored to working order, but was not steamed after 1975 until returning to steam in 2008 at the Didcot Railway Centre, restored to its 1919 War Department condition.

9303 is one of the final batch of 342 locomotives built between 1911 and 1932. They were built with larger cabs and had a weight attached to the buffer beam to place more weight on the leading pony wheels. This was done to reduce the wear on the leading driving wheels. In 1958 the weight was removed from the buffer beam to give the locomotive more route availability. At the same time it was renumbered 7325.

An engine similar to the 4300 class was rebuilt from 5193 (a GWR 5101 Class 2-6-2T) to become a smaller boilered version of the class numbered 9351.

== Model railways ==
Mainline Railways updated their OO gauge Mogul Class 4300 models in 1983, introducing models in GWR green and BR lined green.

Dapol released a OO gauge model in 2020 and are following up with an N gauge version in the near future.

Danish manufacturer Heljan produced an O gauge model of the 4300 class in 2019.

== See also ==
- List of GWR standard classes with two outside cylinders
