= GWR 2602 Class =

Class of British steam locomotives

GWR 2602 'Kruger' Class
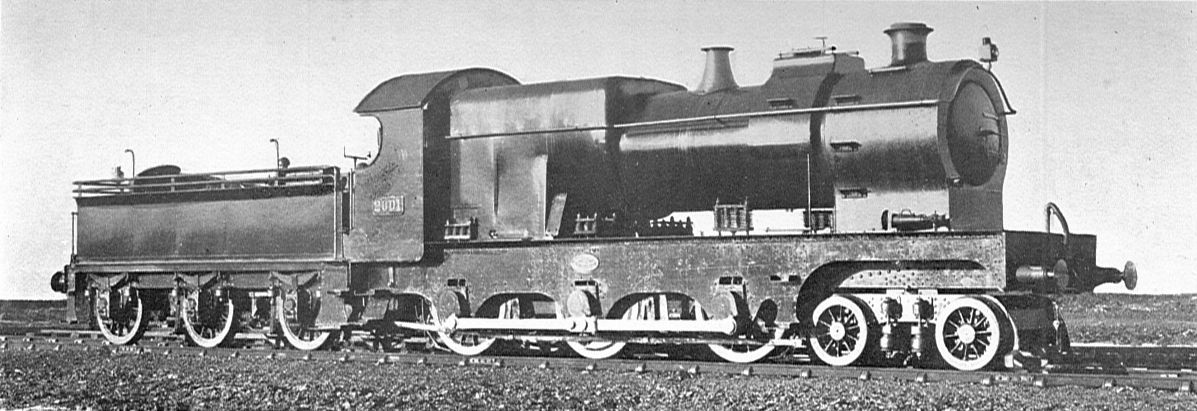
- No. 2601, the Kruger 4-6-0
Type and origin
- Power type: Steam
- Designer: William Dean
- Builder: GWR Swindon Works
- Order number: 116
- Serial number: 1723, 1724–1732
- Build date: 1899–1903
Specifications
- Configuration
  - Whyte: 4-6-0 (1); 2-6-0 (9)
- Gauge: 4 ft 8 1/2 in (1,435 mm) standard gauge
- Leading dia.: 2 ft 8 in (0.813 m)
- Driver dia.: 4 ft 7 1/2 in (1.410 m)
- Boiler pressure: 180 psi (1,200 kPa)
- Cylinders: 2
- Cylinder size: 19 in × 28 in (483 mm × 711 mm)
Career
- Operators: Great Western Railway
- Numbers: 2601, 2602–2610

The 2602 Class was a series of steam locomotives designed by William Dean and built at the Swindon Works of the Great Western Railway.

The GWR 2602 Class was designed to be a versatile and powerful locomotive, suitable for both passenger and freight services.

== Design ==
They had outside frames for the six-coupled driving wheels but inside frames for the leading wheels. Initially, a distinctive visual feature was a large saddle-shaped sandbox over the first ring of the boiler. The class had two prototypes: No. 2601, which was a 4-6-0, while No. 2602 was a 2-6-0. These were built in 1899, and Nos. 2603-2610 followed later up to 1903, all 2-6-0. Though Dean was officially still in charge, Churchward's influence is evident in the rugged design. Their perhaps ironic nickname was after Paul Kruger, the Boer War leader defeated by Lord Roberts in 1900.

== Problems ==
The somewhat experimental class was not successful; the boiler's high pressure and 3 ft 6 in (1.067 m) long combustion chamber gave trouble and the long 28-inch (711 mm) stroke of the inside cylinders led to fractures of the solid crank axles. The class was thus short-lived, and most were withdrawn around 1906. Several of the boilers were converted for stationary use in Swindon Works at reduced pressure and remained in service there until the 1950s.

== Aberdare class ==
Their numbers were adopted in 1907 by some of the last batch of the popular and reliable Aberdare Class 2-6-0s, which may also have re-used some of the "Kruger"s' parts.

== Sources ==
- Allcock, N. J.; Davies, F. K.; le Fleming, H. M.; Maskelyne, J. N.; Reed, P. J. T.; Tabor, F. J. (1968) [1951]. White, D. E. (ed.). The Locomotives of the Great Western Railway, part one: Preliminary Survey. Kenilworth: RCTS.
- Holcroft, Harold (1971) [1957]. An Outline of Great Western Locomotive Practice 1837-1947. Shepperton, Surrey: Ian Allan. ISBN 0-7110-0228-2.
- le Fleming, H. M. (October 1954). White, D. E. (ed.). The Locomotives of the Great Western Railway, part seven: Dean's Larger Tender Engines. RCTS. ISBN 0-901115-18-5. OCLC 655235293.
