= GWR 4200 Class =

Class of 2-8-0T steam locomotives

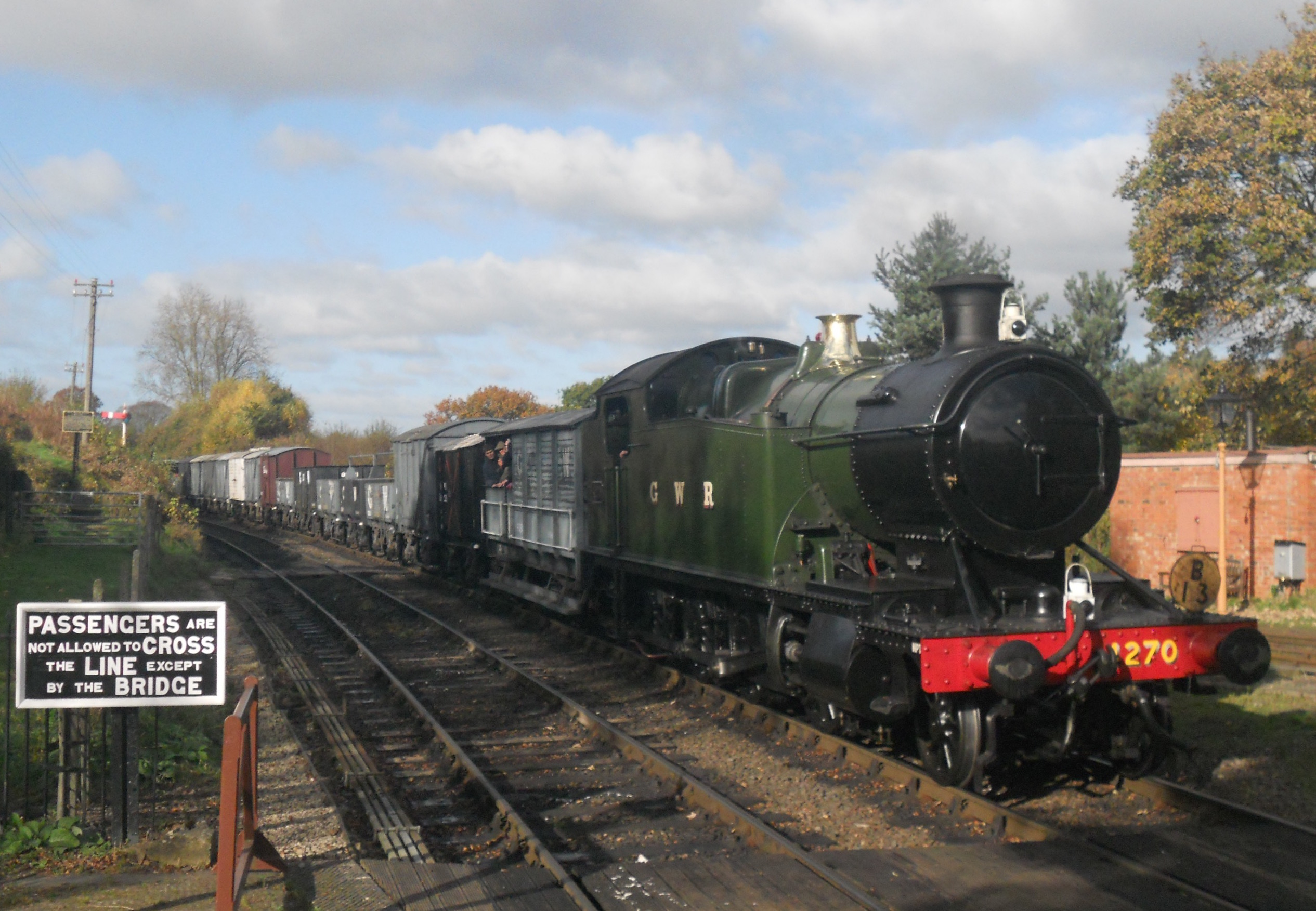
- 4270 at Arley on the Severn Valley Railway in 2016
Type and origin
- Power type: Steam
- Designer: G. J. Churchward
- Builder: GWR
- Order number: Lots 182, 187, 196, 200, 203, 213, 220
- Build date: 1910–1923
- Total produced: 105
Specifications
- Configuration
  - Whyte: 2-8-0T
- Gauge: 4 ft 8 1/2 in (1,435 mm) standard gauge
- Leading dia.: 3 ft 2 in (965 mm)
- Driver dia.: 4 ft 7 1/2 in (1,410 mm)
- Minimum curve: 2 chains (130 ft; 40 m)
- Length: 40 ft 9 in (12.421 m)
- Width: 8 ft 11 in (2.718 m)
- Height: 12 ft 10 1/16 in (3.913 m)
- Loco weight: 81 long tons 12 cwt (182,800 lb or 82.9 t) (82.9 t; 91.4 short tons)
- Fuel type: Coal
- Fuel capacity: 4 long tons (4.1 t; 4.5 short tons)
- Water cap.: 1,800 imp gal (8,200 L; 2,200 US gal)
- Boiler: GWR Standard No. 4
- Boiler pressure: 200 psi (1.38 MPa)
- Cylinders: Two, outside
- Cylinder size: 18 1/2 in × 30 in (470 mm × 762 mm)
Performance figures
- Tractive effort: 31,450 lbf (139,900 N)
Career
- Power class: GWR: D BR: 7F
- Numbers: 4200–4299, 5200–5204
- Axle load class: GWR: Red
- Locale: Great Western Railway, British Railways
- Withdrawn: 1937–1939, 1959–1965
- Disposition: 14 rebuilt as 7200 Class; 5 preserved; remainder scrapped

The Great Western Railway (GWR) 4200 Class is a class of 2-8-0T steam locomotives.

== History ==
=== Development ===
After the GWR took over operations and then absorbed the various South Wales based railways from the late 1800s, operational practice on most was defined by moving heavy coal trains on sharp, steep and undulating tracks. Thus many of these railways - especially the dominant Taff Vale Railway - specified and used an 0-6-2T, which gave maximum tractive effort whilst riding well on the undulating track.

With coal trains increasing in size and scale, the GWR needed to develop a more powerful locomotive to meet these requirements, on what were relatively short haul routes. Thus in 1906, Chief Engineer George Jackson Churchward took the basic design of his GWR 2800 Class, and adapted it. After proposing a 2-8-2T design, Churchward developed the UK's first 2-8-0 tank engine, through concerns that the longer frames required for a 2-8-2T would restrict operation in the South Wales Valleys.

Churchward upgraded the power of the design, modifying the frames to hold a GWR standard No.4 boiler over the 2800 Class standard No. 1. The flanges of the second and third driving wheels were made thinner, and the coupling rods between the third and fourth sets of driving wheels used spherical joints, all to create side play and hence flexibility in operations. The prototype No. 4201 was out shipped from Swindon Works in 1910 under Lot No. 142, with a straight back bunker capable of containing three tonnes of coal. In 14 months of testing, it easily proved itself capable of negotiating curves down to 2 chains (130 ft; 40 m) in radius.

Table of orders and numbers
Year	Quantity	Lot No.	Works No.	Locomotive numbers	Notes
1910	1	182	2395	4201	
1912–13	20	187	2446–2465	4202–4221	
1913	10	196	2541–2550	4222–4231	
1914	10	200	2587–2596	4232–4241	
1916–17	20	203	2632–2651	4242–4261	
1919–20	24	213	2842–2865	4262–4285	
1921–23	20	220	—	4286–4299, 5200–5204, 4200	

=== Operations ===
Put into production in 1912 under Lot No. 187, the first locomotives were Nos. 4202 to 4221, which had both top feed boilers and curved upper bodies to their coal bunkers to provide 3.5 tonnes of coal carrying capacity. Working heavy coal trains of over 1,000 tons through the South Wales Valleys, from coal mines to ports, the large boilers and restricted loading gauge resulted in narrow side tanks. Although passing numerous water stops along their routes, because of the class's heavy water consumption and limited tank capacity, they were nicknamed "Water Carts". 105 4200s were built between 1910 and 1923.

=== Modifications ===
In 1919, from Lot No. 213 (4262 to 4285) onwards, the coal bunker was built six inches taller, increasing coal capacity to 4 tons. In 1921, having also run out of allocation numbers, the class received its first major upgrade. Increasing cylinder diameter from 18.5 inches (470 mm) to 19 inches (480 mm) increased tractive effort to 33,170 lbf (147.5 kN), thus forming the later GWR 5205 Class.

The last batch of the 5205 Class produced pre-World War II were lot No. 266 of 1930, producing numbers 5275 to 5294. However, due to the Stock Market Crash of 1929, and a resultant down turn in coal exports to Europe, a number of the 4200 Class having been returned to Swindon for overhaul, had in fact been stored there. To increase their operational ability across the wider GWR network, Chief Engineer Charles Collett took the board-agreed decision to alter this batch to 2-8-2T by adding a bolt-on 4 feet (1.22 m) frame extension to accommodate a rear trailing axle, raising their coal capacity to 6 long tons (6.1 t; 6.7 short tons) and water to 2,500 imp gal (11,000 L; 3,000 US gal), forming the GWR 7200 Class.

The Operational Department demanded more 7200 locomotives, so 14 of the stored 4200 Class locomotives at Swindon were rebuilt as such between 1937 and 1939. Although operationally banned from certain goods yards, most 7200's found work across the GWR system, mostly deployed on iron ore and stone trains from Banbury.

In later years many of the remaining 4200s were upgraded to 5205 specification with outside steam pipes, larger cylinders and in some cases curved frames at the front end.

=== Withdrawal ===
All but one, No. 4224, passed in the ownership of British Railways on Nationalisation. The first engine withdrawn was number 4224 in February 1959 and by the end of steam on the former GWR system, 18 were still working at the start of 1965, the last withdrawn being No. 4268 in August 1965.

== Preservation ==
Five have been preserved, all taken from Woodham Brothers scrapyard in Barry, Vale of Glamorgan, South Wales. Three of the five have run in preservation.

Number	Year Built	Withdrawn	Location	Status	Photograph	Notes
4247	Mar 1916	Apr 1964	Dartmouth Steam Railway	Operational		In 5205 specification, outside steampipes but straight footplate. Left Barry in April 1985. It is the oldest survivor of its class in preservation marking its centenary in Mar 2016. Overhaul to commence at East Somerset Railway before moving to the Dartmouth Steam Railway.
4248	Apr 1916	May 1963	Swindon Steam Railway Museum	Static museum exhibit		In 5205 specification. Left Barry in May 1986. Conserved rather than restored, on show dismantled as if it were "in the Swindon Works."
4253	Mar 1917	Apr 1963	Kent and East Sussex Railway	Under restoration		Has 5275 style footplate with a raised section over the cylinders. Left Barry in August 1987, stored at Pontypool and Blaenavon Railway until 2011, then sold to group from K&ESR.
4270	Dec 1919	Sept 1962	Gloucestershire Warwickshire Railway	Stored awaiting overhaul		Retains original inside steam pipes. Left Barry in July 1985, owned by Jeremy Hosking.
4277 Hercules	Apr 1920	Jun 1964	Dartmouth Steam Railway	Operational		Retains original inside steam pipes. Left Barry in June 1986. Was named Hercules in preservation on 1 August 2008, after being sold to the Dartmouth Steam Railway.

== Models ==
In 2012, Hornby released models of the 4200 class in both original GWR green and BR black. The GWR green version was a DCC-ready model of locomotive No. 4283, as it appeared between 1934 and 1942.

== See also ==
- List of GWR standard classes with two outside cylinders
