= GWR 4200 Class 4277 =

GWR No.4277 ‘Hercules’
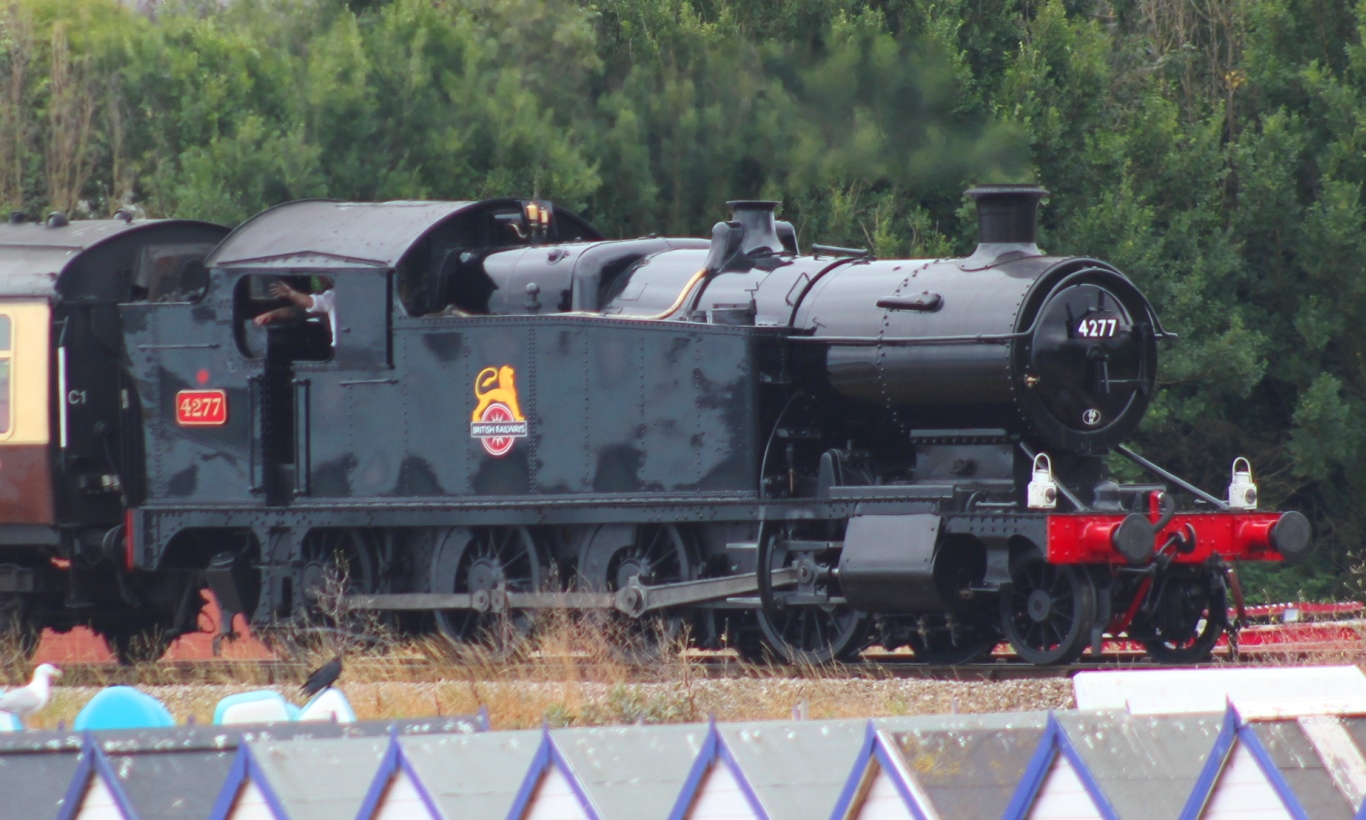
- GWR 2-8-0T Class 42xx No. 4277 Hercules at Paignton Station on the Dartmouth Steam Railway.
Type and origin
- Power type: Steam
- Builder: GWR Swindon Works
- Order number: Lot 213
- Serial number: Swindon 2857
- Build date: 1920
Specifications
- Configuration
  - Whyte: 2-8-0T
- Gauge: 4 ft 8 1/2 in (1,435 mm) standard gauge
- Leading dia.: 3 ft 2 in (965 mm)
- Driver dia.: 4 ft 7 1/2 in (1,410 mm)
- Length: 40 ft 9 in (12.421 m)
- Width: 8 ft 11 in (2.718 m)
- Height: 12 ft 10 1/16 in (3.913 m)
- Loco weight: 81 long tons 12 cwt (182,800 lb or 82.9 t) (82.9 t; 91.4 short tons)
- Fuel type: Coal
- Fuel capacity: 4 long tons (4.1 t; 4.5 short tons)
- Water cap.: 1,800 imp gal (8,200 L; 2,200 US gal)
- Boiler: GWR Standard No. 4
- Boiler pressure: 200 psi (1.38 MPa)
- Cylinders: two outside
- Cylinder size: 18 1/2 in × 30 in (470 mm × 762 mm)
Performance figures
- Tractive effort: 31,450 lbf (139,900 N)
Career
- Operators: GWR, BR Western Region
- Class: 4200 Class
- Power class: GWR: D BR: 7F
- Numbers: 4277
- Locale: Great Western Railway, British Railways
- Withdrawn: 1964

Great Western Railway (GWR) 4200 Class No. 4277 is a preserved British steam locomotive. In preservation it has carried the name Hercules.

== Service ==
No. 4277 was built at the GWR's Swindon Works in 1920, on Lot No. 213, Works No. 2857. It was painted in unlined green livery with "Great Western" on the tank sides. From 1934 a round GWR logo replaced the lettering, and this in turn was replaced in 1942 by the letters "G W R". In 1948 the locomotive passed into British Railways (BR) ownership and was given the power classification 7F. In BR ownership the livery was unlined black. It spent most of its working life in South Wales on freight trains and was withdrawn in 1964 from Aberbeeg Shed (BR shed code 86H) after 44 years of service.

== Preservation ==
4277 was moved to Woodham Brothers scrapyard in Barry, Glamorgan shortly after withdrawal and remained there for 20 years until 1986 when it was privately purchased.

In 2008 it was sold to the Dartmouth Steam Railway. The locomotive was then painted in lined GWR Brunswick Green livery. On 1 August 2008 it was named Hercules, the nameplates being located on the smokebox. The nameplates are historically inauthentic for this locomotive. After being withdrawn in February 2018 due to expiry of its boiler ticket, it was reintroduced on service in 2022 with unlined BR black livery.

The name Hercules was carried by three GWR locomotives, a broad gauge locomotive of the Hercules Class, the later 3031 Class No. 3043 and No. 16, one of the GWR 0-6-4 crane tanks.
