= GWR 2800 Class 2807 =

Preserved British 2-8-0 locomotive

2807
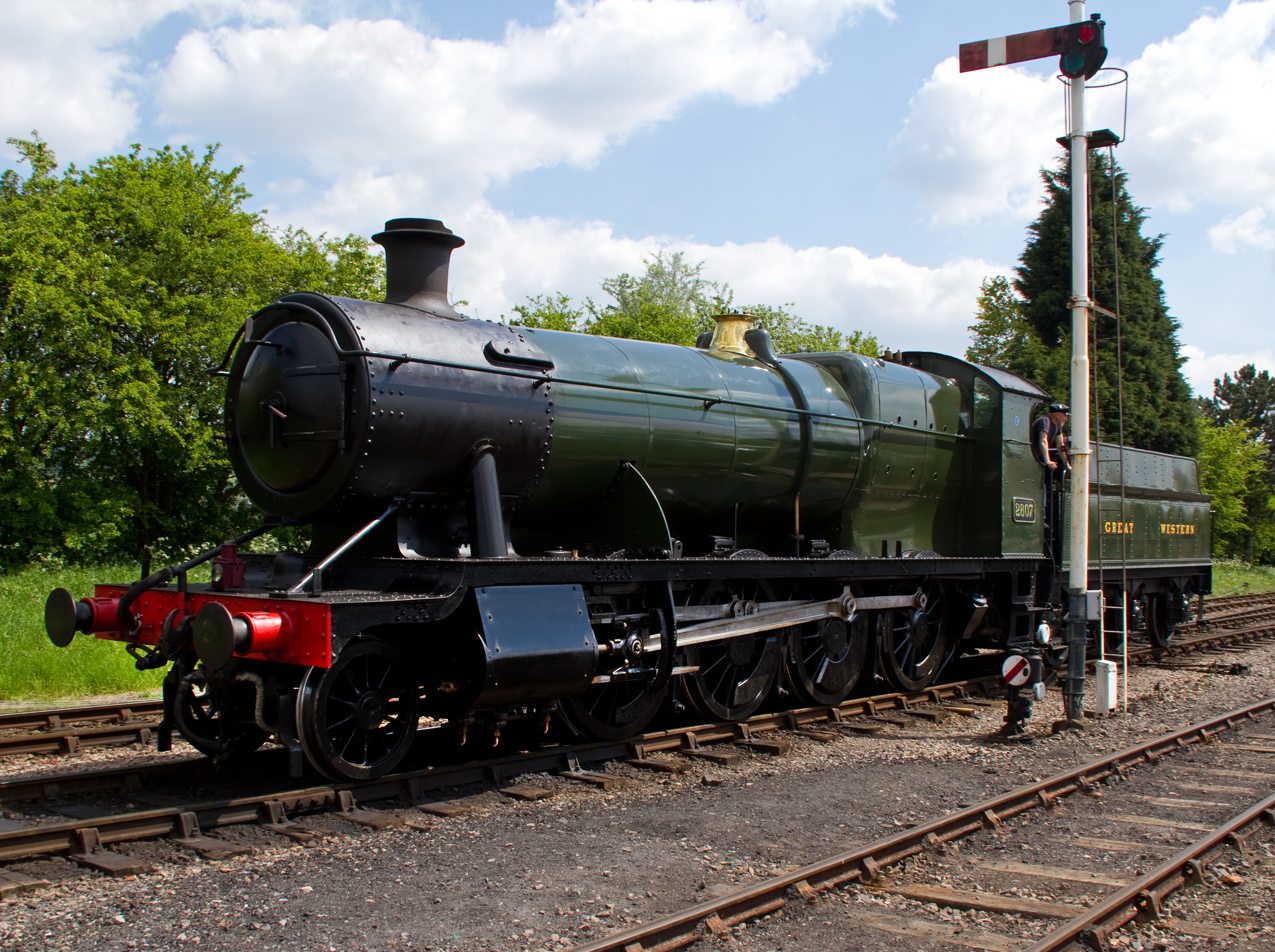
- No. 2807 at Toddington
Type and origin
- Power type: Steam
- Builder: GWR Swindon Works
- Order number: Lot 153
- Serial number: 2102
- Build date: August 1905
Specifications
- Configuration
  - Whyte: 2-8-0
- Gauge: 4 ft 8 1/2 in (1,435 mm) standard gauge
Career
- Operators: Great Western Railway, British Railways
- Class: GWR 2800 Class
- Numbers: 2807
- Withdrawn: 1963
- Current owner: Cotswold Steam Preservation Ltd.

GWR 2800 Class No. 2807 is one of the surviving members of the Great Western Railway's 2800 Class of 2-8-0 steam locomotives, which are also known as the 28XX class.

No. 2807 was completed in August 1905 and not withdrawn until March 1963, completing over 58 years of service. No. 2807 arrived at Woodham Brothers scrapyard in Barry, Vale of Glamorgan, South Wales during November 1963.

Over 17 years later, in 1981, it was saved and moved to Toddington railway station on the Gloucestershire Warwickshire Railway and restored to steam in 2010. The locomotive performed well for its ten-year ticket, which expired at the end of 2019, after which, it received a full overhaul at Toddington, with the engine resteaming in September 2023, before returning to service in October.

2807 holds multiple records due to its age: it is the oldest surviving 2800-class locomotive, the oldest locomotive built by the Great Western Railway which is now privately owned, and the oldest locomotive saved from Woodham Brothers scrapyard at Barry, Wales.

GWR 2800 Class 2807
