= GWR 3600 Class =

Class of British steam locomotives

GWR 3600 class
Type and origin
- Power type: Steam
- Designer: William Dean
- Builder: Swindon Works
- Order number: Lots 130, 134, 143
- Build date: 1900–1903
- Total produced: 31
Specifications
- Configuration
  - Whyte: 2-4-2T
  - UIC: 1′B1′
- Gauge: 4 ft 8 1/2 in (1,435 mm) standard gauge
- Leading dia.: 3 ft 8 in (1.118 m)
- Driver dia.: 5 ft 2 in (1.575 m)
- Trailing dia.: 3 ft 8 in (1.118 m)
- Fuel type: Coal
- Fuel capacity: 3 long tons (3.0 t; 3.4 short tons)
- Water cap.: 1,900 imp gal (8,600 L; 2,300 US gal)
- Boiler: GWR Standard No. 3
- Boiler pressure: 200 lbf/in^{2} (1.38 MPa)
- Cylinders: Two, inside
- Cylinder size: 17 in × 24 in (432 mm × 610 mm)
Performance figures
- Tractive effort: 19,020 lbf (84.61 kN)
Career
- Operators: Great Western Railway
- Withdrawn: October 1930 – November 1934
- Disposition: All scrapped

The Great Western Railway (GWR) 3600 Class was a class of 2-4-2T side tank steam locomotive, designed by William Dean and built at Swindon in three lots in 1900-1903:

== History ==
Dean had built an experimental 2-4-2T numbered 11, whose success led to the cancellation of another batch of 2-4-0 "Metro" Tanks and the construction of the 3600s in their place. The new 2-4-2Ts had 5 ft 2 in (1.575 m) coupled wheels and 17 in × 24 in (432 mm × 610 mm) cylinders. The second batch were slightly longer than the prototype, resulting in greater tank capacity, and the third lot, delivered under Churchward, were slightly larger again, and had taper boilers. The class gained the nickname "Birdcage" due to their (for the GWR) unusually spacious cabs.

Table of orders and numbers
Year	Quantity	Lot No.	Serial Nos.	Locomotive numbers	Notes
1900	1	130	1907	11	renumbered 3600 in 1912
1902	20	134	1866–1885	3601–3620	Serial numbers out of sequence
1903	10	143	2013–2022	3621–3630	

== Use ==
The 3600 class were fitted with steam reversing gear, steam brakes, and two steam-operated water pick-ups for forward and reverse working. This reflects their intended work as fast suburban engines. About half were employed on such duties in the Birmingham area. The rest worked in the London area, though later a few worked Chester-Birkenhead trains, and some were allocated to South Wales sheds. They were essentially passenger train locomotives, and were eventually superseded by Collett's 2-6-2Ts. All were withdrawn and scrapped between 1930 and 1934.
