= GWR 2884 Class =

Class of 2-8-0 steam locomotive

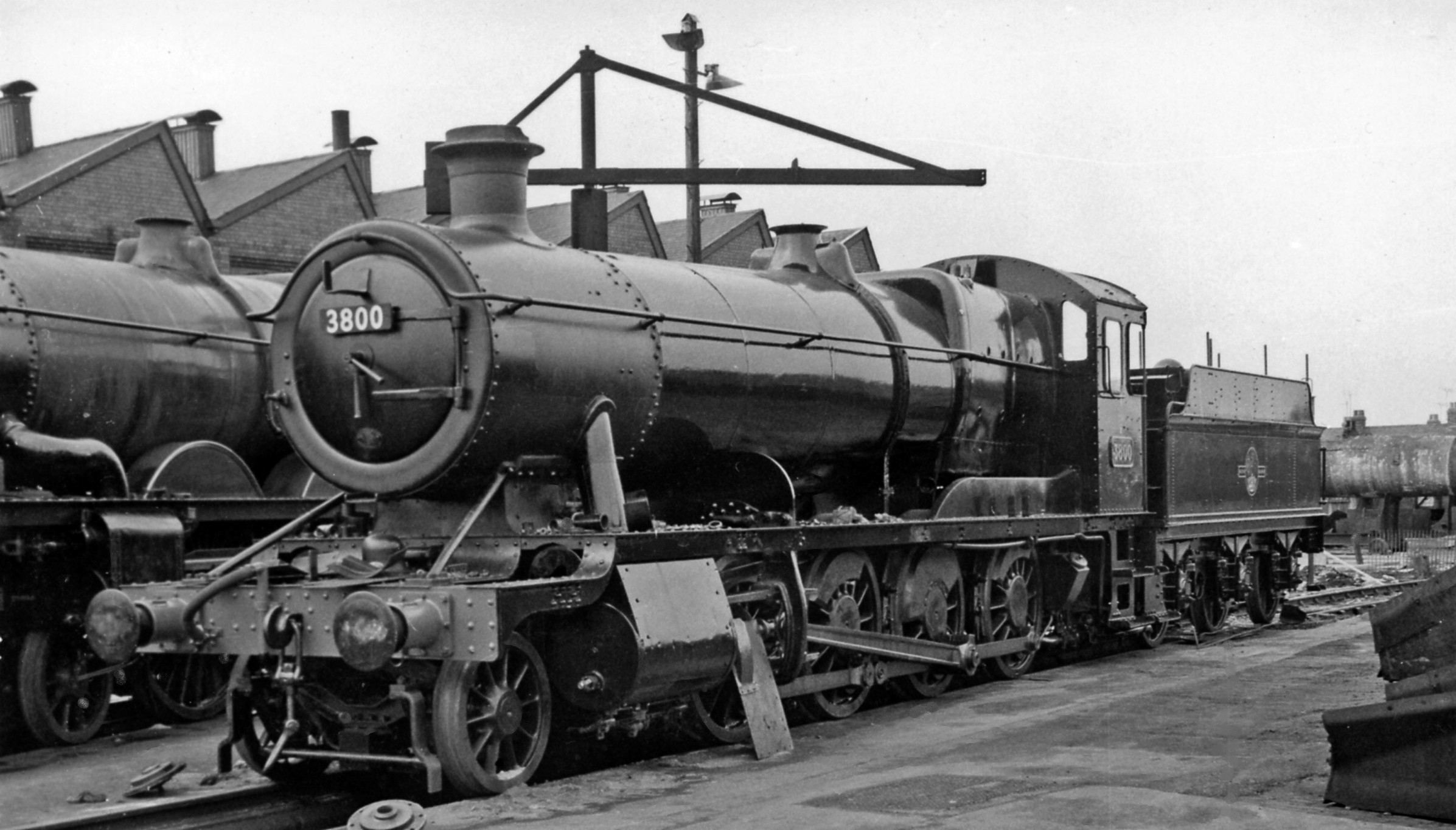
- 3800 at Swindon Works in 1962
Type and origin
- Power type: Steam
- Designer: Charles Collett
- Builder: GWR Swindon Works
- Order number: Lots 321, 328, 334, 341, 346
- Build date: 1938–1942
- Total produced: 83
Specifications
- Configuration
  - Whyte: 2-8-0
  - UIC: 1'D h2
- Gauge: 4 ft 8 1/2 in (1,435 mm) standard gauge
- Leading dia.: 3 ft 2 in (0.965 m)
- Driver dia.: 4 ft 7 1/2 in (1.410 m)
- Minimum curve: 7 chains (460 ft; 140 m) normal, 6 chains (400 ft; 120 m) slow
- Length: 63 ft 2 1/4 in (19.26 m)
- Width: 8 ft 11 in (2.718 m)
- Height: 13 ft 0 in (3.962 m)
- Axle load: 17 long tons 0 cwt (38,100 lb or 17.3 t) (19.0 short tons) full
- Adhesive weight: 67 long tons 0 cwt (150,100 lb or 68.1 t) (75.0 short tons) full
- Loco weight: 76 long tons 5 cwt (170,800 lb or 77.5 t) (85.4 short tons) full
- Tender weight: 40 long tons 0 cwt (89,600 lb or 40.6 t) (44.8 short tons) full
- Fuel type: Coal
- Water cap.: 3,500 imperial gallons (16,000 L; 4,200 US gal)
- Firebox
  - Grate area: 27.07 sq ft (2.515 m^{2})
- Boiler pressure: 225 psi (1.55 MPa)
- Heating surface
  - Firebox: 154.78 sq ft (14.380 m^{2})
  - Tubes: 1,686.60 sq ft (156.690 m^{2})
- Superheater
  - Type: 4 or 6 element
  - Heating area: 4-element: 191.8 sq ft (17.82 m^{2}), 6-element: 253.38 sq ft (23.540 m^{2})
- Cylinders: Two, outside
- Cylinder size: 18 1/2 in × 30 in (470 mm × 762 mm)
- Valve gear: Stephenson
- Valve type: piston valves
Performance figures
- Tractive effort: 35,380 lbf (157.4 kN)
Career
- Operators: GWR » BR
- Class: 2884
- Power class: GWR: E BR: 8F
- Numbers: 2884–2899,3800-3866 : GWR/BR
- Axle load class: GWR: Blue
- Withdrawn: 1962–1965
- Disposition: Nine preserved, remainder scrapped

The Great Western Railway (GWR) 2884 Class is a class of 2-8-0 steam locomotive. They were Collett's development of Churchward's earlier 2800 Class and are sometimes regarded as belonging to that class.

== History ==
The 2884s were designed for heavy freight work and differed from the original Class 2800 engines (Nos. 2800–2883) in a number of respects, the most obvious being that a more modern Collett side window cab was provided and that they were built with outside steam pipes.

=== Production ===
83 of the 2884 class were built between 1938 and 1941. Those built during the Second World War did not have the side window to the cab, and the side window on the others was plated over. This was to reduce glare, as a precaution against enemy air attacks. The windows were reinstated after the war.

Table of orders and numbers
Year	Quantity	Lot No.	Locomotive numbers	Notes
1938–39	20	321	2884–2899, 3800–3803	
1939–40	20	328	3804–3823	
1940–41	10	334	3824–3833	
1941–42	10	341	3834–3843	
1942	23	346	3844–3866	

The locomotives were so popular with the ex-Great Western crews that the British Railways Western Region operating authorities wanted more of the class built after nationalisation in 1948; however, this request was turned down in favour of BR Standard Class 9Fs.

=== Oil firing ===
Between 1945 and 1947, coal shortages caused GWR to experiment with oil fired 2800 locomotives. Eight of the 2884 class were converted and renumbered from 4850. The experiment, encouraged by the government was abandoned in 1948 once the extra maintenance costs were calculated and the bill had arrived for the imported oil.

=== 1948 Locomotive Exchange Trials ===
The year 1948 also saw one of the 2884 class, No.3803 (now preserved), emerge remarkably successfully from the 1948 Locomotive Exchange Trials against more modern engines including the LMS Stanier Class 8F and the WD Austerity 2-8-0 and WD Austerity 2-10-0. It took the appearance in 1954 of the British Railways BR Standard Class 9F 2-10-0 to displace the 2800s from their main role of mineral haulage. Nevertheless, there was still work for them right up to the end of steam on the Western region in 1965. Six decades of service testify to the fundamental excellence of Churchward's original conception.

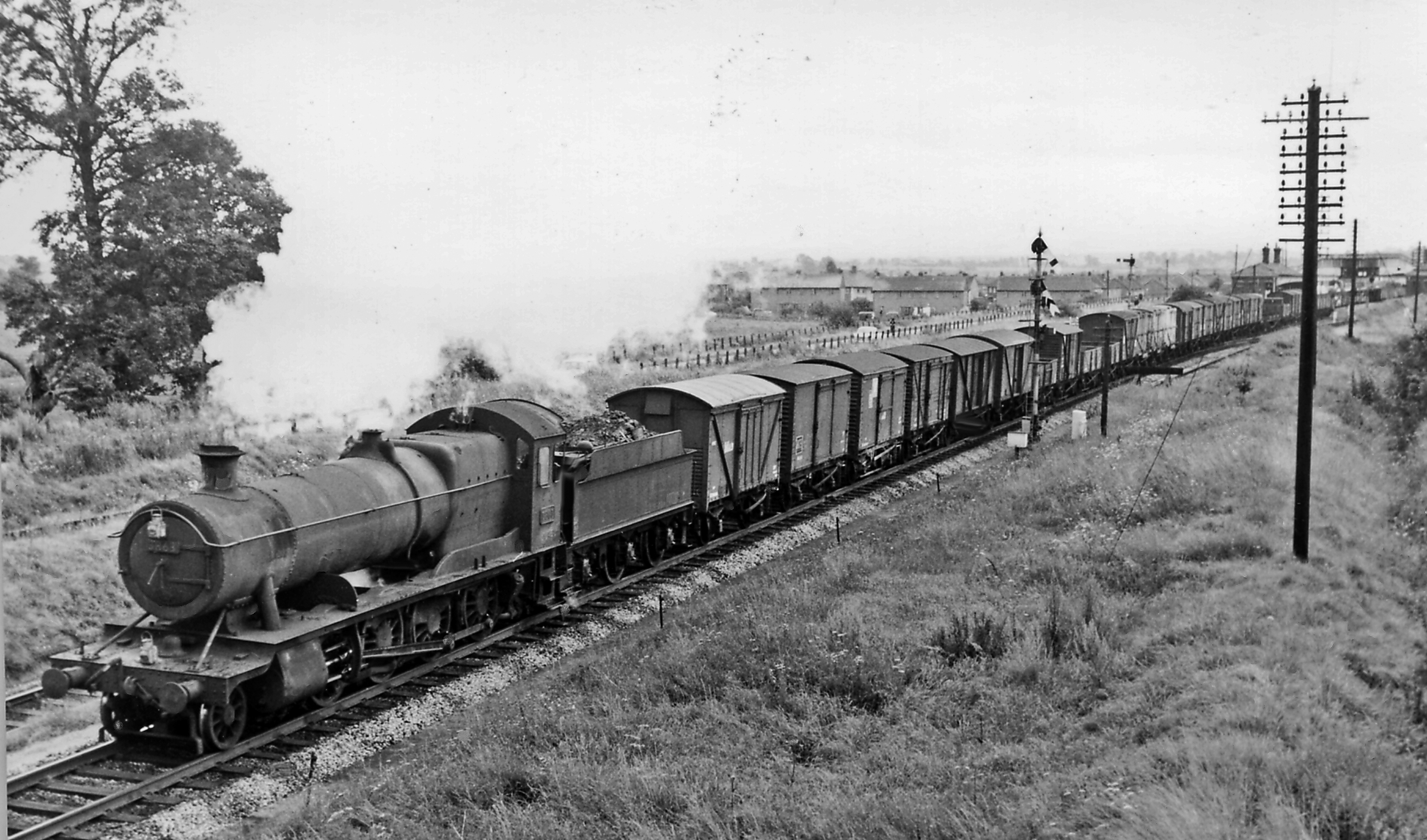
No. 3863 on a down freight west of Patchway 12 August 1963

== Withdrawal ==
Table of withdrawals
Year	Quantity in service at start of year	Quantity withdrawn	Cumulative quantity withdrawn	Locomotive numbers
1962	83	1	1	3827.
1963	82	16	17	2888–89/92/94/97–98, 3803/06/11/31/33/39/43/46/53/58.
1964	66	32	49	2884–87/91/93/96, 3800–01/04–05/09–10/14–15/19/21–22/24–25/28–29/32/34/38/41/45/47/52/56–57/60.
1965	34	34	83	2890/95/99, 3802/07–08/12–13/16–18/20/23/26/30/35–37/40/42/44/48–51/54–55/59/61–66.

== Preservation ==
Nine examples of the 2884 class, were saved from Woodham Brothers scrapyard in Barry, Vale of Glamorgan, South Wales and four of these engines have operated in preservation.

Number	Year Built	Withdrawn	Location	Status	Image	Notes
2885	Mar 1938	Jan 1964	Tyseley Locomotive Works	Undergoing restoration as of 2026		On static display at Birmingham Moor Street station between 2003 and 2013.
3802	Dec 1938	Aug 1965	Llangollen Railway	Operational, boiler ticket expires: 2027.		Currently paired with a 4,000 gallon Collett tender instead of the usual 3,500 gallon Churchward tender. Returned to service following an overhaul in January 2018 and now operational at Llangollen.
3803	Jan 1939	Jul 1963	Dartmouth Steam Railway	Undergoing Overhaul		Previously based at the South Devon Railway, but now sold to the Dartmouth Steam Railway.
3814	Mar 1940	Dec 1964	Northern Steam Engineering Limited, Stockton-on-Tees	Undergoing restoration		Under restoration to running condition (as of 2026). Previously at the North Yorkshire Moors Railway (1986–2014) and Llangollen Railway (2016–2018), then moved to its current location in 2018.
3822	Apr 1940	Jan 1964	Didcot Railway Centre	Static display		Awaiting overhaul after being withdrawn from traffic in 2010. In 1989, 3822 was used in the Music video of the song Breakthru by the band Queen.
3845	Apr 1942	Jun 1964	Private site near Evesham	Stored awaiting restoration as of 2026		Owned by Dinmore Manor Locomotive Ltd.
3850	Jun 1942	Aug 1965	Gloucestershire Warwickshire Railway	Operational, boiler ticket expires: 2034		Originally restored at and operated at the West Somerset Railway, now moved to Gloucestershire Warwickshire Railway. Returned to service following an overhaul in August 2024
3855	Oct 1942	Aug 1965	East Lancashire Railway	Undergoing restoration as of 2026		Being restored from ex Barry scrapyard condition.
3862	Nov 1942	Feb 1965	Private site	Unknown as of 2026		Under restoration at the Northampton and Lamport Railway until moving away in 2024.

== Models ==
Hornby Railways manufacture a model of the 2884 Class in OO gauge.

In 2013, Dapol introduced a British N gauge model of locomotive 2892 in GWR green livery.

== See also ==
- List of GWR standard classes with two outside cylinders
