= GWR 7200 Class =

Class of 2-8-2 tank engines

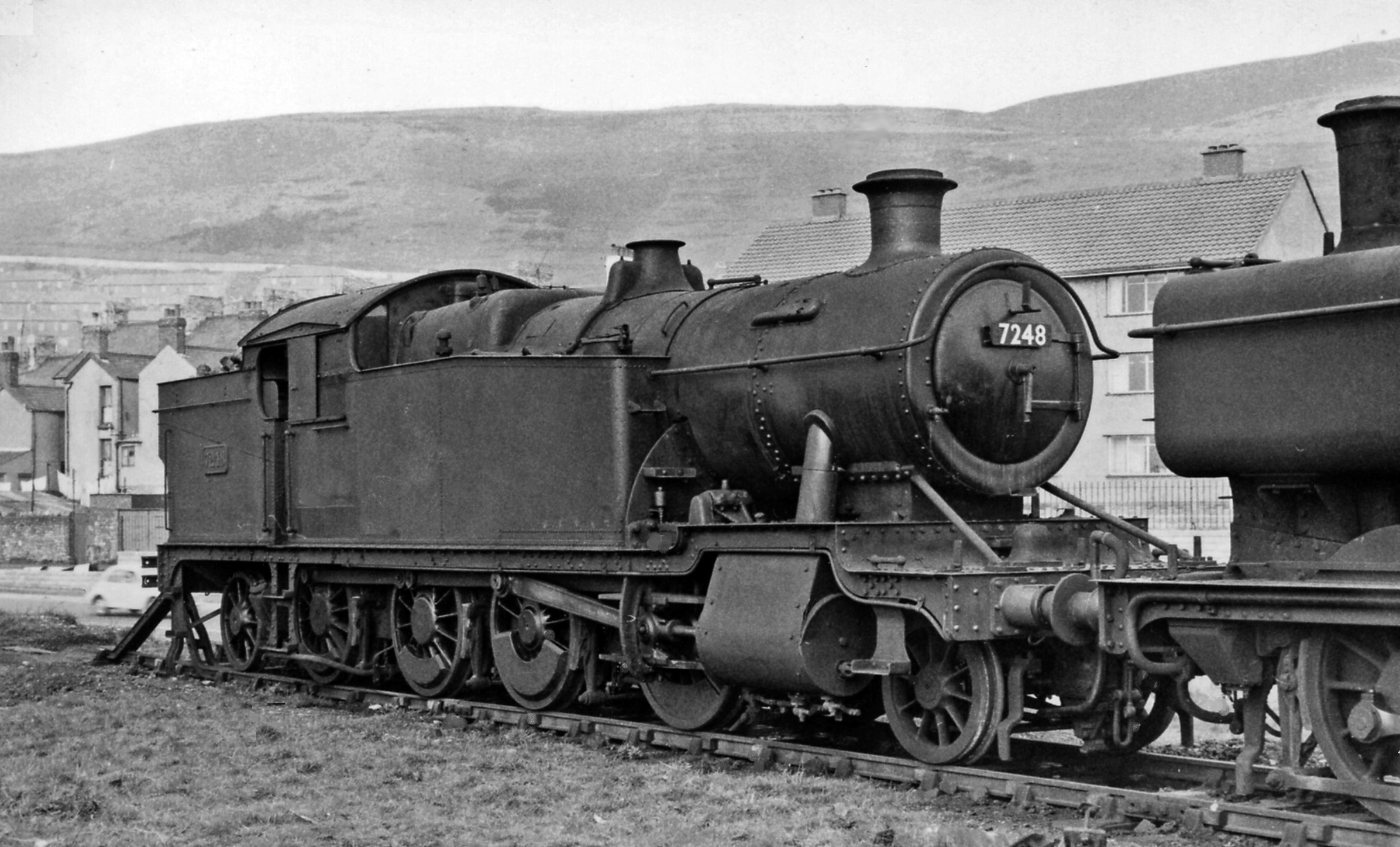
- 7248 in 1962
Type and origin
- Power type: Steam
- Designer: Charles Collett (Rebuilds)
- Order number: Lot 266 (7200–7219); Lot 233 (7220–7239); Lot 318 (7240–7253)
- Rebuilder: GWR Swindon Works
- Rebuild date: July 1934–December 1939
- Number rebuilt: 54
Specifications
- Configuration
  - Whyte: 2-8-2T
  - UIC: 1′D1′ h2t
- Gauge: 4 ft 8 1/2 in (1,435 mm) standard gauge
- Leading dia.: 3 ft 2 in (0.965 m)
- Driver dia.: 4 ft 7 1/2 in (1.410 m)
- Trailing dia.: 3 ft 8 in (1.12 m)
- Length: 44 ft 10 in (13.67 m)
- Width: 8 ft 11 in (2.72 m)
- Height: 12 ft 10 1/16 in (3.91 m)
- Loco weight: 92 long tons 12 cwt (207,400 lb or 94.1 t) (103.7 short tons)
- Fuel type: Coal
- Fuel capacity: Standard bunker: 6 long tons (6.1 t; 6.7 short tons); Coal Scuttle' bunker: 5 long tons (5.6 short tons; 5.1 t)
- Water cap.: Standard bunker: 2,400 imp gal (11,000 L; 2,900 US gal); Coal Scuttle' bunker: 2,700 imp gal (12,000 L; 3,200 US gal)
- Firebox
  - Grate area: 20.56 sq ft (1.910 m^{2})
- Boiler: GWR Standard No. 4
- Boiler pressure: 200 lbf/in^{2} (1.38 MPa)
- Heating surface
  - Firebox: 128.72 sq ft (11.958 m^{2})
  - Tubes and flues: 1,349.64 sq ft (125.386 m^{2})
- Superheater
  - Heating area: 191.79 sq ft (17.818 m^{2})
- Cylinders: Two, outside
- Cylinder size: 19 in × 30 in (483 mm × 762 mm)
- Valve gear: Stephenson
- Valve type: Piston valves
Performance figures
- Tractive effort: 33,170 lbf (147.5 kN)
Career
- Operators: GWR » BR
- Class: 7200
- Power class: GWR: E BR: 8F
- Number in class: 30
- Axle load class: Red
- Withdrawn: 1962–1965
- Disposition: Three under restoration, remainder scrapped

The Great Western Railway (GWR) 7200 Class is a class of 2-8-2T steam locomotive. They were the only 2-8-2Ts built and used by a British railway, and the largest tank engines to run on the Great Western Railway.

== Rebuild and operation ==
Originally, the 4200 class and 5205 class 2-8-0T were introduced for short-haul Welsh coal traffic, but the stock market crash of 1929 saw coal traffic dramatically fall. Built specifically for the short runs of heavy trains in the South Wales Coalfield, Charles Collett chose to rebuild some of them with extended coal bunkers (and thus greater range and usefulness) by adding 4 feet (1.22 m) to the frames, requiring a trailing axle making them 2-8-2T.

Rebuilt at Swindon Works, the first to be converted was 5275 (lot 266) which returned to traffic numbered 7200 in August 1934. A photograph of the prototype was taken on 27 July 1934 outside Swindon Works 'A Shop'. Nos. 5276–5294 were similarly rebuilt between August and November 1934, becoming 7201–7219, and Nos. 7220–7239 were rebuilt from 5255 to 5274 between August 1935 and February 1936; with both batches, the rebuilding was not in numerical order, but the new numbers were in the same sequence as the old. The 5205s had flat running boards to set them apart from the 5275s. Nos. 7240–7253, rebuilt August 1937–December 1939, were selected at random from locomotives numbered in the 4200 series, them all gaining 5275-styled running boards and cylinders (19”). This last batch of conversions had been authorised on Lot 318.

Class	Original	Rebuilt	Rebuild date
5205	5275	7200	August 1934
5205	5276	7201	August–November 1934
5205	5277	7202	August–November 1934
5205	5278	7203	August–November 1934
5205	5279	7204	August–November 1934
5205	5280	7205	August–November 1934
5205	5281	7206	August–November 1934
5205	5282	7207	August–November 1934
5205	5283	7208	August–November 1934
5205	5284	7209	August–November 1934
5205	5285	7210	August–November 1934
5205	5286	7211	August–November 1934
5205	5287	7212	August–November 1934
5205	5288	7213	August–November 1934
5205	5289	7214	August–November 1934
5205	5290	7215	August–November 1934
5205	5291	7216	August–November 1934
5205	5292	7217	August–November 1934
5205	5293	7218	August–November 1934
5205	5294	7219	August–November 1934
5205	5255	7220	August 1935–February 1936
5205	5256	7221	August 1935–February 1936
5205	5257	7222	August 1935–February 1936
5205	5258	7223	August 1935–February 1936
5205	5259	7224	August 1935–February 1936
5205	5260	7225	August 1935–February 1936
5205	5261	7226	August 1935–February 1936
5205	5262	7227	August 1935–February 1936
5205	5263	7228	August 1935–February 1936
5205	5264	7229	August 1935–February 1936
5205	5265	7230	August 1935–February 1936
5205	5266	7231	August 1935–February 1936
5205	5267	7232	August 1935–February 1936
5205	5268	7233	August 1935–February 1936
5205	5269	7234	August 1935–February 1936
5205	5270	7235	August 1935–February 1936
5205	5271	7236	August 1935–February 1936
5205	5272	7237	August 1935–February 1936
5205	5273	7238	August 1935–February 1936
5205	5274	7239	August 1935–February 1936
4200	4239	7240	August 1937–December 1939
4200	4220	7241	August 1937–December 1939
4200	4202	7242	August 1937–December 1939
4200	4204	7243	August 1937–December 1939
4200	4216	7244	August 1937–December 1939
4200	4205	7245	August 1937–December 1939
4200	4234	7246	August 1937–December 1939
4200	4244	7247	August 1937–December 1939
4200	4249	7248	August 1937–December 1939
4200	4209	7249	August 1937–December 1939
4200	4219	7250	August 1937–December 1939
4200	4240	7251	August 1937–December 1939
4200	4210	7252	August 1937–December 1939
4200	4245	7253	August 1937–December 1939

In 1937 the "scuttle" bunkers were fitted to the final fourteen of 42xx rebuilds (7240–53). This bunker modification consisted of a higher rivet line increasing the class's water capacity by an extra 200/300 gallons however reducing the coal capacity by 1 ton. These new bunkers were later fitted to a random handful of the class outside this batch including No. 7200, No. 7201, No. 7210 and No. 7239 during their heavy overhauls. No. 7200 is the only surviving loco of its class to have this unique feature.

The 54 rebuilt locos found work in most parts of the GWR system, where their 92 long tons 12 cwt (207,400 lb or 94.1 t) weight was allowed, although the rebuilt chassis length did get them banned from certain goods yards. Many found work in the home counties, deployed on iron ore and stone trains from Banbury. Many would find work in South Wales on coal traffic after WWII, especially when British Railways was formed, with 2884 and Standard 9F class engines taking over for them.

On 17 May 1941 No. 7238 ran into a bomb crater at Budbrook, near Hatton on the Banbury to Wolverhampton line.

== Withdrawal ==
The first member of the class to be withdrawn was number 7241 in November 1962, whilst the last four engines in traffic served until June 1965. Four of the class were bought by Woodham Brothers scrapyard in Barry, Vale of Glamorgan, and No. 7226 was scrapped there in 1965.

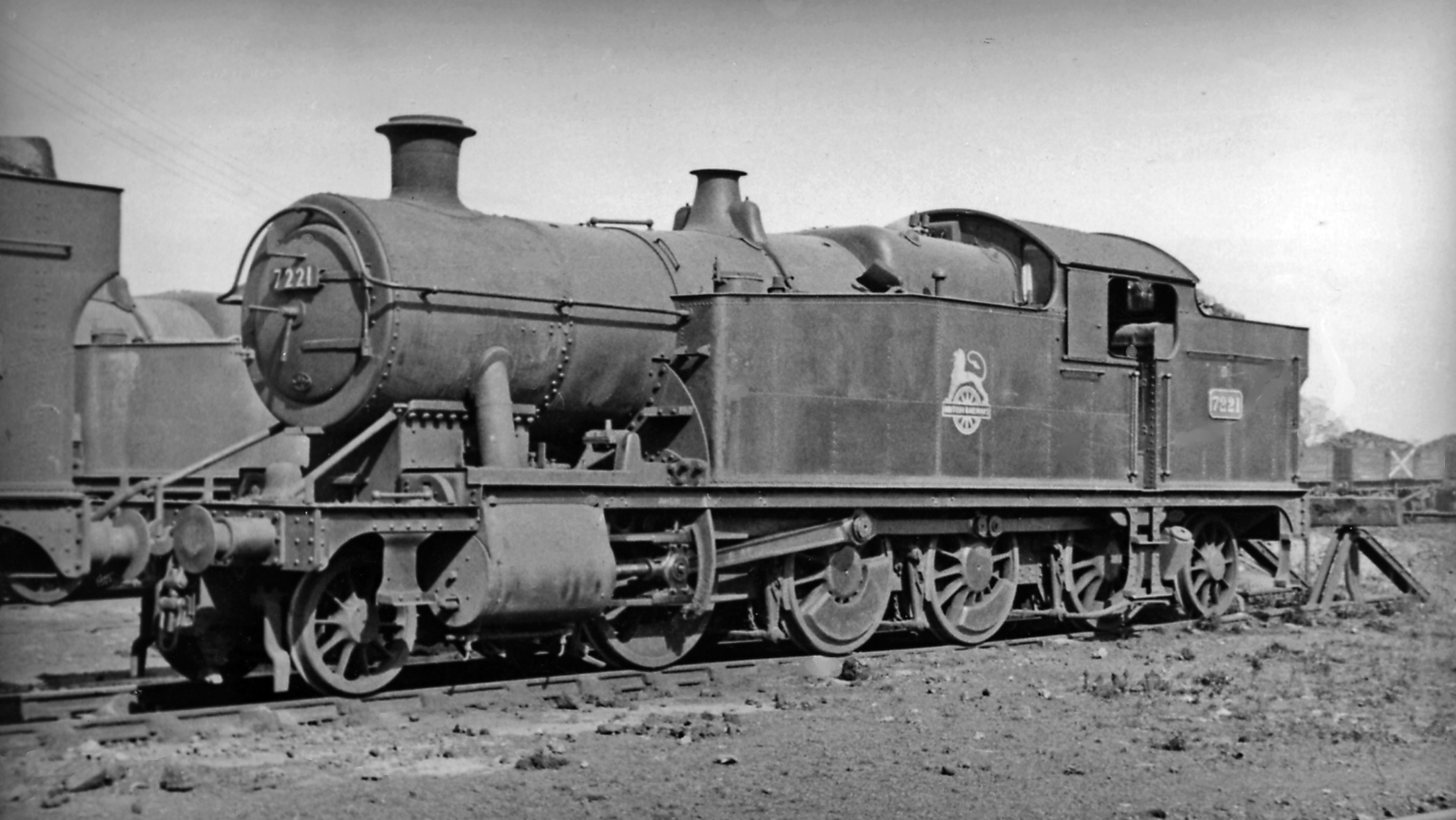
No. 7221, a converted 5205

== Preservation ==
Three locomotives survive, all recovered from Woodham Brothers, though none have yet been returned to operational condition. However, in November 2020, the Buckinghamshire Railway Centre announced that a major milestone was reached with No. 7200.

Both No. 7200 and No. 7202 are nearing completion of their overhauls although substantial funding is required for the remaining boiler repairs on both locomotives.

Current Number	Year Built	Withdrawn	Location	Status	Photograph	Notes
No. 7200	1930 as No. 5275 (Rebuilt No. 7200 in 1934)	Jul 1963	Buckinghamshire Railway Centre	Under Restoration		Left Barry Island September 1981. Scuttle Bunker fitted.
No. 7202	1930 as No. 5277 (Rebuilt No. 7202 in 1934)	Jun 1964	Didcot Railway Centre	Under Restoration		Left Barry Island in April 1974.
No. 7229	1926 as No. 5264 (Rebuilt No. 7229 in 1935)	Aug 1964	East Lancashire Railway	Awaiting Restoration		Left Barry Island in October 1984.

== Models ==
In 2012, Hornby released models of the 7200 class in both the original GWR green and BR black.

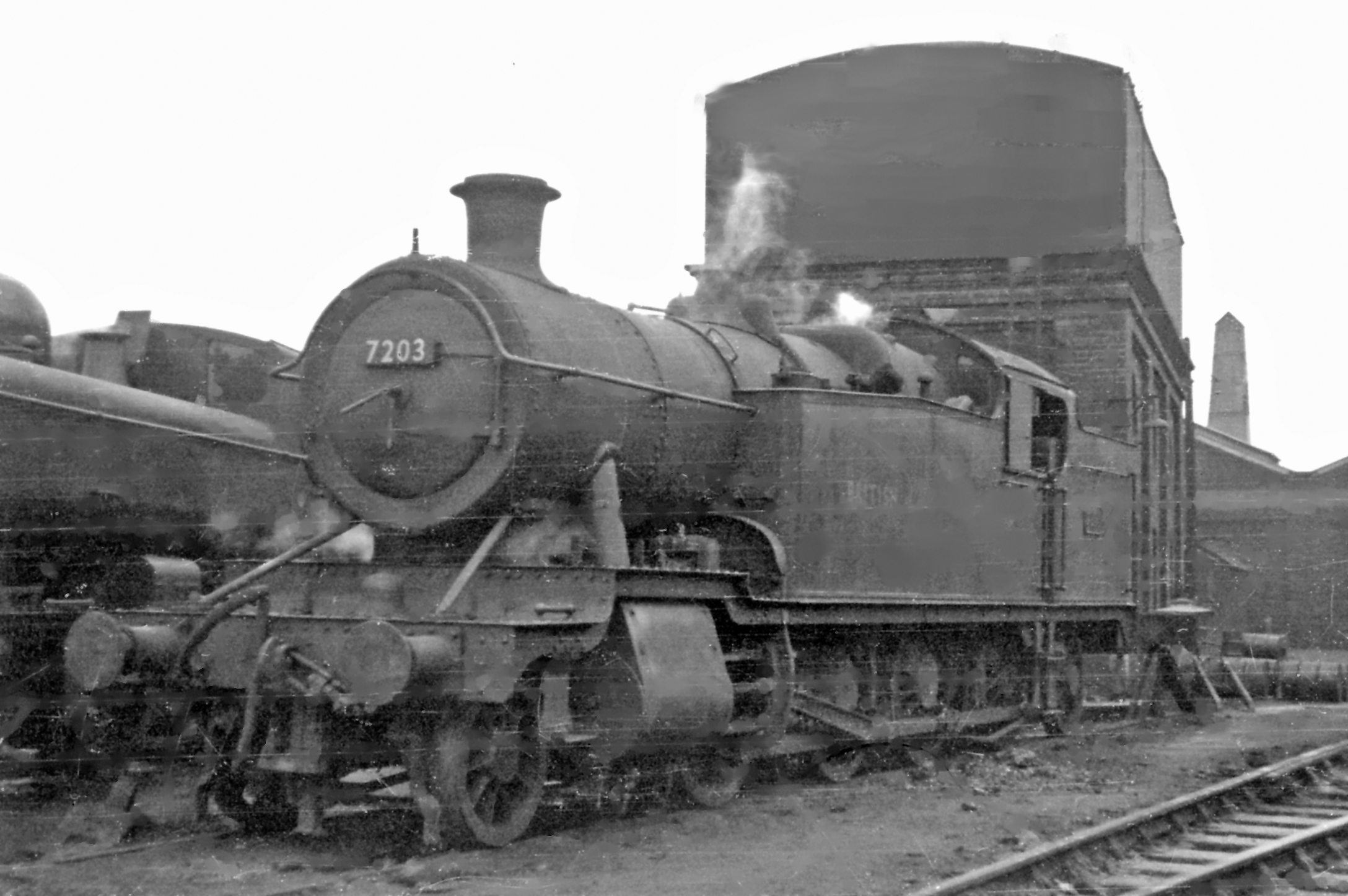
7203, converted from 2-8-0T 5278

== See also ==
- List of GWR standard classes with two outside cylinders
