= GWR 5205 Class =

Class of 2-8-0T steam locomotives

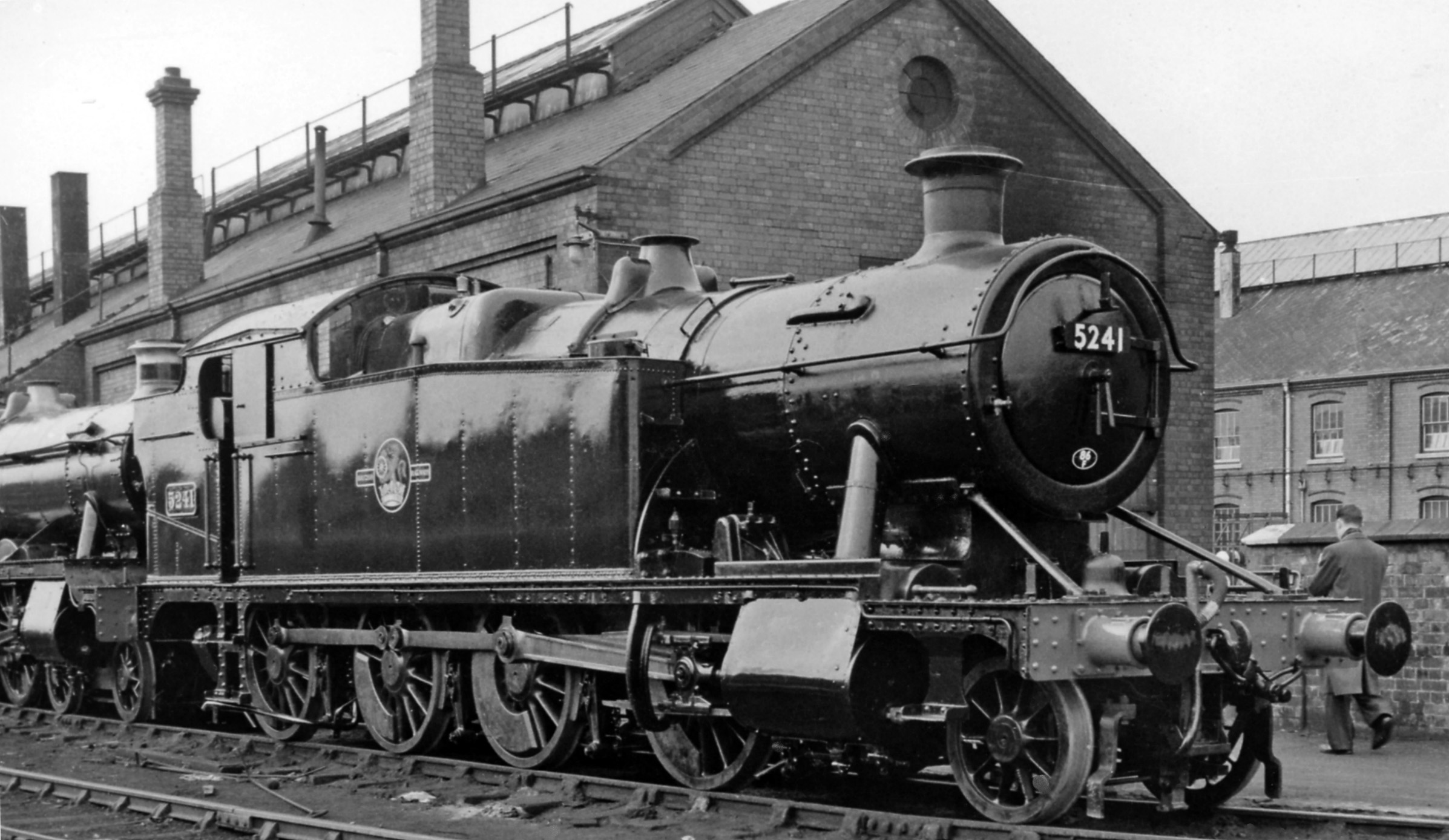
- 5241 at Swindon Works in 1962
Type and origin
- Power type: Steam
- Designer: Charles Collett
- Builder: GWR Swindon Works
- Order number: Lots 223, 225, 233, 266, 329
- Build date: 1923–1940
- Total produced: 100
Specifications
- Configuration
  - Whyte: 2-8-0T
- Gauge: 4 ft 8 1/2 in (1,435 mm) standard gauge
- Driver dia.: 4 ft 7 1/2 in (1,410 mm)
- Loco weight: 82 long tons 2 cwt (83 t; 92 short tons)
- Fuel type: Coal
- Fuel capacity: 4 long tons (4.1 t; 4.5 short tons)
- Water cap.: 1,800 imp gal (8,200 L; 2,200 US gal)
- Boiler pressure: 200 psi (1,400 kPa)
- Cylinders: two outside
- Cylinder size: 19 in × 30 in (483 mm × 762 mm)
Performance figures
- Tractive effort: 33,170 lbf (147.5 kN)
Career
- Operators: Great Western Railway, British Railways
- Power class: GWR: E BR: 8F
- Numbers: 5205–94, 5255–64 (numbers used twice)
- Axle load class: GWR: Red
- Withdrawn: 5275–94: 1934; 5255–64 (1st), 5265–74: 1935–36; 5205–54, 5255–64 (2nd): 1961–1965
- Disposition: 40 rebuilt as 7200 Class; 3 preserved; remainder scrapped

The Great Western Railway (GWR) 5205 Class is a class of 2-8-0T steam locomotives.

== History ==
=== 5205 Class ===
They were designed for short-haul coal trips from coal mines to ports in South Wales. They were based on the 4200 Class which had been introduced by the Great Western Railway in 1910. The 5205 series were of the same general design and 70 of the 5205 class were built, 5205-5274. They retained the straight frames of the 4200s, but had outside steam pipes and 19 in (480 mm) diameter cylinders so were slightly more powerful than their predecessors. In later years, many would be rebuilt to incorporate the 5275 raised footplate.

Twenty 5205s, 5255-5274 were converted to the 7200 Class in 1934/6.

=== 5275 Class ===
Twenty more locomotives to the same general design were built from 1930. This series had curved frames at the front with a raised section of frame over cylinders which were of the same size as the 5205 series. These were 5275 to 5294. These were all rebuilt as 7200 Class in 1934 without seeing significant use as a consequence of the stock market crash of 1929, with Welsh coal traffic decreasing immensely shortly before the 5275’s were built. Ten more, 5255-5264 were built in 1940 due to coal traffic rising as World War II picked up, these reusing numbers from 5205 class members which had also been rebuilt into the 7200 Class.

Table of orders and numbers
Year	Quantity	Lot No.	Locomotive numbers	Notes
1923	10	223	5205–5214	
1924	30	225	5215–5244	
1925–26	30	233	5245–5274	5255–5274 rebuilt as 7200 class 2-8-2T locomotives
1930	20	266	5275–5294	all rebuilt as 7200 class 2-8-2T locomotives
1940	10	329	5255–5264	Reuse numbers from the rebuilt 5205s of 1925/6

== Use ==
The 5205s and 5275s were largely used in South Wales alongside 4200 class engines, working the profitable coal traffic. They also saw use on Iron Ore trains and general freight traffic. A few found their way onto the Midland region and performed banking duties on the Lickey Incline.

== Preservation ==
Three examples of the 5205 class have been preserved with two of them 5224 and 5239 having run in preservation. No members of the 5275 class have been preserved in their original form, but two survive in rebuilt form in the 7200 class.

Number	Year Built	Withdrawn	Location	Status	Photograph	Notes
5224	1924	1963	Peak Rail	In store		Left Woodham Brothers, Barry Island in October 1978. Now owned by Pete Waterman, stored at Peak Rail. Has a 5275 style front end, curved foot plate and a raised section over the cylinders. Returned in 2000 and withdrawn in 2011, she is now in store awaiting overhaul to working condition.
5227	1924	1962	Didcot Railway Centre.	Scrapyard condition		One of the "Barry Ten". Retains straight frames. Axleboxes being used as part of the 4709 project. The Standard No. 4 Boiler, pony truck wheel set, 2 pony truck axleboxes, 4 horn guides and 2 eccentric sheaves are being transferred to the new build Churchward County 3840 "County of Montgomery." The remainder of the locomotive has been sold to an individual who intends to restore the locomotive to working order, which includes manufacturing the parts that were removed for the new build project. It is hoped the engine will remain at Didcot.
5239 Goliath	1924	1963	Dartmouth Steam Railway	Operational		Left Barry Island in June 1973. 5275 has front end, curved foot plate and a raised section over the cylinders. Overhauled at the East Somerset Railway from 2017 - 2019 for the Dartmouth Steam Railway. Returned to Dartmouth in March 2020.

== Models ==
In 2012, Hornby released models of the 5205 class in both BR black and GWR green.

== See also ==
- List of GWR standard classes with two outside cylinders
