= GWR 455 Class =

Class of British steam locomotives

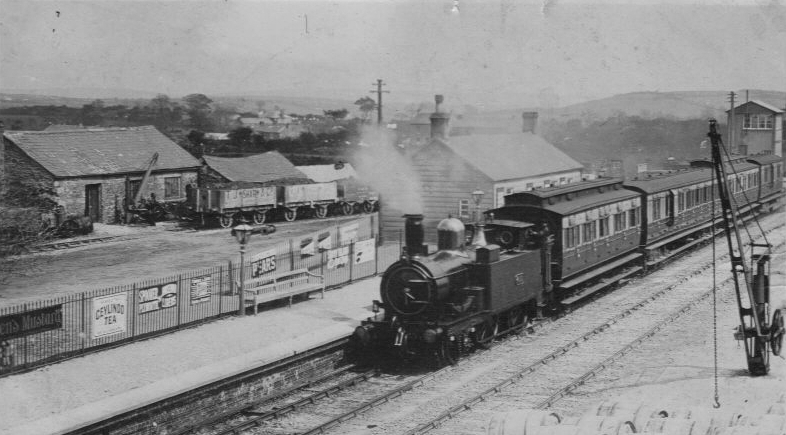
- GWR 455 Class at Bugle in Cornwall, around 1910
Type and origin
- Power type: Steam
- Designer: Joseph Armstrong
- Builder: GWR Swindon works
- Build date: 1869–1899
- Total produced: 140
Specifications
- Configuration
  - Whyte: 2-4-0T
- Gauge: 4 ft 8 1/2 in (1,435 mm) standard gauge
- Driver dia.: 5 ft 0 in (1.524 m)
- Fuel type: Coal
- Boiler: GWR Metro
- Cylinders: two
- Cylinder size: 16 in × 24 in (406 mm × 610 mm)
Career
- Operators: Great Western Railway; British Railways
- Nicknames: Metropolitan Tanks
- Withdrawn: 1898–1949
- Disposition: All scrapped

The GWR 455 Class, also called the "Metropolitan" or "Metro" Tanks, was a series of 140 2-4-0T locomotives built for the Great Western Railway, originally for their London suburban services, including running on the underground section of the Metropolitan Railway, the source of their nickname. Later on the class was seen on many other parts of the GWR system. Sixty "Metro" Tanks were built, from 1868 onwards, during the lifetime of their designer, Joseph Armstrong. His successor William Dean regarded the class so highly that he would add a further 80, the final 20 examples appearing as late as 1899. The "Metros" were all built at Swindon Works, in nine lots of ten or 20 engines each.

== Numbering ==
Table of orders and Numbers
Year	Quantity	Lot No.	Works Nos.	Locomotive numbers	Notes
1869	20	18	155–174	455–470, 1096–1099	1096–1090 renumbered 3–6 in 1870
1871	20	25	301–320	613–632	
1874	20	38	543–562	967–986	
1878	20	47	734–753	1401–1420	
1881–82	20	57	886–905	1445–1464	
1892	10	91	1351–1360	1491–1500	
1894	10	96	1421–1430	3561–3570	
1899	10	117	1733–1742	3581–3590	
1899	10	119	1763–1772	3591–3600	No. 3593 was rebuilt as a 2-4-2T in 1905; No. 3600 renumbered 3500 in December 1912. Withdrawn and scrapped in 1927.

== Variations ==
The first two batches had inside frames on all axles, but subsequently the leading wheels had outside axleboxes. The original 20 engines had a shorter coupled wheelbase than all the others, 8 ft 0 in (2.438 m) rather than 8 ft 3 in (2.515 m). Nos. 455–470 were partially rebuilt with longer wheelbases when first reboilered, in the 1880s, though not between the coupled wheels. Many of the earlier engines were rebuilt with larger tanks when reboilered, while the locomotives built in 1899 had still larger side tanks and coal bunkers when new; Nos. 1401–1410 were likewise rebuilt with larger tanks about the same time. Because of all these variations, the class is said to have existed in Small, Medium and Larger varieties. They all had 5 ft 0 in (1.524 m) diameter driving wheels – later sometimes enlarged by the use of thicker tyres to 5 ft 2 in (1.575 m) and 16 in × 24 in (406 mm × 610 mm) cylinders.

The earlier locomotives also differed from each other as to the boilers fitted. None of the originals had cabs – Armstrong always considered that these had a bad effect on the crew's attentiveness – but both half and full cabs were added later, and were provided from new on the later batches. A proportion of the class was intended to be fitted with condensing apparatus, for service on the Metropolitan: Nos. 613–622, 967–976, 1401–1410, and the engines of the last three batches. However, photographs show that some engines in the series did not in fact carry the apparatus. In their later years, from 1905, some of the class was fitted with autotrain apparatus for push-pull working.

=== Experimental conversion ===
In 1905 number 3593 was converted to a 2-4-2T with the addition of a rear bogie to support an extended bunker. This gave the appearance of a Metro tank from the cab forwards, and of a 3600 Tank further back. The conversion was clearly not sufficiently successful for more to be carried out and 3593 remained the only locomotive so treated. It worked on branch lines until it was withdrawn in 1927.

== Use ==
Up to the electrification of the Metropolitan and the District in 1905–07, the Metros operated on various underground routes. The original GWR services (1863) on the Metropolitan were broad gauge, but from 1869 standard gauge trains ran through to Moorgate Street; these were extended to Bishopsgate (Liverpool St) in 1875 and Aldgate in 1894. The GWR also provided about half the trains on the Hammersmith & City, and much of the Metropolitan's Aldgate-Paddington-Richmond service. The other principal service was the so-called Middle Circle, which differed from the later Circle Line in being routed via Addison Road (Olympia) and the West London Line. After the electrification of these services, the GWR continued to provide services from Notting Hill to Gunnersbury (until 1910) and from Old Oak Common to Victoria (until 1915); these were not in tunnel so did not require condensing locomotives. Naturally, the "Metro" tanks lost their condensing apparatus in their later years.

For the "underground" services the GWR maintained a fleet of about 50 "Metro" Tanks. Later the class continued to work on outer suburban services from Paddington, where O. S. Nock recalled many lively and precise runs with the class as late as c.1930. They were finally ousted by the 6100 Class after the rebuilding of Bishop's Road station at Paddington in 1933. Other than this, the class found much use around the GWR's Southern Division. Typical centres were Swindon, Oxford and Gloucester, while others were also seen in South Wales and in the West of England. They even hauled main-line trains on cross-country routes such as Gloucester-Cardiff, being capable of remarkably fast running when needed. After the end of their "underground" work some also appeared in the Northern Division, at Wellington and elsewhere.

== Withdrawal ==
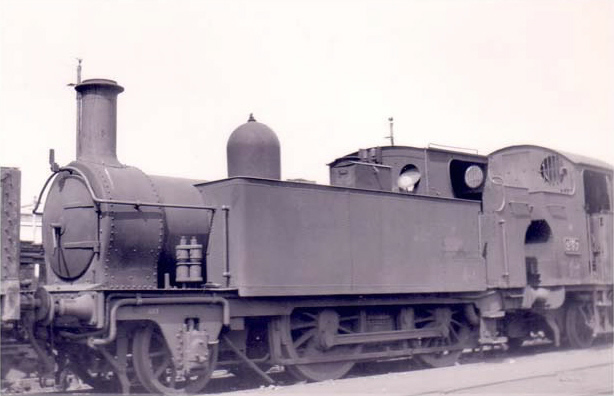
3588 at Swindon in 1950, after withdrawal

Withdrawal of the earlier locomotives began around 1900, though many others proved long-lived and worked on into the 1930s. Ten of the William Dean 3561-3599 series survived in British Railways ownership in 1948, though the last of them, No. 3599, was withdrawn in December 1949.
