= GWR 2600 Class =

Class of British steam locomotives (1900–1949)

GWR 2600 'Aberdare' Class
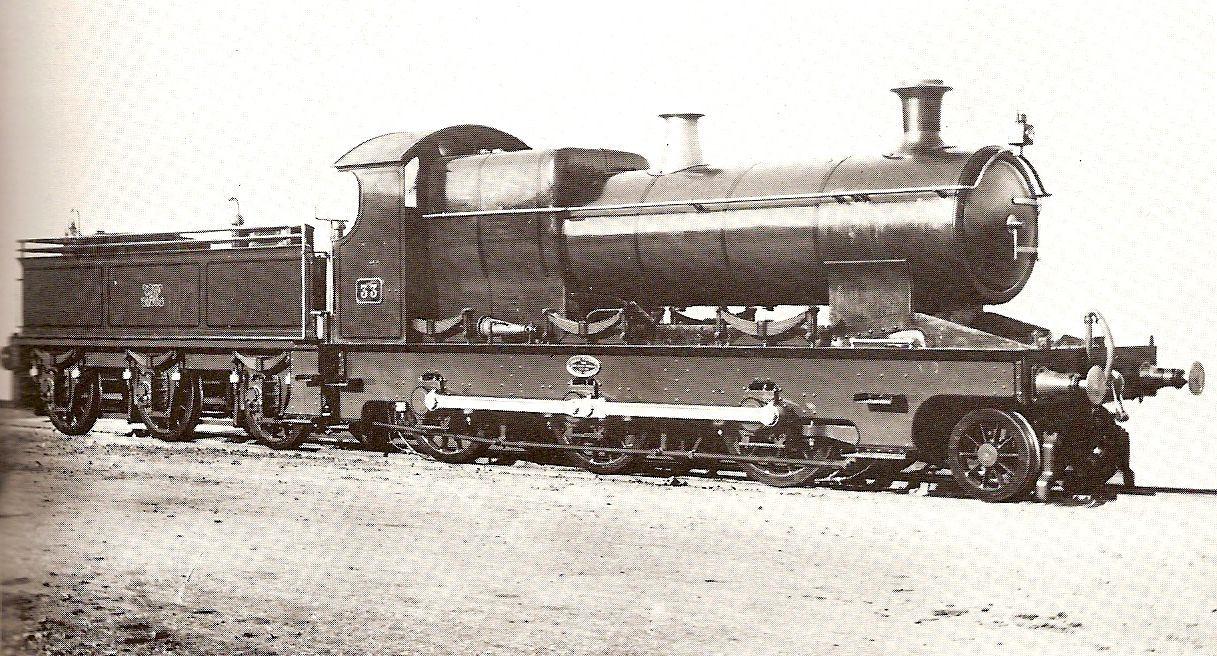
- No. 33 in 1900
Type and origin
- Power type: Steam
- Designer: William Dean
- Builder: GWR Swindon Works
- Order number: Lots 123, 128, 131, 133, 135, 156, 166
- Build date: 1900–1907
- Total produced: 81
Specifications
- Configuration
  - Whyte: 2-6-0
  - UIC: 1′C n2
- Gauge: 4 ft 8 1/2 in (1,435 mm) standard gauge
- Leading dia.: 2 ft 8 in (0.813 m)
- Driver dia.: 4 ft 7 1/2 in (1.410 m)
- Firebox
  - Grate area: 20.4 sq ft (1.90 m^{2})
- Boiler: GWR Standard No. 2; Standard No. 4
- Boiler pressure: 200 psi (1.38 MPa)
- Cylinders: Two, inside
- Cylinder size: 18 in × 26 in (457 mm × 660 mm)
Performance figures
- Tractive effort: 25,800 lbf (114.76 kN)
Career
- Operators: Great Western Railway, British Railways
- Numbers: 2600–2679
- Withdrawn: 1934–1949
- Disposition: All scrapped

The Great Western Railway (GWR) 2600 or Aberdare class was a class of 2-6-0 steam locomotive built between 1900 and 1907. They were a freight and light mineral development of the 3300 Bulldog and 4100 Badminton classes, both 4-4-0 locomotives. Therefore, the design was adapted and became a 2-6-0 type; the resulting locomotives were used for hauling coal trains between Aberdare and Swindon.

== Numbering ==
The class began in 1900 with a prototype, No. 33, renumbered 2600 in 1912. The rest were numbered 2601–2680 and were built between 1901 and 1907.

Table of orders and numbers
Year	Quantity	Lots No.	Serial Nos.	Locomotive Nos.	Notes
1900	1	128	1886	33	renumbered 2600 in 1912
1901	20	131	1908–1927	2621–2640	
1901–02	20	133	1929–1948	2641–2680	
1902	20	135	1949–1968	2661–2680	
1903	10	123	1796–1805	2611–2620	Lot and serial numbers out of sequence
1906	1	156	2125	2601	
1906	9	166	—	2602–2610	Renewal of 2602 Kruger class locomotives

== British Railways ==
British Railways (BR) inherited nos. 2612/20/3/43/51/5/6/62/5/7/9/80 in 1948. By 31 August 1948, only four were left: nos. 2620, 2651, 2655, 2667.

== Withdrawal ==
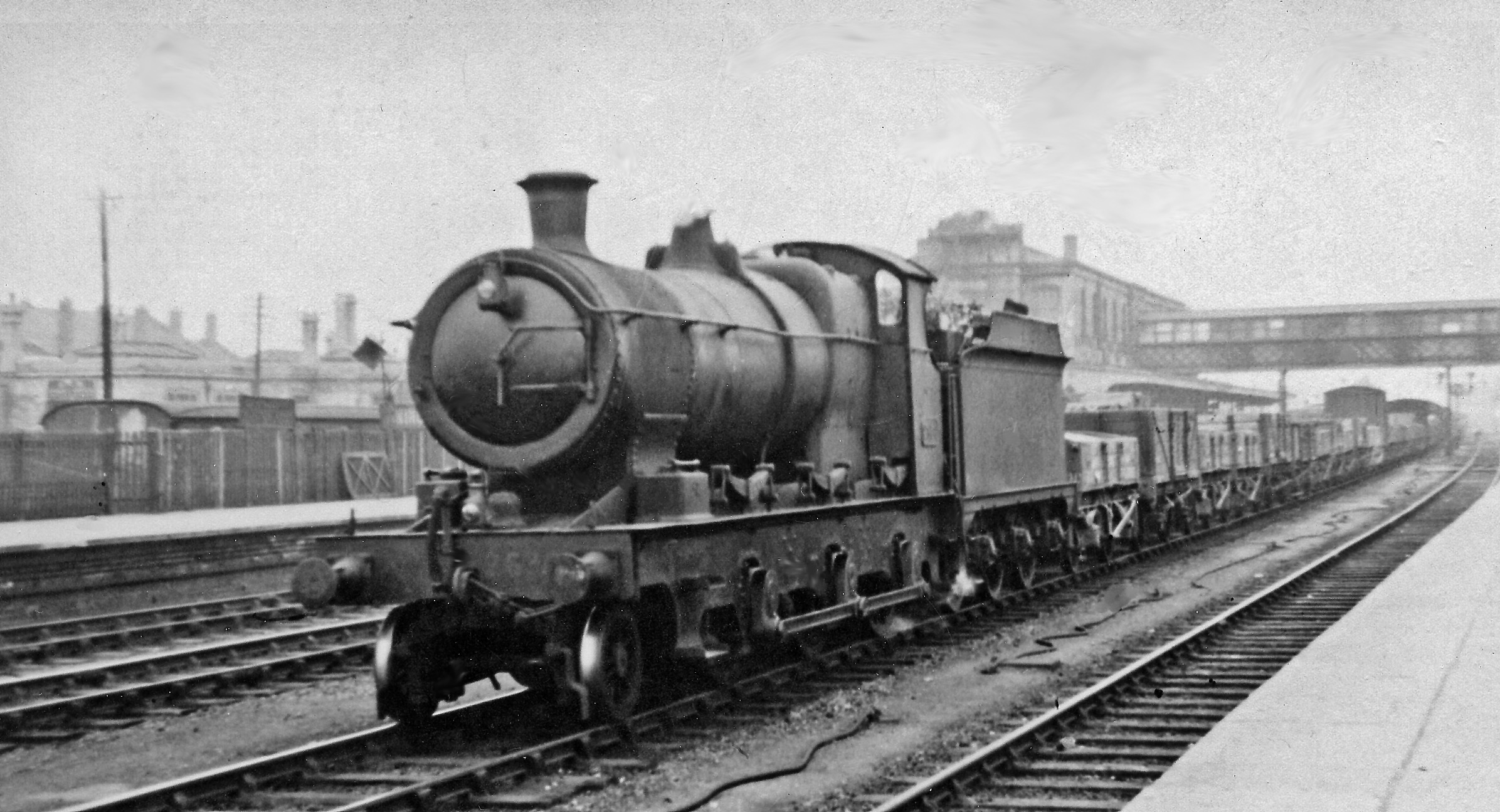
'Aberdare' No. 2636 passing Swindon 23 April 1946 a few months prior to withdrawal

They were withdrawn from 1934 onwards. Five Aberdares (2640, 2648, 2649, 2652 & 2657) withdrawn in early 1939 were not cut up but stored as Second World War reserves. These five reentered service by January 1940. Their withdrawal began again in 1944 until the last member, number 2667, was withdrawn in October 1949. No examples were preserved.
