= GWR 2800 Class =

British steam locomotive class (1903–1965)

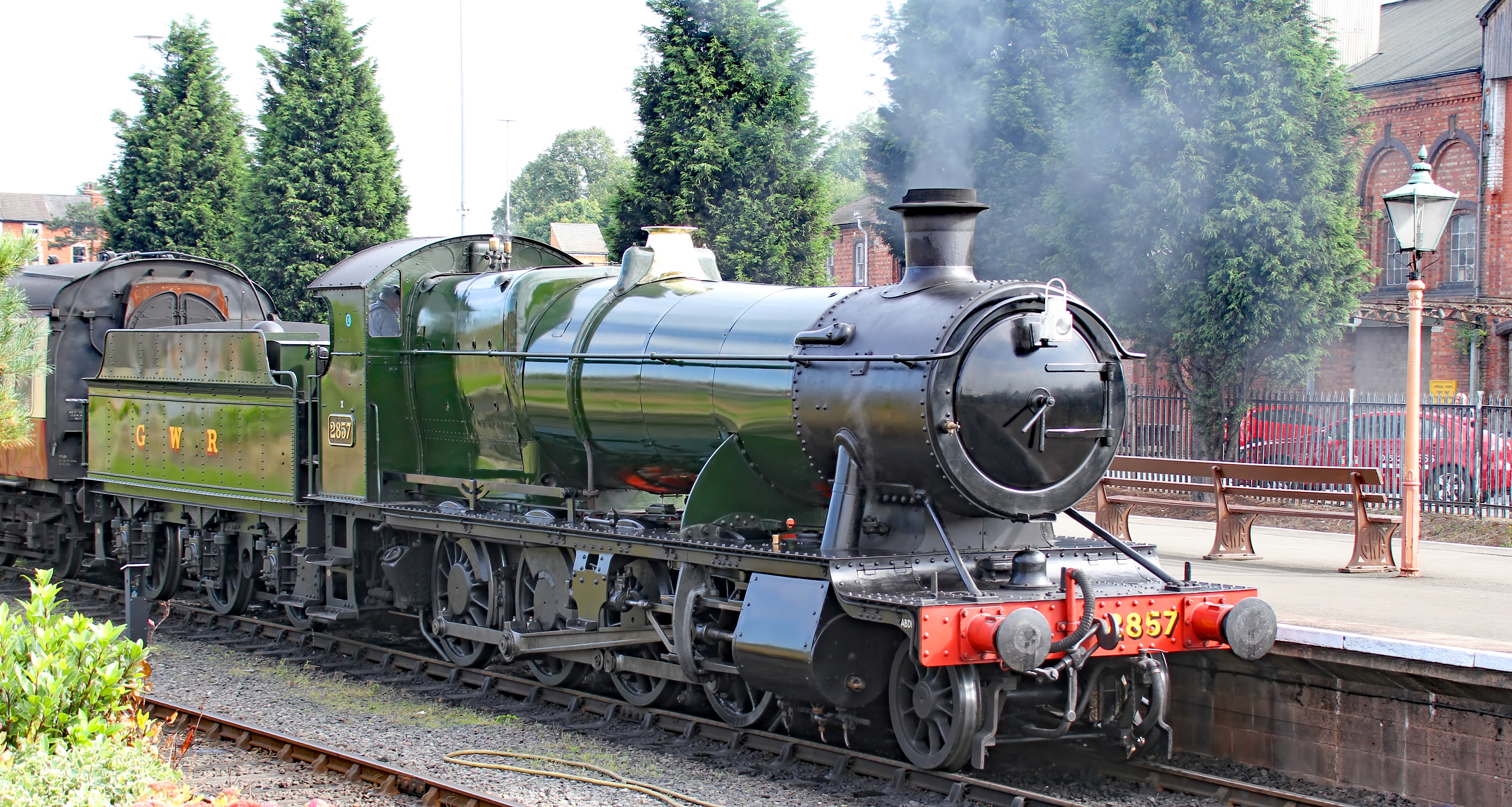
- GWR 2800 class 2857 in 2017
Type and origin
- Power type: Steam
- Designer: George Jackson Churchward
- Builder: GWR Swindon Works
- Order number: Lots 139, 153, 155, 160, 181, 186, 190, 210
- Build date: 1905–1919
- Total produced: 84
Specifications
- Configuration
  - Whyte: 2-8-0
- Gauge: 4 ft 8 1/2 in (1,435 mm) standard gauge
- Leading dia.: 3 ft 2 in (0.965 m)
- Driver dia.: 4 ft 7 1/2 in (1.410 m)
- Minimum curve: 7 chains (460 ft; 140 m) normal, 6 chains (400 ft; 120 m) slow
- Length: 63 ft 2 1/4 in (19.26 m)
- Width: 8 ft 11 in (2.718 m)
- Height: 12 ft 11 1/4 in (3.943 m)
- Axle load: 17 long tons 5 cwt (38,600 lb or 17.5 t) (17.5 t; 19.3 short tons) full
- Adhesive weight: 67 long tons 10 cwt (151,200 lb or 68.6 t) (68.6 t; 75.6 short tons) full
- Loco weight: 75 long tons 10 cwt (169,100 lb or 76.7 t) (76.7 t; 84.6 short tons) full
- Fuel type: Coal
- Water cap.: 3,500 imp gal (16,000 L; 4,200 US gal)
- Firebox
  - Grate area: 27.07 sq ft (2.515 m^{2})
- Boiler: GWR Standard No. 1
- Boiler pressure: 225 lbf/in^{2} (1.55 MPa)
- Heating surface
  - Firebox: 154.78 sq ft (14.380 m^{2})
  - Tubes: 1,686.60 sq ft (156.690 m^{2})
- Superheater
  - Type: 4-element or 6-element
  - Heating area: 4-element: 191.8 sq ft (17.82 m^{2}), 6-element: 253.38 sq ft (23.540 m^{2})
- Cylinders: Two, outside
- Cylinder size: 18 1/2 in × 30 in (470 mm × 762 mm)
Performance figures
- Tractive effort: 35,380 lbf (157.4 kN)
Career
- Operators: GWR » BR
- Power class: GWR: E BR: 8F
- Numbers: 2800–2883
- Axle load class: GWR: Blue
- Withdrawn: 1958–1965
- Disposition: Five preserved, Two parts donor, remainder scrapped

The Great Western Railway (GWR) 2800 Class is a class of steam locomotive designed in 1903 by George Jackson Churchward. Members of the class have a 2-8-0 wheel arrangement and were produced from 1905 to 1919 for heavy freight work, but members of the class were known to pull passenger trains when necessary. Six locomotives of this class have been preserved. The class was iterated upon by Charles Collett to create the 2884 class, constructed later in 1938.

== Production ==
The class was designed by George Jackson Churchward for heavy freight work. They were the first 2-8-0 locomotive class in Great Britain.

=== Prototype ===
The prototype, originally numbered 97 but later renumbered 2800, appeared in 1903. Construction of the production series commenced in 1905 and continued until 1919. No. 97 was originally outshopped in lined black livery and undertook two years of trials before the type went into production. Initial results suggested that only the front end needed further development and where the boiler of No. 97 was parallel for the first four segments, the production series had the familiar taper boiler. Initially the boiler pressure of the 2-8-0 was set at 200 lbf/in^{2} (1.4 MPa) with 18-inch (457 mm) diameter cylinders. Tractive effort started out at 29,775 lbf (132.45 kN) but was increased substantially in the production engines by enlarging the cylinder diameter to 18 1/2 in (470 mm) and raising the steam pressure to 225 lbf/in^{2} (1.55 MPa). The 8 1/2 in (216 mm) piston valves were enlarged to 10 in (254 mm).

=== Construction ===
The most visible difference between No. 97 (the prototype locomotive) and the first of the 1905 production batch was the higher pitch of the boiler (8 ft 2 in or 2.49 m opposed to 7 ft 8 1/2 in or 2.35 m). At first the prototype was given a 4,000-imperial-gallon (18,000 L; 4,800 US gal) tender but almost without exception the 2800s were harnessed to the 3,500-imperial-gallon (16,000 L; 4,200 US gal) variety throughout their working lives. Superheating was incorporated into the class from 1909 with No. 2808 the first to be retro-fitted. Other modifications centred on improving the weight distribution, altering smokebox lengths and fitting larger diameter chimneys.

The 84 2800s were the GWR's principal long haul freight engines throughout the 1920s and 1930s. The only serious problem met with in traffic was with the sealing of the internal steam pipes and beginning in 1934 most of the class had them replaced with outside pipes. This change, along with a side-window cab, were the only notable changes made for the later construction, when a further 83 locomotives were built in just 3 years from 1938, as the 2884 class.

Table of orders and numbers
Year	Quantity	Lot No.	Works No.	Locomotive numbers	Notes
1903	1	139	1991	97	Renumbered 2800 in 1912
1905	10	153	2096–2105	2801–2810	
1905	10	155	2115–2124	2811–2820	
1907	10	160	2158–2167	2821–2830	
1911	5	181	2390–2394	2831–2835	
1912	10	186	2436–2445	2836–2845	
1913	10	190	2486–2495	2846–2855	
1918–19	28	210	2762–2789	2856–2883	

== Operation ==
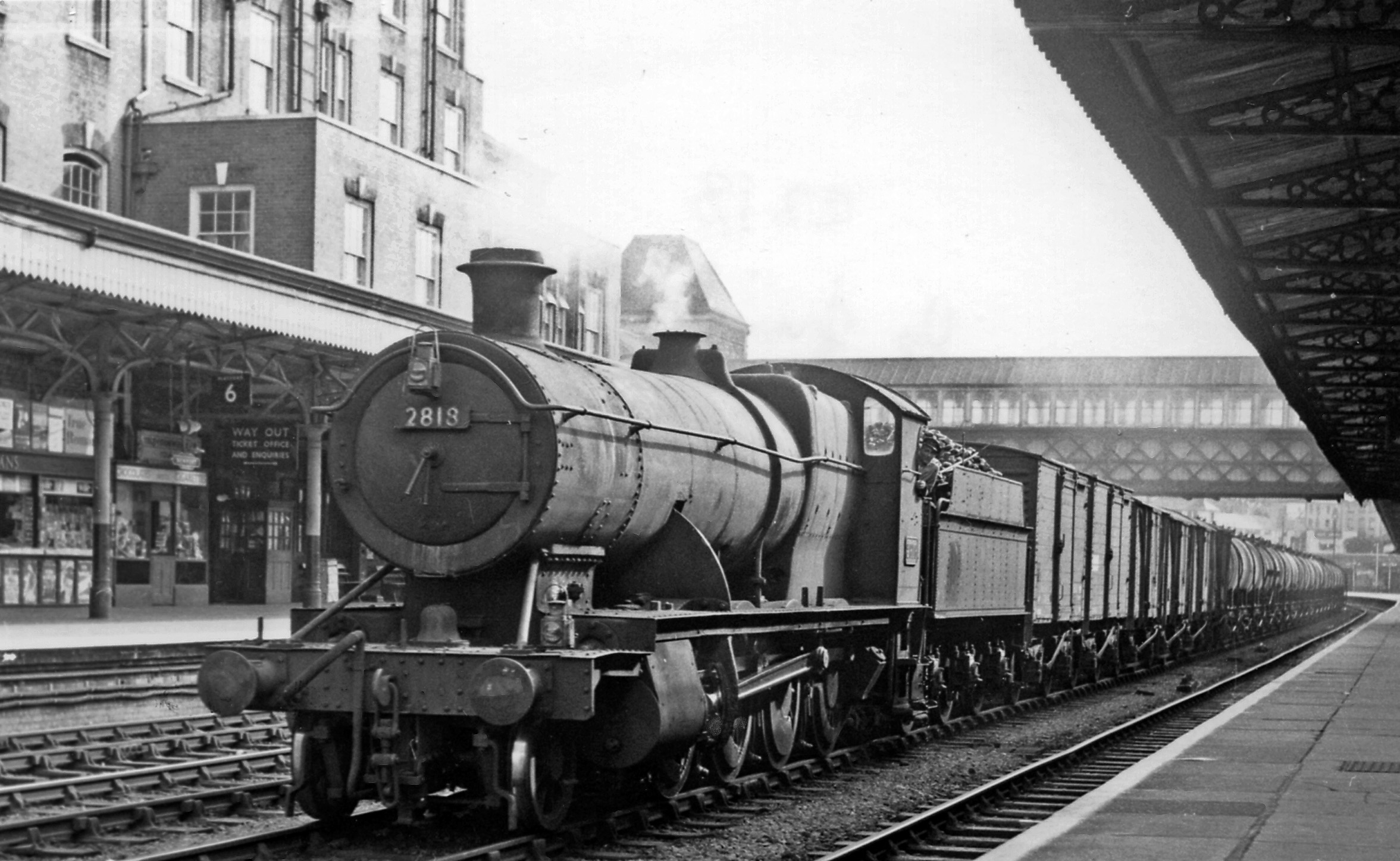
2818 at Newport High Street in 1963

The 2800 class was particularly used for hauling heavy trains of coal from the South Wales coalfields to the large conurbations served by the GWR, and large numbers of the class were allocated to sheds in South Wales. However, the class was the primary heavy freight locomotive on the GWR, and therefore saw use across the railway network. Due to the variety of freight flows, it was found that individual locomotives could spend extended periods away from their home shed, and a container was added to the left hand valence which carried details of boiler washout dates to ensure that this necessary activity was carried out in a timely manner. There was no differentiation in duties between the original 2800 class of 1905 and the modified 2884 design of the 1930s.

=== Oil firing ===
The 2800 class, as constructed, burnt coal as its means of creating and maintaining the fire necessary to heat the water in its boiler. Between 1945 and 1947, coal shortages caused GWR to experiment with oil fired locomotives, as such, 12 of the 2800 class were converted. They were renumbered to the 4800 series, which necessitated re-numbering the entire 4800 class autotanks into the 1400 series. The experiment, encouraged by the Government, was abandoned in 1948 once the extra maintenance costs, and the cost of burning oil instead of coal were realised.

== Accidents and incidents ==
- On 6 January 1932, locomotive No. 2808 was hauling a freight train when it collided with a milk train, being hauled by GWR 2900 Class 4-6-0 No. 2949 Stanford Court, at Didcot East Junction. The locomotive was extensively damaged along with seventeen wagons. Ten more wagons were destroyed. The milk train had overrun signals.
- On 15 January 1936, locomotive No. 2802 was hauling a freight train that became divided at Shrivenham, Oxfordshire. An express passenger train, hauled by GWR 6000 Class 4-6-0 No. 6007 King William III collided with the rear portion of the freight due to errors by the guard and signalman. Two people were killed.

== Withdrawal ==
Table of withdrawals
Year	Quantity in service at start of year	Total number withdrawn	Locomotive numbers
1958	84	6	2800/1-2/14/20/27.
1959	78	35	2803-4/8/10-12/15-17/23-26/28-30/32-33/38/40/43/48/63-64/68-70/78/80.
1960	49	49	2805-6/9/13/21/31/35/37/44/46-47/50/77/81.
1961	35	50	2819.
1962	34	56	2834/49/53/55/60/83.
1963	28	74	2807/18/41-42/45/51-52/54/57-58/61/65-67/71-72/74/82
1964	10	83	2822/36/39/56/59/62/73/75/79.
1965	1	84	2876.

== Preservation ==
Six 2800 Class locomotives survive, these being 2807, 2818, 2857, 2859, 2873, 2874, along with nine 2884 class locomotives. One additional survivor was used to provide parts for other projects. Only two members of the class have so far operated in preservation, these being 2807 and 2857. One of the class, No. 2857, briefly operated on the main line in 1985.

Number	Year built	Withdrawn	Location	Status	Inside Steam Pipes	Livery	Owner	Image	Notes
2807	Aug 1905	Mar 1963	Gloucestershire Warwickshire Railway	Operational, boiler ticket Expires: 2033	No	GWR Unlined Green, Shirtbutton Logo	Cotswold Steam Preservation Ltd		Salvaged from Woodham Brothers in 1981 it was restored to running order at the Gloucestershire Warwickshire Railway. It is the oldest survivor of its class in preservation.
2818	Dec 1905	Oct 1963	Museum of the Great Western Railway	Static display	Yes	GWR Unlined Green, Great Western Lettering	Museum of the Great Western Railway		Preserved straight from service. Previously part of the National Collection, ownership was transferred to Museum of the Great Western Railway, Swindon in 2017 and the locomotive moved there in 2018. Retains inside steam pipes and straight frames.
2857	May 1918	Apr 1963	Severn Valley Railway	Stored awaiting overhaul	No	GWR Unlined Green, GWR Lettering	The 2857 Society		See below.
2859	May 1918	Dec 1964	Private site, Congleton	Under restoration as of 2020	No	N/A	Private Owner		Moved to Congleton from the Llangollen Railway for restoration in November 2017 following its sale to a private owner.
2873	Nov 1918	Dec 1964	Dartmouth Steam Railway	Dismantled	Yes	N/A	Dartmouth Steam Railway		Spares donor for other Great Western locomotives based on the Dartmouth Steam Railway. At one point in time, the boiler from No. 2873 was intended to be used in a Star Class locomotive, but those plans never materialized.
2874	Nov 1918	May 1963	Gloucestershire Warwickshire Railway	Under restoration as of 2026	Yes	N/A	The 2874 Trust		Under restoration from scrapyard condition.

=== 2857 ===
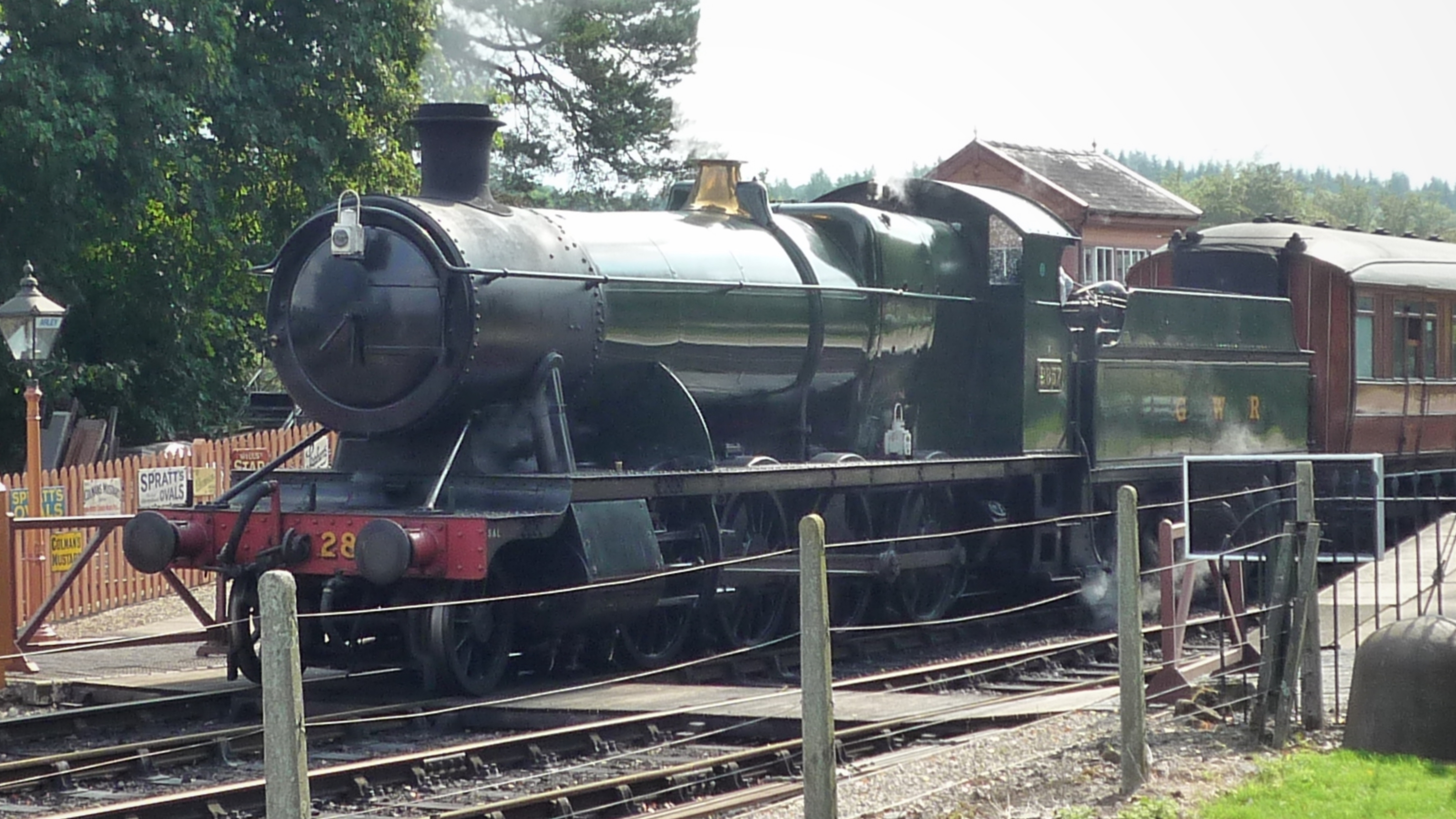
2857 working on the Severn Valley Railway.

Purchased from Woodham Brothers in May 1974 by the 2857 Society for £5,775, 2857 was later moved by rail to the Severn Valley Railway in August 1975 and steamed for the first time in September 1979 after overhaul. As of 2018, the engine is the second oldest of the class to run in preservation, becoming 100 years old in May 2018.

In 1985, during the 150th anniversary celebrations of the Great Western Railway, it took a selection of the Severn Valley Railway's goods wagons to Newport for a Railfreight spectacular event. The outward route took the engine via Worcester & Hereford with the return route being via Severn Tunnel Junction, Chepstow & Gloucester. The locomotive appeared in the 2020 film Enola Holmes.

=== 2861 ===
2861, built in 1918, was one of the "Barry Ten". It was broken up for parts at the Llangollen Railway in 2014, and the frames were scrapped. The cylinder and saddle block, along with several other components, are being used in the construction of a new GWR 4700 Class, No. 4709. 2861's boiler was also planned to be used to recreate a Star Class replica.

== Models ==
Hornby Railways manufacture a model of the 28xx in OO gauge. Dapol have announced their own OO model, including a website-exclusive model of the preserved 2874. Dapol will make financial contributions to the 2874 Trust based on the sales of the exclusive model.

== See also ==
- List of GWR standard classes with two outside cylinders
