= GWR 5700 Class =

Class of 0-6-0 pannier tank steam locomotives

Great Western Railway 5700 class
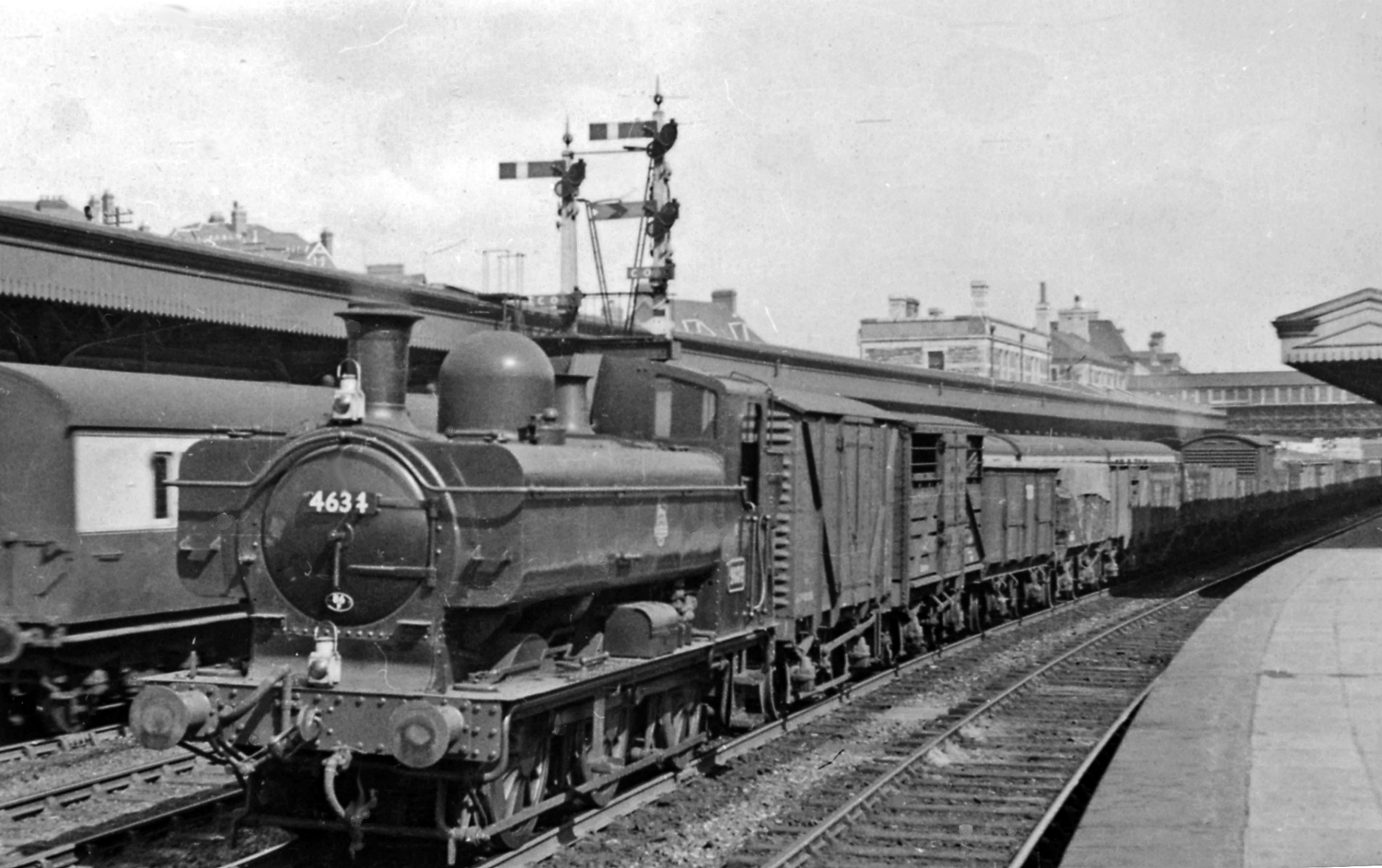
- 4634 at Newport High Street Station in 1954
Type and origin
- Power type: Steam
- Designer: Charles Collett
- Builder: GWR Swindon Works (613); Armstrong Whitworth (25); W. G. Bagnall (50); Beyer, Peacock & Co. (25); Kerr Stuart (25); North British Locomotive (100); Yorkshire Engine Co. (25)
- Order number: See Build details below
- Build date: 1929–1950
- Total produced: 863
Specifications
- Configuration
  - Whyte: 0-6-0PT
  - UIC: C n2t
- Gauge: 4 ft 8 1/2 in (1,435 mm) standard gauge
- Driver dia.: 4 ft 7 1/2 in (1.410 m)
- Minimum curve: 5 chains (330 ft; 101 m) normal; 4 1/2 chains (297 ft; 91 m) slow (Note: 6700-49 – 4 chains (264 ft; 80 m) (normal) and 3 1/2 chains (231 ft; 70 m) (slow).)
- Wheelbase: 15 ft 6 in (4.72 m)
- Length: 31 ft 2 in (9.50 m) over buffers
- Width: 8 ft 7 in (2.616 m)
- Height: 12 ft 3 1/16 in (3.735 m)
- Frame type: Type: Inside; Length: 27 ft 6 in (8.38 m); Width: 8 ft 7 in (2.616 m)
- Axle load: 16 long tons 15 cwt (37,500 lb or 17 t) (18.8 short tons) full (Note: 8750 class – 17 long tons 0 cwt (38,100 lb or 17.3 t) (19.0 short tons), 9700 class – 17 long tons 4 cwt (38,500 lb or 17.5 t) (19.3 short tons).)
- Loco weight: 47 long tons 10 cwt (106,400 lb or 48.3 t) (53.2 short tons) full (Note: 8750 class – 49 long tons 0 cwt (109,800 lb or 49.8 t) (54.9 short tons), and 9700 class – 50 long tons 15 cwt (113,700 lb or 51.6 t) (56.8 short tons).)
- Fuel type: Coal
- Fuel capacity: 3 long tons 6 cwt (7,400 lb or 3.4 t) (3.7 short tons) (Note: 9700 class – 2 long tons 16 cwt (6,300 lb or 2.8 t) (3.1 short tons).)
- Water cap.: 1,200 imp gal (5,500 L; 1,400 US gal) (Note: 9700 class – 1,230 imp gal (5,600 L; 1,480 US gal).)
- Firebox
  - Grate area: 15.3 sq ft (1.42 m^{2})
- Boiler
  - Model: GWR 2301
  - Pitch: 6 ft 11 3/4 in (2.127 m)
  - Diameter: Barrel: 10 ft 3 in (3.12 m); Outside diameter: 4 ft 5 in (1.35 m) & 4 ft 3 7/8 in (1.318 m)
- Boiler pressure: 200 lbf/in^{2} (1.38 MPa)
- Heating surface
  - Firebox: 102.3 sq ft (9.50 m^{2})
  - Tubes: 1,075.7 sq ft (99.94 m^{2})
  - Total surface: 1,178.0 sq ft (109.44 m^{2})
- Cylinders: Two, inside
- Cylinder size: 17.5 in × 24 in (444 mm × 610 mm)
- Valve gear: Stephenson
- Valve type: Slide valves
- Train heating: Steam (Note: 6700-79 were built for shunting only and were not fitted with ATC, vacuum braking, and steam heating.)
- Loco brake: Steam
- Train brakes: Vacuum
- Safety systems: ATC
Performance figures
- Tractive effort: 22,515 lbf (100.15 kN)
Career
- Operators: GWR » BR, NCB, London Transport, Stephenson Clarke Ltd.
- Power class: GWR: C; BR: 3F
- Numbers: See Numbering below
- Axle load class: GWR: Blue until 1950, then Yellow
- Withdrawn: 1956–1971
- Preserved: see #Preservation
- Disposition: 16 preserved, remainder scrapped

The GWR 5700 Class (or 57xx class) is a class of 0-6-0PT steam locomotive built by the Great Western Railway (GWR) and British Railways (BR) between 1929 and 1950. With 863 built, they were the most prolific class of the GWR, and one of the most numerous classes of British steam locomotive. (Note: Le Fleming mentions LNWR DX (943 built) and LMS Class 5 (842 built) among other numerous classes of British steam locomotives. However, he does not mention the WD Austerity 2-8-0 (935 built), possibly because all but three were transported to mainland Europe after D-Day for use by the British Army, and only 733 of the class later returned to mainline use in the UK.)

Although officially designated by GWR as "light goods and shunting engines", they were also used for passenger working on branch, suburban, and shorter mainline journeys. They were distributed across most of the GWR network and, after nationalisation of the railways in 1948, across the Western Region of British Railways, and also other regions. Although not as large as the GWR Castles and Kings, they became just as much of an icon of the GWR, due to their iconic design and quantity.

As a result of the 1955 Modernisation Plan, the 5700 Class was withdrawn from BR service between 1956 and 1966. Nineteen withdrawn locomotives were sold to the London Transport Executive and industry, of which ten were later preserved, along with six that were retrieved from scrapyards.

== Background ==
The GWR started designing and building 0-6-0 tank locomotives in 1860, and this continued into the BR era until 1956, with a total of 2,393 being built. The GWR also used 0-6-0 tank locomotives from other manufacturers' designs (from its subsidiary and absorbed railways' stock), and since 1898 it always had at least 1,000 tank locomotives in stock.

The early 0-6-0 tank engines were fitted with either saddle tanks (wrapped over the boiler) or side tanks (mounted at the side of the boiler and reaching down to the running platform). The Great Western first fitted pannier tanks (mounted on the side of the boiler but not reaching down to the running platform) in 1898 to a single 4-4-0T locomotive, No. 1490, and, in 1901, to two 0-6-4 crane tank locomotives. They started to be fitted to 0-6-0 tanks from 1903, but weren't being fitted more generally until about the end of 1909. The shape of the Belpaire firebox gives a larger surface area which improves heat transfer and steam production, but their rectangular shape made them difficult to combine with saddle tanks. Locomotives fitted with pannier tanks have a lower centre of gravity than those with saddle tanks (enabling higher speeds on curves), and access for maintenance is easier than for those fitted with side tanks.

George Jackson Churchward's period as Chief Mechanical Engineer from 1901 to 1921 is well known for significant improvements in locomotive design and manufacture, and the development of standard designs. However, the scope of the standard designs did not include the 0-6-0 tank locomotive, and the GWR did not introduce any new 0-6-0 tank designs from 1897 to 1928 (with exception of the 1361 Class of five 0-6-0 saddle tanks in 1910).

However, pannier tanks and Belpaire fireboxes became the standard for the rebuilding of various 0-6-0 tank locomotives (projected in 1902 and getting fully underway by 1910). The rebuilding program also included a number of other changes including:

- improved cab designs, eventually becoming fully enclosed
- superheating, which by 1929, had been found to have little benefit on shunting engines
- adaptation for working with autocoaches for push–pull trains (auto-working)
- increasing boiler pressures, for example, the various rebuilds of the GWR 2721 class started at 150 lbf/in^{2} (1.03 MPa), increasing to 165 lbf/in^{2} (1.14 MPa), and then to 180 lbf/in^{2} (1.24 MPa)

With the completion of grouping in 1923, GWR's collection of 0-6-0 tank locomotives was expanded with the stock from 28 acquired companies. The acquired tank locomotives came from different manufacturers, were a mixture of side, saddle and pannier, and varied widely by size and state of repair. In addition, GWR's stock was wearing out, and the variety of classes was problematic for maintenance and rostering. Collett had to produce a new standard design for 0-6-0 pannier tanks, which resulted in the 5700 Class.

== Design ==
The first batch of 300 locomotives built between 1929 and 1931 included a medium height chimney, a mid-boiler dome, safety valve with cover, and an enclosed cab. They were similar in appearance and design to older 0-6-0 tank engines that had been rebuilt as pannier tanks, particularly the later rebuilds of the 1854 Class (based on the earlier 645 Class), retaining the latter's 'four down, two up' layout of springing, longer smokebox and forward-mounted chimney (necessitated by the re-positioning of the regulator within the smokebox). The 17 1/2 in (440 mm) cylinders and 4 ft 7 1/2 in (1.410 m) driving wheels of the later 2721 Class were adopted and the front overhang was extended from 4 ft 9 in (1.45 m) to 5 ft 6 in (1.68 m). The frames were strengthened and altered in configuration to 'marry up' with the longer smokebox (unlike the '1854' rebuilds), and the injectors, valances, and wheel centres redesigned (this being a 14-spoke offset crankpin arrangement instead of the earlier 16-spoke in-line one).

=== Specification ===
The table below gives the technical specifications of the 5700 class. Values are from GWR diagram B48 unless referenced otherwise.

5700s technical specifications
Dimensions	Length over buffers: 31 ft 2 in (9.50 m); Width: 8 ft 7 in (2.62 m); Height: 12 ft 3 1/16 in (3.74 m)
Firegrate area	15.3 sq ft (1.42 m^{2})
Firebox	Outside: 5 ft 4 in (1.63 m) x 4 ft 7 3/8 in (1.41 m) and 4 ft 0 in (1.22 m); Inside: 4 ft 7 3/16 in (1.40 m) x 3 ft 8 in (1.12 m) and 3 ft 3 3/4 in (1.01 m); Height: 6 ft 0 1/2 in (1.84 m)
Tubes	2 off diameter 5 1/8 in (0.13 m); 233 off diameter 1 5/8 in (0.04 m); Length: 10 ft 6 13/16 in (3.22 m)
Heating surface	Tubes: 1,075.7 sq ft (99.94 m^{2}); Firebox: 102.3 sq ft (9.50 m^{2}); Total: 1,178.0 sq ft (109.44 m^{2})
Boiler	Barrel: 10 ft 3 in (3.12 m); Outside diameter: 4 ft 5 in (1.35 m) & 4 ft 3 7/8 in (1.318 m); Pitch: 6 ft 11 3/4 in (2.127 m)
Working pressure	200 lbf/in^{2} (1.38 MPa)
Cylinders	Two; Inside; Diameter: 17 1/2 in (0.44 m); Stroke: 24 in (0.61 m)
Valve gear	Stephenson (slide)
Wheels	4 ft 7 1/2 in (1.410 m) diameter, coupled
Wheelbase	15 ft 6 in (7 ft 3 in + 8 ft 3 in) (4.72 m (2.21 m + 2.51 m))
Tractive effort (85%)	22,515 lbf (100.15 kN)
Coal capacity	3 long tons 6 cwt (7,400 lb or 3.4 t)
Water capacity	1,200 imp gal (5,500 L; 1,400 US gal)
Weight (full)	First axle: 16 long tons 15 cwt (37,500 lb or 17 t); Second axle: 16 long tons 15 cwt (37,500 lb or 17 t); Third axle: 14 long tons 0 cwt (31,400 lb or 14.2 t); Total: 47 long tons 10 cwt (106,400 lb or 48.3 t)
Minimum curve	Normal: 5 chains (330 ft; 100 m); Slow: 4 1/2 chains (300 ft; 91 m)

The 5700s were given the GWR route colour Blue (Note: In 1950, the route classification was changed to Yellow because of the 5700s' low hammer blow.) (based on axle load), and were in the GWR power group C (based on tractive effort). The classifications were shown on the cab with the letter C in a blue disc.

le Fleming describes the 5700 class as "an almost unaltered continuation of the 27xx rebuilds" and Holcroft describes them as "practically identical to 2721 rebuilds", but according to Oswald Nock it was "a thoroughly modern design", and Jones notes that design included "numerous detailed improvements" and reflected improved construction techniques. The main differences from the 2721 class include:

- increased boiler pressure, from 180 lbf/in^{2} (1.24 MPa) to 200 lbf/in^{2} (1.38 MPa), giving a corresponding increase in tractive effort
- improved valve settings
- longer frame, from 26 ft 9 in (8.15 m) to 27 ft 6 in (8.38 m)
- fully enclosed cab

The initial design also included a return to non-fluted coupling rods and laminated springs beneath the leading and driving axleboxes (both features harking back to the 1854 class). The locomotives were also fitted with cast iron chimneys (which had only rarely been fitted to earlier locomotives), and the whistles were fitted on top of the firebox rather than on top of the cab.

=== 6700 Sub-class ===
Of the first batch of 300 locomotives, most were fitted with vacuum brakes and steam heating, and some of these were also fitted with GWR's Automatic Train Control (ATC) safety system. (Note: Apart from the locomotives built specifically for shunting, the fitting of vacuum brakes, steam heating, and ATC became standard for the class, and was added to earlier locomotives within a few years of building. For locomotives build by outside contractors, the ATC equipment was added on arrival at Swindon.)

However, the 50 locomotives of the 6700 or 67xx Class were not fitted with vacuum brakes, steam heating, or ATC, and were fitted with three link couplings only; they were therefore limited to shunting duties and some freight working. The 6700s had a smaller minimum railway curve radius of 4 chains (260 ft; 80 m) (normal) and 3 1/2 chains (230 ft; 70 m) (slow) and an increased axle clearance.

=== 8750 Sub-class ===
The 8750 or 87xx Class were first built in 1933, using an updated design which included an improved cab with a higher roof, rectangular windows and grills (as opposed to the round windows (or "spectacles") of the initial design), and sliding shutters and hinged doors for more protection from the elements. The new style cab was derived from the sister 5400 Class, the first of which were built in 1931. Vacuum brakes, steam heating, and ATC were fitted as standard (except for Nos. 6750–79, built between 1946 and 1950, which were fitted with steam brakes and three link couplings only). The locomotive weight increased to 49 long tons 0 cwt (109,800 lb or 49.8 t), and the axle load increased to 17 long tons 0 cwt (38,100 lb or 17.3 t).

=== 9700 Class ===
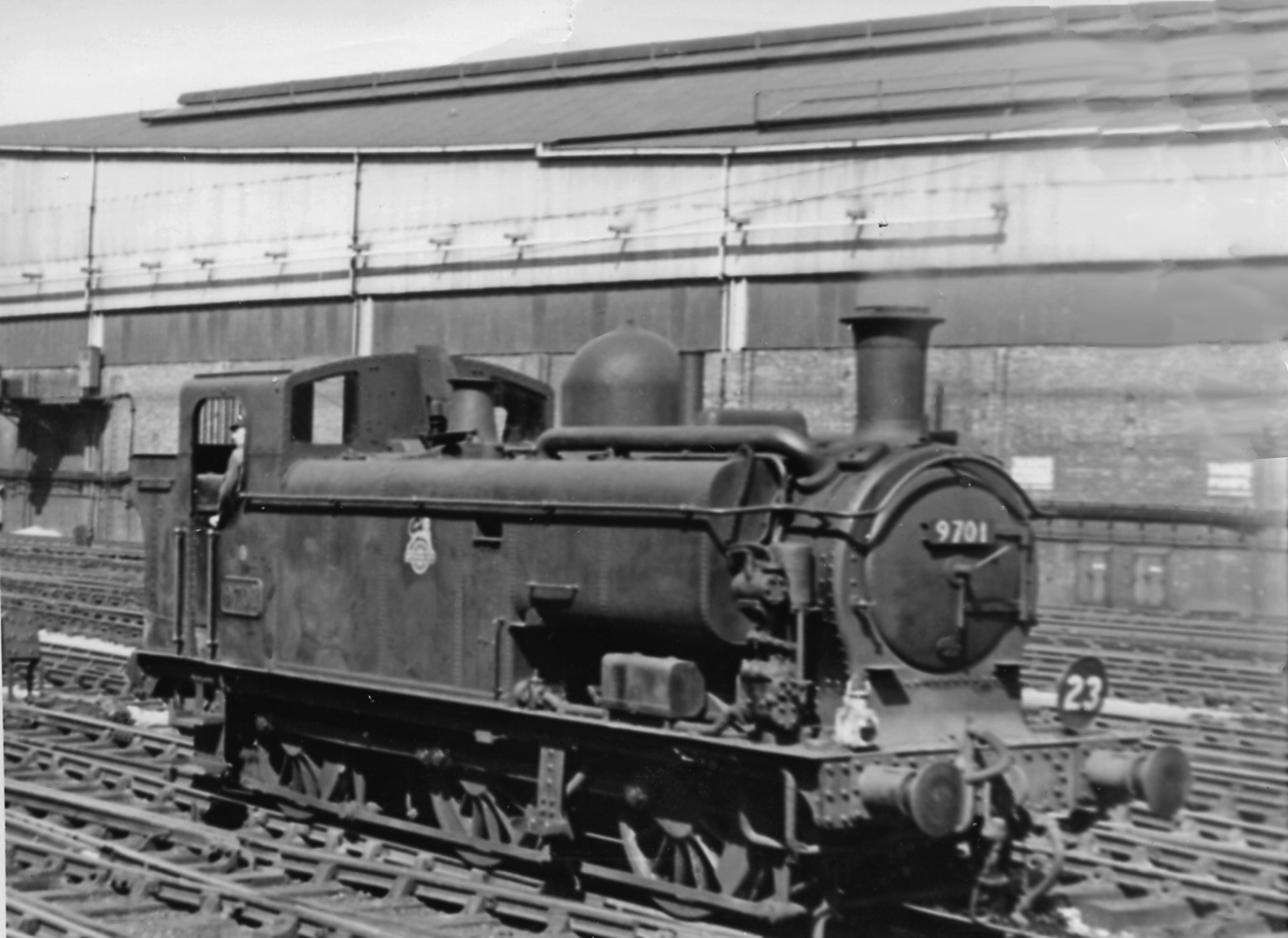
No. 9701 at Paddington, showing the modified tanks and condensing apparatus

The 9700 or 97xx Class pannier tanks were a direct development of the 5700 class. The prototype for the class, No. 8700 (later No. 9700), was a rebuilt 5700 locomotive. They were specifically for working on the Hammersmith & City line between Paddington station and Smithfield Meat Market. They replaced Metro and 633 class locomotives.

The eleven locomotives in the class had a condensing apparatus that fed the exhaust steam back into the water tanks. The tanks themselves were shortened to make room for the external exhaust pipes and were extended down to the footplate in front of the cab to increase their capacity. As condensing the steam heated the water, a reciprocating pump (Weir pump) was fitted as a boiler feedwater pump because standard injectors will not work with hot water. The pumps led to (unsuccessful) tests with these locomotives acting as fire engines during World War II.

To work over the electrified underground lines, the 9700 Class locomotives had a special type of ATC equipment that lifted clear of the centre rail and had tripcock brake valves that matched the London Transport signalling system. The design changes resulted in reduced coal (2 long tons 16 cwt (6,300 lb or 2.8 t)) capacity and a slight increase (1,230 imp gal (5,600 L; 1,480 US gal)) in water capacity. The locomotive weight increased to 50 long tons 15 cwt (113,700 lb or 51.6 t), and the axle load increased to 17 long tons 4 cwt (38,500 lb or 17.5 t).

=== Later developments ===
From 1936 to 1942, a number of small changes were introduced to new builds:

- In 1936, a whistle shield was added to the front of the cab to deflect steam away from the cab windows.
- Also in 1936, pocket steps and extra railings were added to the fireman's side (left side) of the cab to improve access to the bunker.
- In 1937, a drawing was issued for fitting shutters and doors to the older, pre-8750 class, locomotives.
- In 1938, a larger whistle shield was fitted, which became standard for the larger cabs.
- In 1942, a new type of top feed was introduced, with separate clackboxes in a taller cover, and internal delivery pipes rather than trays.

All these changes (with the exception of the new top feed) were later applied to locomotives that had been built earlier. The new top feed became standard for new locomotives in 1944. Some older boilers and locomotives were later fitted with the new top feed, and some locomotives that were built with the new top feed were later changed back to the old design as boilers were swapped.

=== Variants ===
A small number of 5700s were adapted for specific tasks:

- From 1937 to the end of World War II, thirteen 5700s were fitted with spark arresting chimneys for work on industrial and military sites with significant fire risks. (Note: The modified chimney was sometimes referred to as a 'Busby' or a 'bird cage'.)
- In 1958, No. 3711 was converted to oil burning by Robert Stephenson and Hawthorns. (Note: GWR had experimented with converting steam locomotives to oil burning in 1946–50 but the 5700s had not been included.)
- In 1946, No. 7722 was fitted with winding gear to work the Pwllyrhebog Colliery incline on the former Taff Vale Railway.

== Production ==
The first 5700s were built in 1929 by North British Locomotive Co. and, later in the year, at GWR's Swindon Works. Between 1929 and 1931 a total of 300 were built, of which 50 were built by GWR, and the rest by outside contractors:

- Armstrong Whitworth: 25 (Nos. 7775–99)
- W. G. Bagnall: 50 (Nos. 6700–24, 8725–49) (Note: Reputedly, Collett had never heard of W. G. Bagnall before the use of contractors was considered.)
- Beyer, Peacock & Co: 25 (Nos. 8700–24)
- Kerr Stuart: 25 (Nos. 7700–24)
- North British: 100 (Nos. 5700–49, 7725–74)
- Yorkshire Engine Co: 25 (Nos. 6725–49)

It was unusual, but not unprecedented, for GWR to use outside contractors to build locomotives, as 50 of the 200 strong 5600 Class had been built by Armstrong Whitworth. (Note: GWR ordered a total of 306 locomotives from outside contractors between 1923 and 1938.) The building programme was partly funded by interest-free government loans intended to relieve unemployment during the Great Depression. Also, stricter accountancy rules that distinguished between maintenance and building costs meant that it was often economically worthwhile to build new locomotives rather than repair older locomotives.

At first more 5700s were built than were immediately needed, so Nos. 6700–49 were stored for a couple of years before being allocated. Many of these were then assigned to sheds near the South Wales ports of Newport, Barry, Cardiff and Swansea.

After a gap of a year, building started again in 1933, with the 8750 and 9700 classes, and continued until 1950. All the later locomotives, totalling 563, were built at Swindon, and the numbers built only dropped in the last few years with the introduction of the 9400 class in 1947.

=== Numbers built ===
A total of 863 5700s were built and the table below shows the number built by year.

Number of 5700s built by year
Year	1929	1930	1931	1932	1933	1934	1935	1936	1937	1938	1939	1940	1941	1942	1943	1944	1945	1946	1947	1948	1949	1950
Numbers	97	138	65	0	31	49	40	45	50	37	53	32	18	37	26	22	43	29	10	17	14	10

=== Build details ===
The 5700s were specified by 27 different order numbers, or lots, shown below.

Date	Lot No.	No. Built	GWR/BR Numbers	Builder and Numbers	Notes
Jan–Apr 1929	256	50	5700–49	North British Locomotive Co. 23818–67 (Note: Nos. 5700–24 were built at Hyde Park. All other locomotives from North British Locomotive Co. were built at Queens Park.)	Built with vacuum brakes, but without steam heating apparatus or ATC (Automatic Train Control), which were both added later. Delivered with brass number plates (as were all later locomotives built by outside contractors).
Apr–Sep 1929	258	30	5750–79	Swindon Works, GWR	Built with vacuum brakes and steam heating. Fitted with ATC in the following few years. (Note: Ten locomotives (Nos. 5768 and 5770–78) were fitted with boilers where the steam supply to the fountain in the cab was taken in a covered pipe along the tank top from the dome. This feature was later discontinued and the boilers replaced.) Fitted with cast iron number plates (as were all later locomotives built at Swindon).
Dec 1929 – Nov 1930	260	20	5780–99	Swindon Works, GWR	Built with vacuum brakes and steam heating. Nos. 5790–99 were fitted with ATC. Nos. 5780–5789 were fitted with ATC in the following few years.
Dec 1929 – Feb 1930	264	25	7725–49	North British Locomotive Co. 23921–45	Built with vacuum brakes and steam heating. ATC added a few years after delivery.
Jan–Mar 1930	263	25	7700–24	Kerr Stuart 4435–59	Built with vacuum brakes and steam heating. ATC added a few years after delivery. Fitted with riveted tanks (Note: Welding had been standard for GWR panniers for some time. However, the panniers supplied by Bagnall, Kerr Stuart, and Yorkshire Engine were riveted.) and polished brass safety valve covers.
Feb–Oct 1930	262	25	6700–24	W. G. Bagnall 2381–2405	Built with steam brakes only and three link couplings. Fitted with riveted tanks.
Mar 1930 – Jan 1931	265	25	6725–49	Yorkshire Engine Co. 2249–73	Built with steam brakes only and three link couplings. Fitted with riveted tanks.
Nov 1930 – Jan 1931	271	25	7775–99	Armstrong Whitworth 1131–55	Built with vacuum brakes and steam heating apparatus (as were all later locomotives). ATC added on arrival at Swindon (as were all later locomotives supplied by contractors). Fitted with polished brass safety valve covers.
Dec 1930 – Sep 1931	272	25	8725–49	W. G. Bagnall 2422–46	Fitted with riveted tanks and polished brass safety valve covers.
Feb–Apr 1931	273	25	8700–24	Beyer Peacock 6680–6704	Fitted with polished brass safety valve covers. Includes the first No. 8700, which was later modified as the prototype for the 9700 class, and was renumbered No. 9700 in January 1934.
Nov 1930 – Mar 1931	274	25	7750–74	North British Locomotive Co. 24038–62	
Sep–Dec 1933	282	10	9701–10	Swindon Works, GWR	Built for working on London Transport lines. Built with new style cab, condensing equipment, Weir pump, modified ATC (to lift clear of central rail), and tripcock brake valves.
Sep 1933 – Mar 1934	282	49	8750–98	Swindon Works, GWR	Built with new style cab, ATC, steam heating, and vacuum brakes. This was the standard equipment for all later locomotives (with the exception of Nos. 6751–59 (Lot No. 362, 1947) which were for shunting only).
Mar 1934	282	1	8700	Swindon Works, GWR	The second No. 8700. The first was modified with condensing equipment and new cab as the prototype for the 9700 class. The old cab was saved and fitted to the new No. 8700.
Jun 1934	285	1	8799	Swindon Works, GWR	
Jun 1934 – Jun 1935	285	49	9711–59	Swindon Works, GWR	
Sep 1935 – Jul 1936	293	25	9760–84	Swindon Works, GWR	Whistle shields were introduced (probably first to No. 9773).
May 1936 – Sep 1936	299	15	9785–99	Swindon Works, GWR	Pocket steps and extra handrails were added to the left of the bunker. First fitted to No. 9795.
Sep 1936 – Aug 1937	299	35	3700–34	Swindon Works, GWR	
Aug 1937 – Sep 1938	306	50	3735–84	Swindon Works, GWR	A larger whistle shield was introduced and first fitted to No. 3774.
Sep–Dec 1938	314	15	3785–99	Swindon Works, GWR	
Dec 1938 – Jul 1939	314	35	3600–34	Swindon Works, GWR	
Sep 1939 – Jul 1940	325	50	3635–84	Swindon Works, GWR	
Dec 1940 – Sep 1941	330	15	3685–99	Swindon Works, GWR	
Sep 1941 – Nov 1942	330	35	4600–34	Swindon Works, GWR	
Dec 1942 – Jun 1943	336	26	4635–60	Swindon Works, GWR	
Oct 1943 – Feb 1945	352	39	4661–99	Swindon Works, GWR	
Feb–Oct 1945	352	22	9600–21	Swindon Works, GWR	
Nov 1945 – Mar 1946	355	20	9622–41	Swindon Works, GWR	
Apr–Jun 1946	356	10	9642–51	Swindon Works, GWR	
Nov–Dec 1946	362	10	9652–61	Swindon Works, GWR	
Jun–Sep 1947	362	10	6750–59	Swindon Works, GWR	Built with steam brakes only and three link couplings.
Apr–Jun 1948	370	11	9662–72	Swindon Works, BR	
Nov 1948 – Jan 1949	374	10	6760–69	Swindon Works, BR	Built with smokebox number plates, as were all later locomotives.
Feb–May 1949	378	10	9673–82	Swindon Works, BR	
Nov–Dec 1950	379	10	6770–79	Swindon Works, BR	

=== Costs ===
Some known costs (either GWR's out-shop value or cost from contractors) are shown below, along with estimated equivalent values for 2013.

5700s costs
GWR No.	Builder	Date	Cost	2013 labour cost (Note: Relative value calculated using a wage index. Specific values calculated here.)	2013 economic cost (Note: Relative value calculated as a proportion of the total output of the economy. Specific values calculated here.)
5764	Swindon Works, GWR	Jun 1929	£2,651 (Note: For comparison GWR Hall class No. 4953 Pitchford Hall, also built at Swindon in 1929, cost £4,375.)	£419,500	£894,900
7714	Kerr Stuart (Note: The 5700s built by Kerr Stuart were amongst the last built by the company. See Kerr Stuart in liquidation for details.)	Apr 1930	£1,160	£185,000	£398,100
7754	North British Locomotive Co.	Dec 1930	£2,800	£446,500	£961,000
3650	Swindon Works, GWR	Dec 1939	£2,844	£414,100	£761,200
4612	Swindon Works, GWR	Feb 1942	£3,451	£425,000	£576,500
9682	Swindon Works, BR	May 1949	£5,280	£429,900	£657,200

== Numbering and liveries ==
The size of the class demanded that the 5700 class locomotives were spread across several series of numbers.

- 3600 – 3699
- 3700 – 3799
- 4600 – 4699
- 5700 – 5799
- 6700 – 6779
- 7700 – 7799
- 8700 – 8799
- 9600 – 9682
- 9700 – 9799

The different series started in the following chronological order; 57xx (1929), 77xx (1929), 67xx (1930), 87xx (1931), 97xx (1933), 37xx (1936), 36xx (1938), 46xx (1941), and 96xx (1945). GWR locomotives were not renumbered after nationalisation, but a W (for Western Region) was temporarily added to some locomotives.

The first 5700s built were painted in the standard GWR livery of the time; mainly green above the running plate with the words "GREAT WESTERN" painted in yellow letters with red and black shadowing on the side of the pannier tanks, buffer beams painted red with the number shown in yellow letters with black shadowing, and the front of the smokebox and chimney were black. From 1934 the GWR "shirtbutton" roundel replaced "GREAT WESTERN". From 1942 GWR replaced the roundel with the letters "G W R", in yellow letters with red and black shading. Due to wartime shortages, most locomotives (apart from the Kings and Castles) were painted black from 1942 to 1945.

After nationalisation, some 5700s were painted in BR green with the words "BRITISH RAILWAYS" on the side of the pannier tanks, but unlined black soon became the standard for tank locomotives, with the BR crest on the sides of the pannier tanks. Some 5700s also had white and red lining on the pannier tanks and cab sides. The BR crest was changed in 1957.

The 5700s bought by London Transport between 1956 and 1963 were repainted in the standard LT maroon livery with yellow and black lining. Those bought by NCB were painted in a light green.

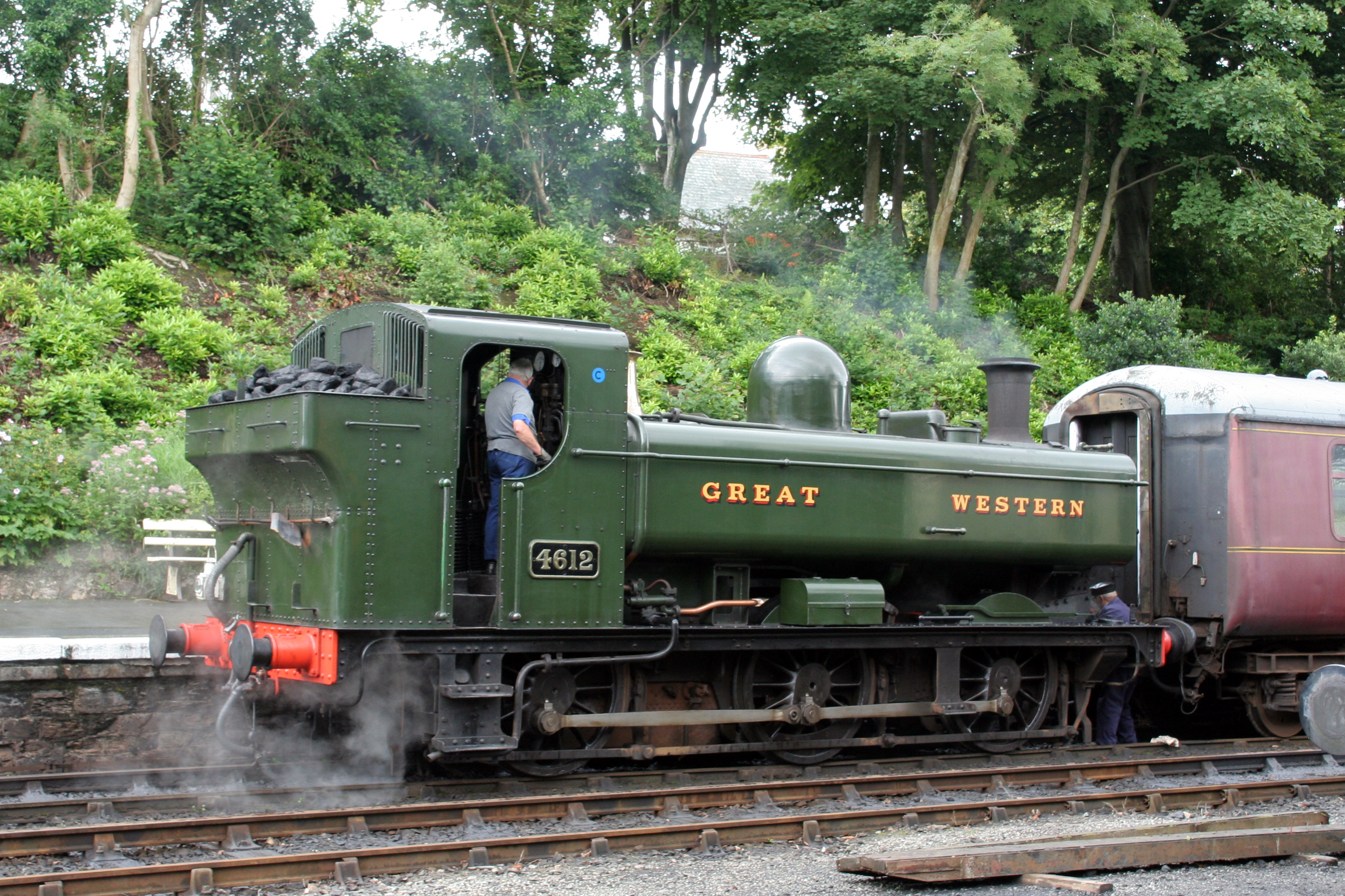
1929-34 GWR livery

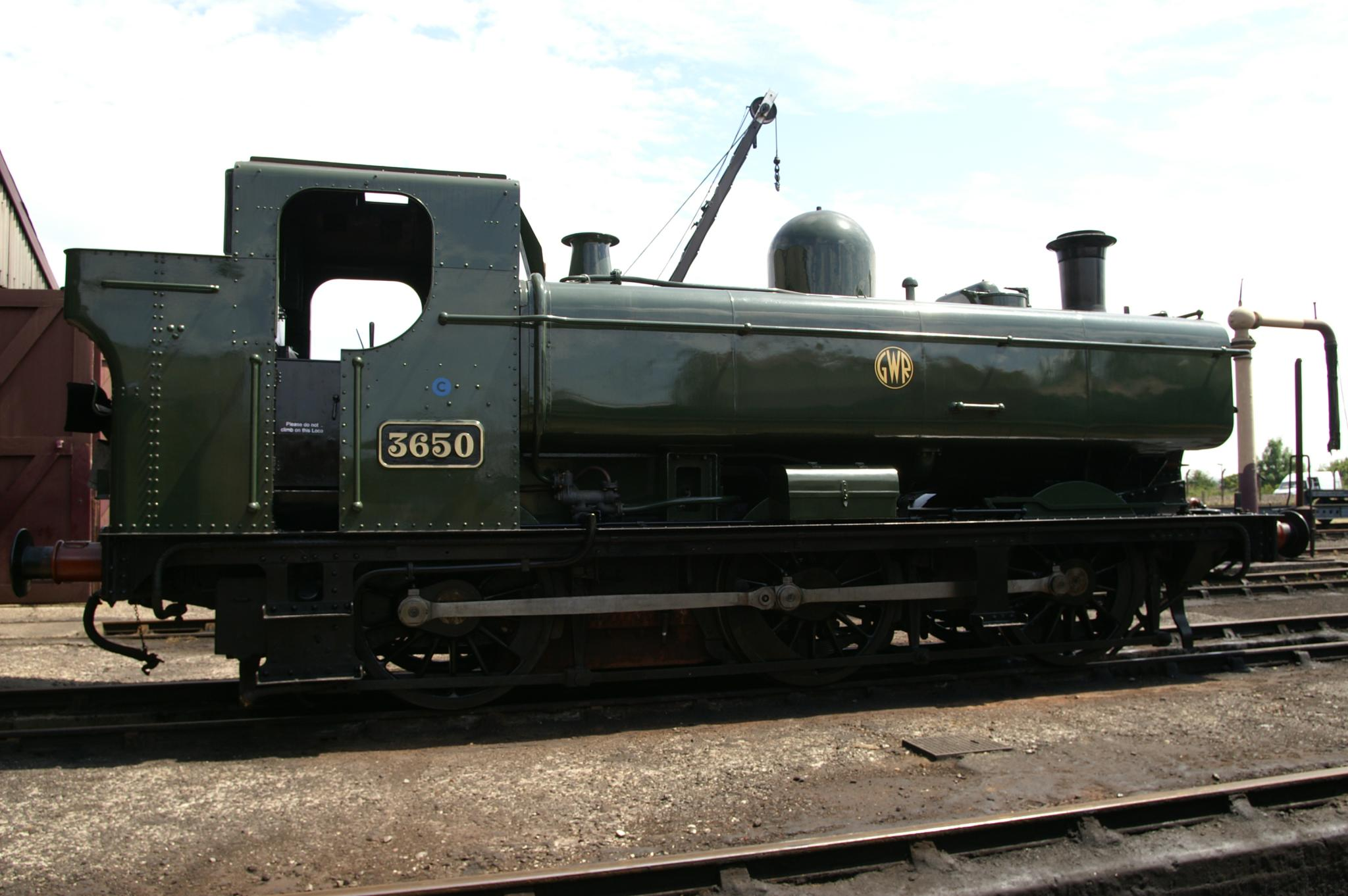
1934-42 GWR livery

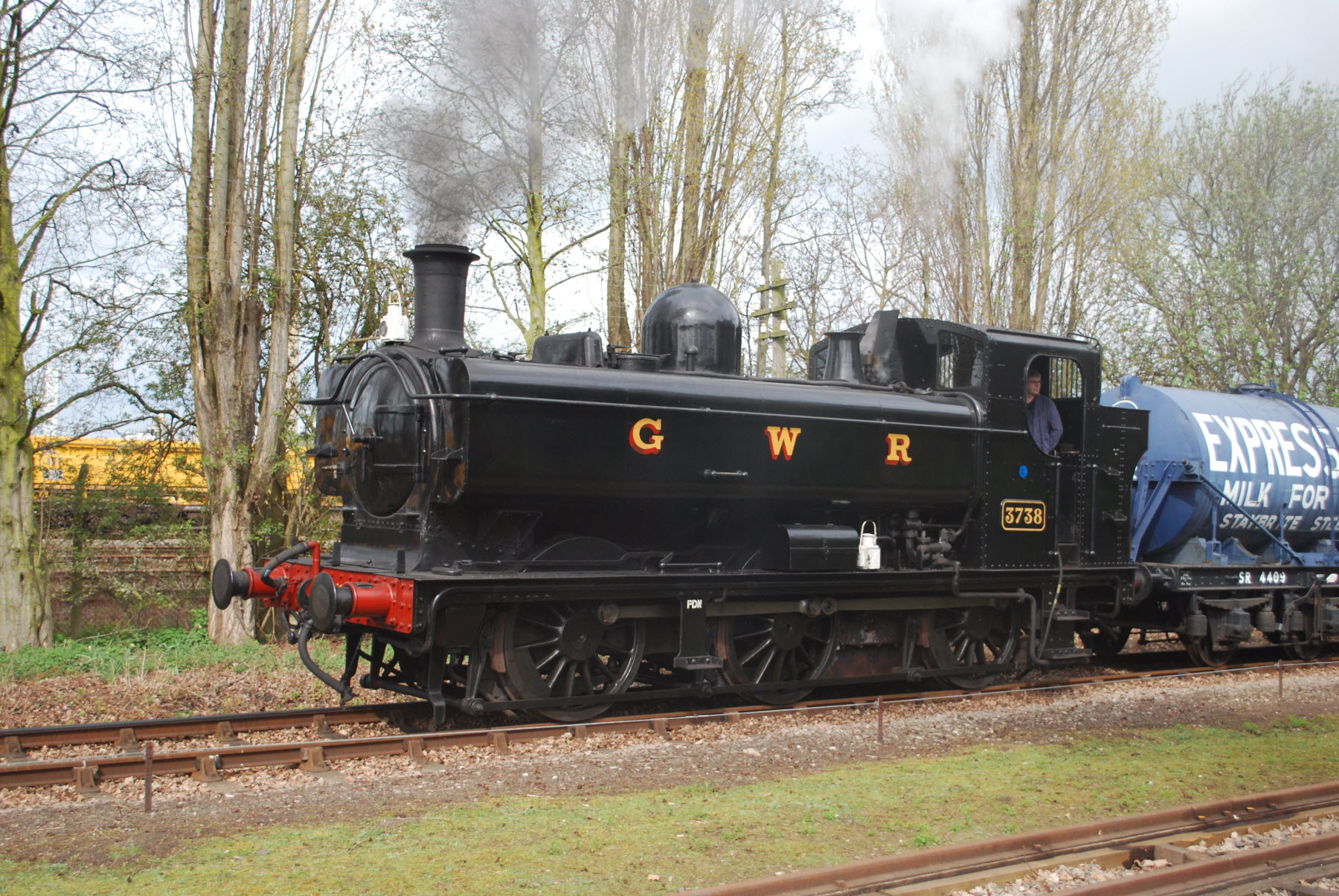
1942-45 Wartime black

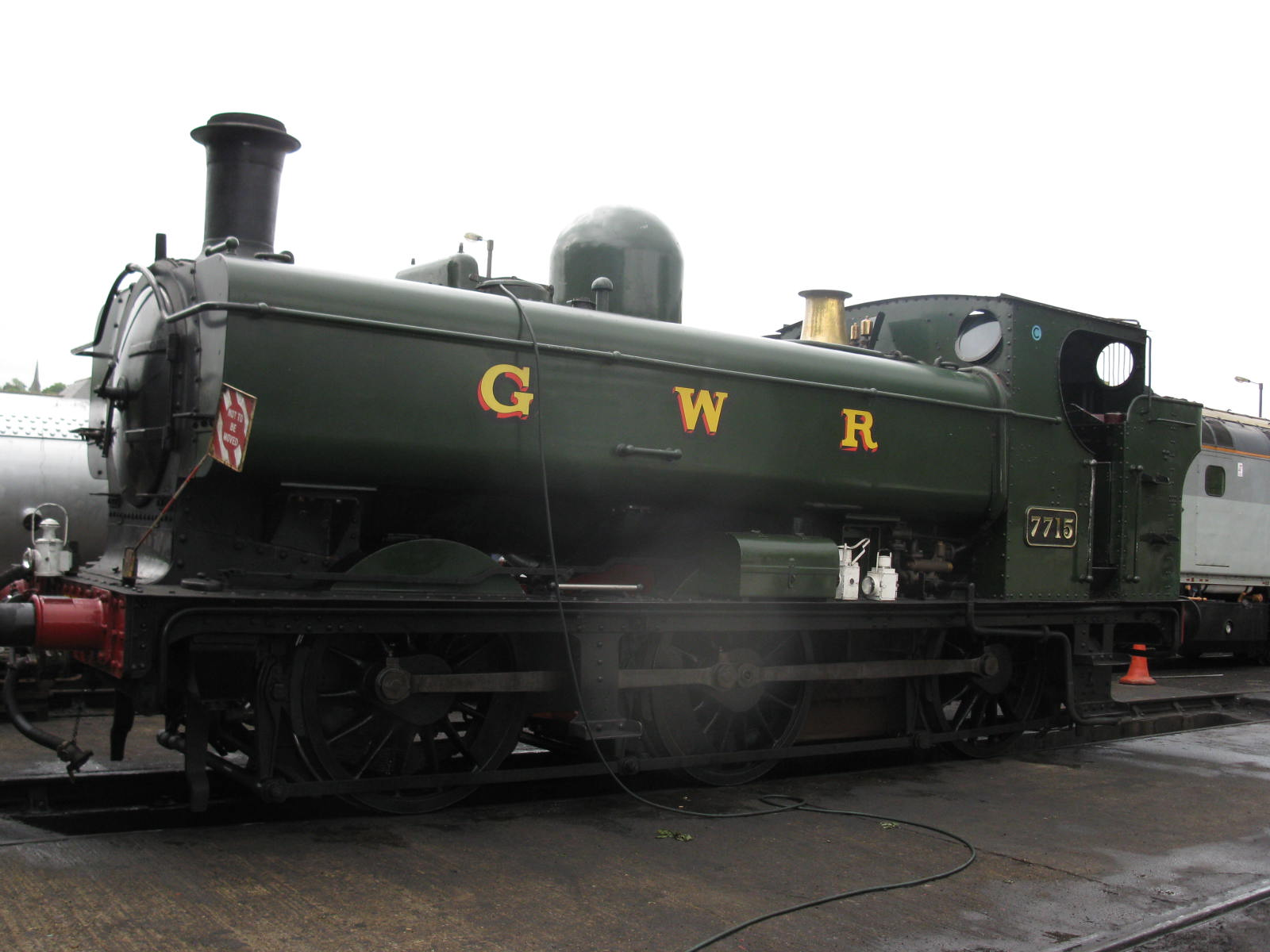
1942-47 GWR livery

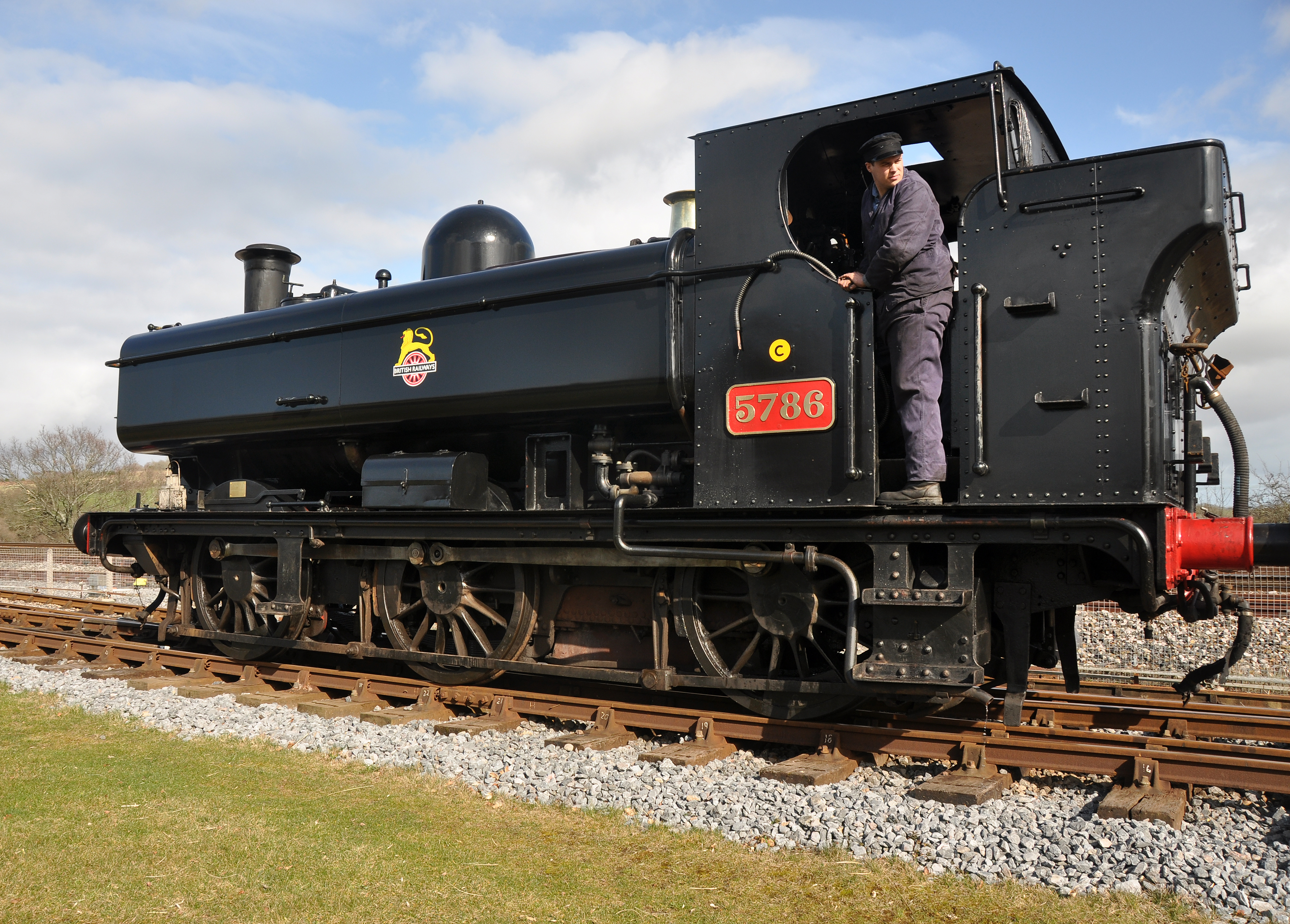
BR black livery

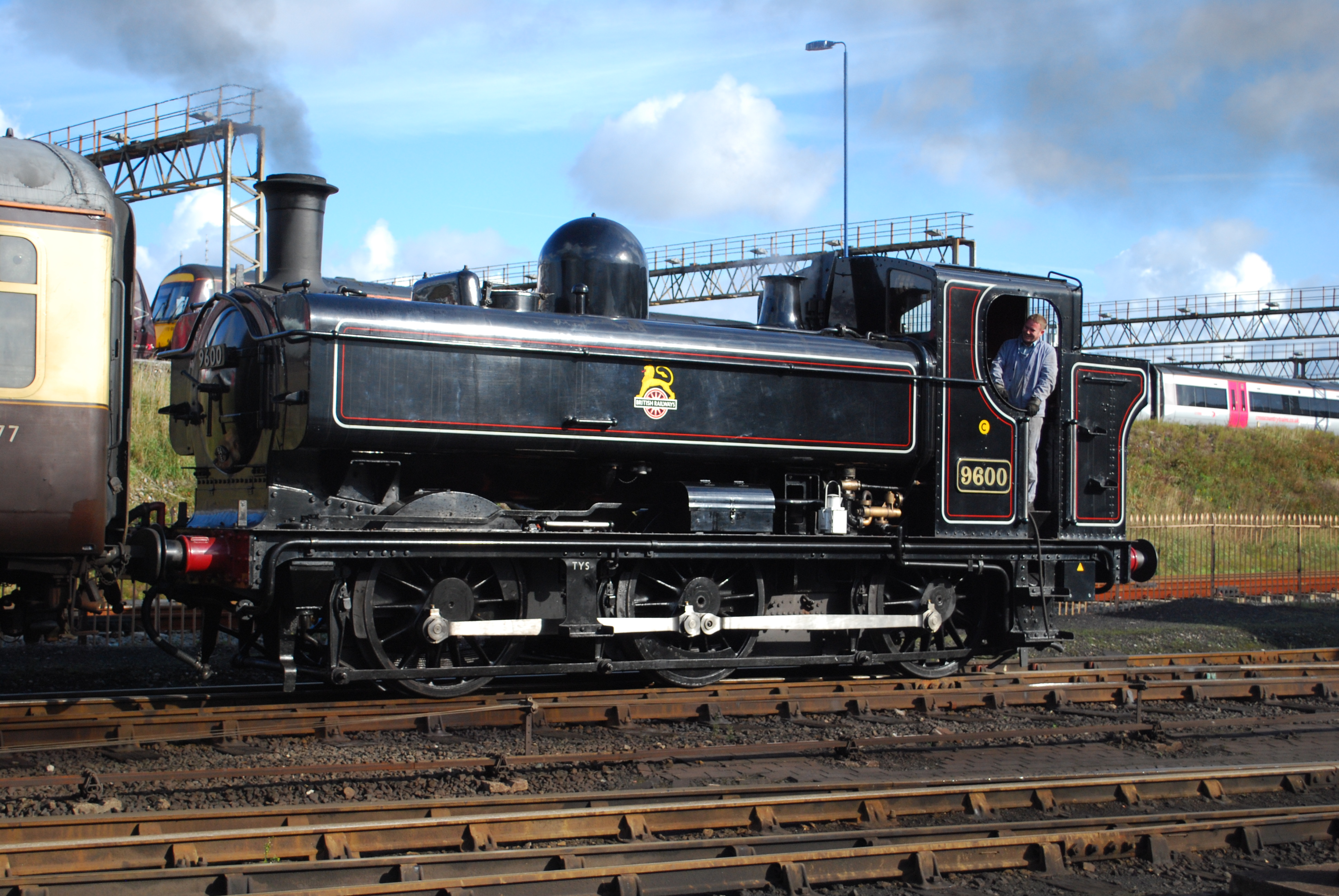
BR lined livery

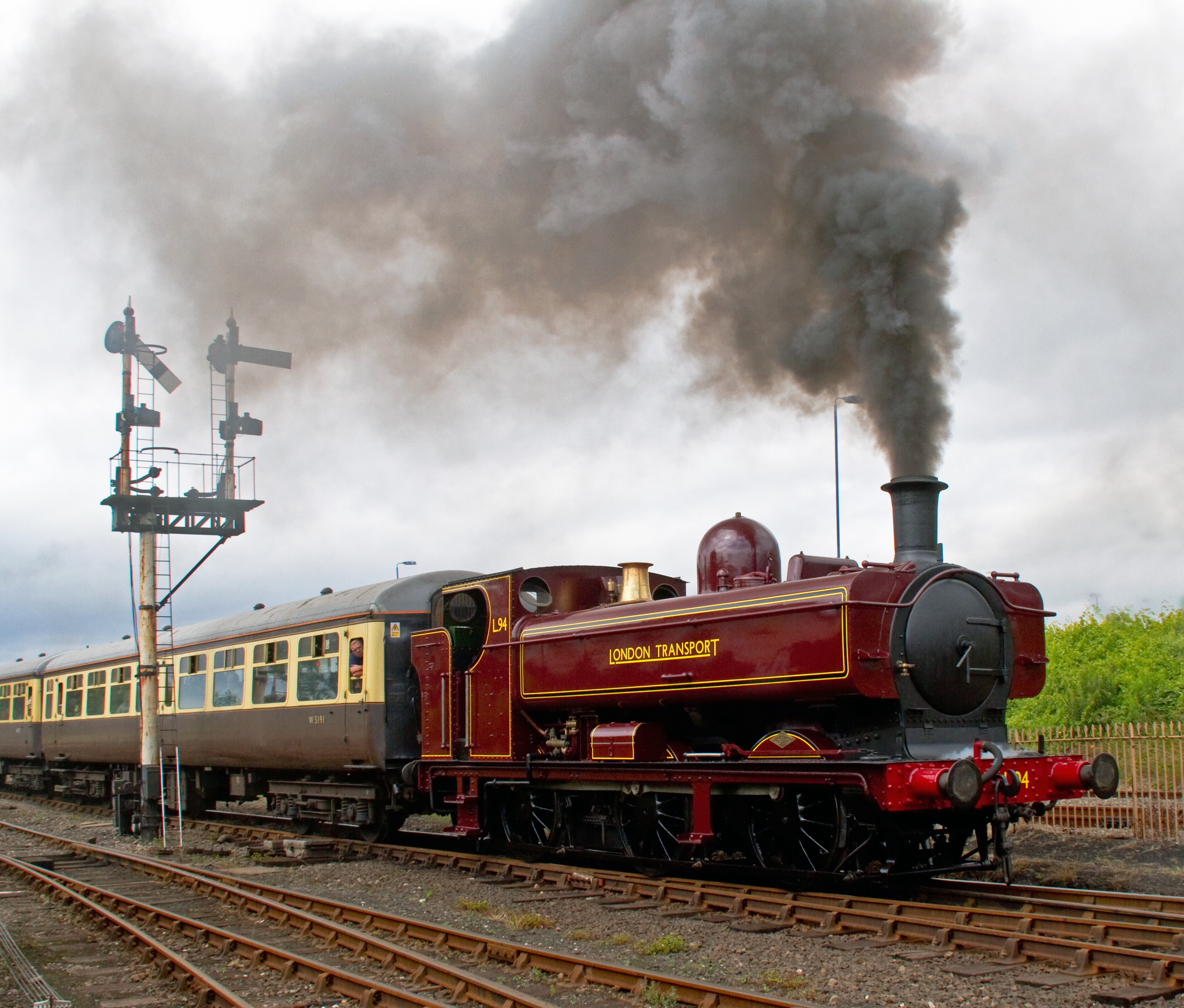
LT livery

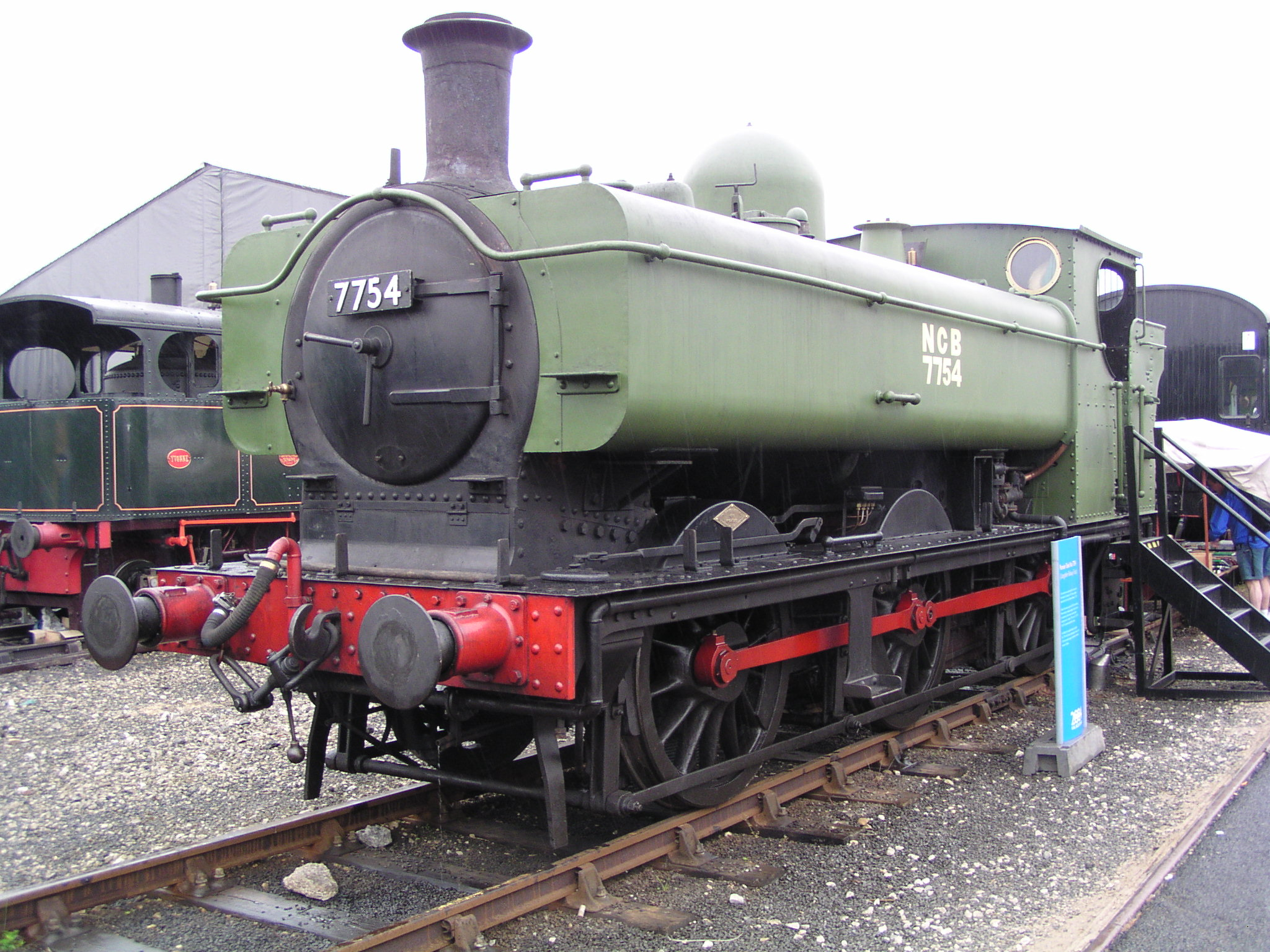
NCB livery

== Operation ==
The 5700s were used on GWR for various duties including shunting, pilot work, and light to medium goods. They were also used on branch, commuter and shorter mainline passenger trains. They were also used on standby for more powerful locomotives, sometimes producing "firework displays" as they strived to keep to the schedule with heavier loads.

The 5700s were never fitted remote control gear for working autotrains. This was left to smaller pannier locomotives that followed; the 5400 Class (introduced in 1930) and the 6400 Class (introduced in 1932).

The 9700s (fitted with condensing equipment for underground working) and built specifically for working the line between Paddington and Smithfield, were allocated to Old Oak Common.

The 6700s (built for shunting only and kept in storage for a couple of years because of a lack of suitable work) eventually found their niche working the marshalling yards between the South Wales coalfields and the coal exporting docks of Llanelli, Swansea, Cardiff, Barry and Newport. Some were allocated to just one shed for their entire working life (Nos. 6700–9 at Cardiff East Dock and Nos. 6725–32 at Newport, Pill). A number of 6700s were also allocated to Swindon, with 6733–41 spending a long time there.

Thirteen 5700s were fitted with spark arresting chimneys for working in industrial and military systems and sidings, particularly the War Department ammunition dump at Milton, near Didcot during World War II.

The Pwllyrhebog Colliery incline on the former Taff Vale Railway was a 3/4 mile (1.2 km) 1-in-13 incline with a continuous rope cable so that a descending train was partially counterbalanced by an ascending train. The locomotives (Taff Vale Railway H class) on the incline were fitted with coned boilers so that there was always sufficient water above the firebox. To provide additional control and power a stationary locomotive, fitted with two intergeared drums, controlled the cable. No. 2750 Class 2721 had been fitted with the necessary winding gear to control the incline in 1935, but was withdrawn in 1945, and replaced by 5700 No. 7722 which was fitted with the winding gear in 1946. Operation of the incline ended in 1952.

=== Allocation ===
The 5700s' route classification (Blue) meant that they were allowed on approximately 70% of the GWR network. By 1938 only 15 (Note: The 15 sheds were Abercynon, Aberystwyth, Bristol (Bath Road), Carmarthen, Croes Newydd, Didcot, Ferndale, Fishguard, Machynlleth, Oswestry, Radyr, Treherbert, Truro, Weymouth and Whitland.) (out of approximately 70) running sheds did not have any 5700s allocated.

In 1950, the route classification was changed to Yellow because of the 5700s' low hammer blow. The change did not apply to Nos. 9700–10. This meant that 5700s were now allowed on almost 90% of the old GWR network (roughly equivalent to the new Western Region of British Rail). By 1954, only five running sheds (Abercynon, Aberystwyth, Machynlleth, Treherbert and Truro) did not have any 5700s allocated.

=== BR working ===
In the early years of British Railways, the boundaries between the Western and the Southern Region changed a number of times. 5700s took up new duties in a variety of places:

- At Weymouth, 5700s operated the branch line to the Isle of Portland (replacing LSWR O2 class 0-4-4T locomotives). They were also seen pulling boat trains through the streets of Weymouth.
- Six 5700s were allocated to Nine Elms and worked empty stock between Waterloo and Clapham Junction (replacing LSWR M7 class 0-4-4T locomotives).
- The short Folkestone Harbour branch line from Folkestone Harbour station to Folkestone Junction was always problematic when hauling heavy boat trains up the 1-in-36 incline. Six 5700s were allocated to Dover for working (including banking) on the branch (replacing SER R1 class 0-6-0T locomotives).

The last scheduled passenger trains hauled by 5700s on BR were on seen London Midland Region on the Wrexham to New Brighton route (passing over old LNER territory). The Wrexham to Seacombe service ended at the beginning of 1960 but was immediately replaced by a DMU service between Wrexham and New Brighton. The service on Bank Holidays was so popular that demand outstripped available DMUs, and a relief train of four coaches pulled by No. 3749 was laid on. Two more 5700s were used over the Spring Bank Holiday that year, but from then BR Standard Class 4 2-6-4T locomotives usually handled the relief services. In 1965, 5700s were used for the last time on Whit Monday and August Bank Holiday relief services.

The 5700s were the last steam locomotives used on Western Region. The last working locomotives were allocated to Croes Newydd, and were working goods trains and shunting until November 1966. (Note: Although British Rail had banned steam on its mainlines from August 1968, the 5700s bought by London Transport did sometimes travel on British Rail lines near Lillie Bridge.) By the end of the steam era, the record keeping of allocations and working of local steam locomotives was rather lax, and it was not unknown for locomotives to be used after being officially withdrawn. For many years Nos. 4646, 4696, and 9774 were thought to be the last ex-GWR locomotives to work on British Rail, but No. 9641 was also still in steam at Croes Newydd at the same time.

=== 5700s at work ===
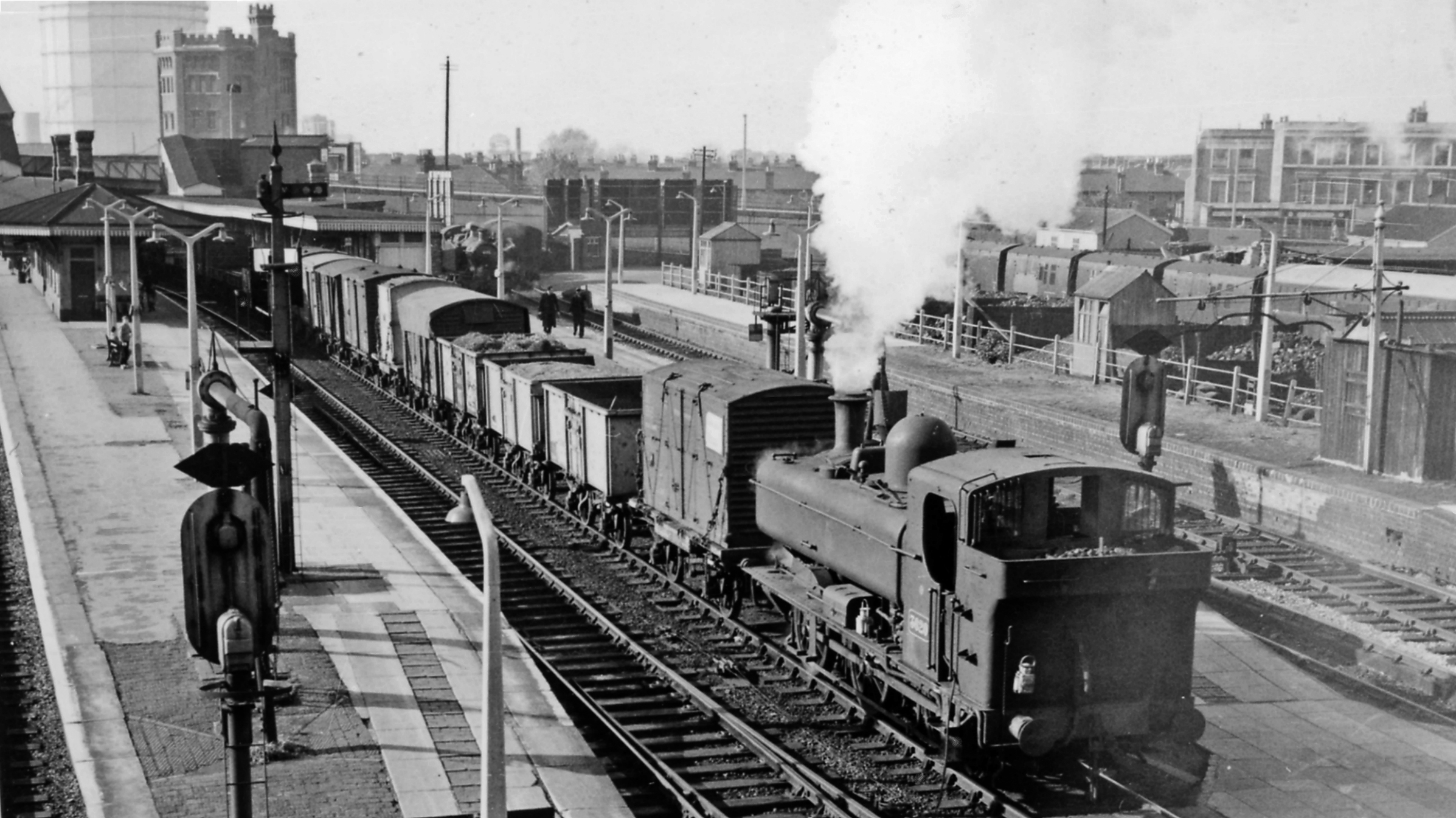
No. 3620 with a typical goods train at Southall station

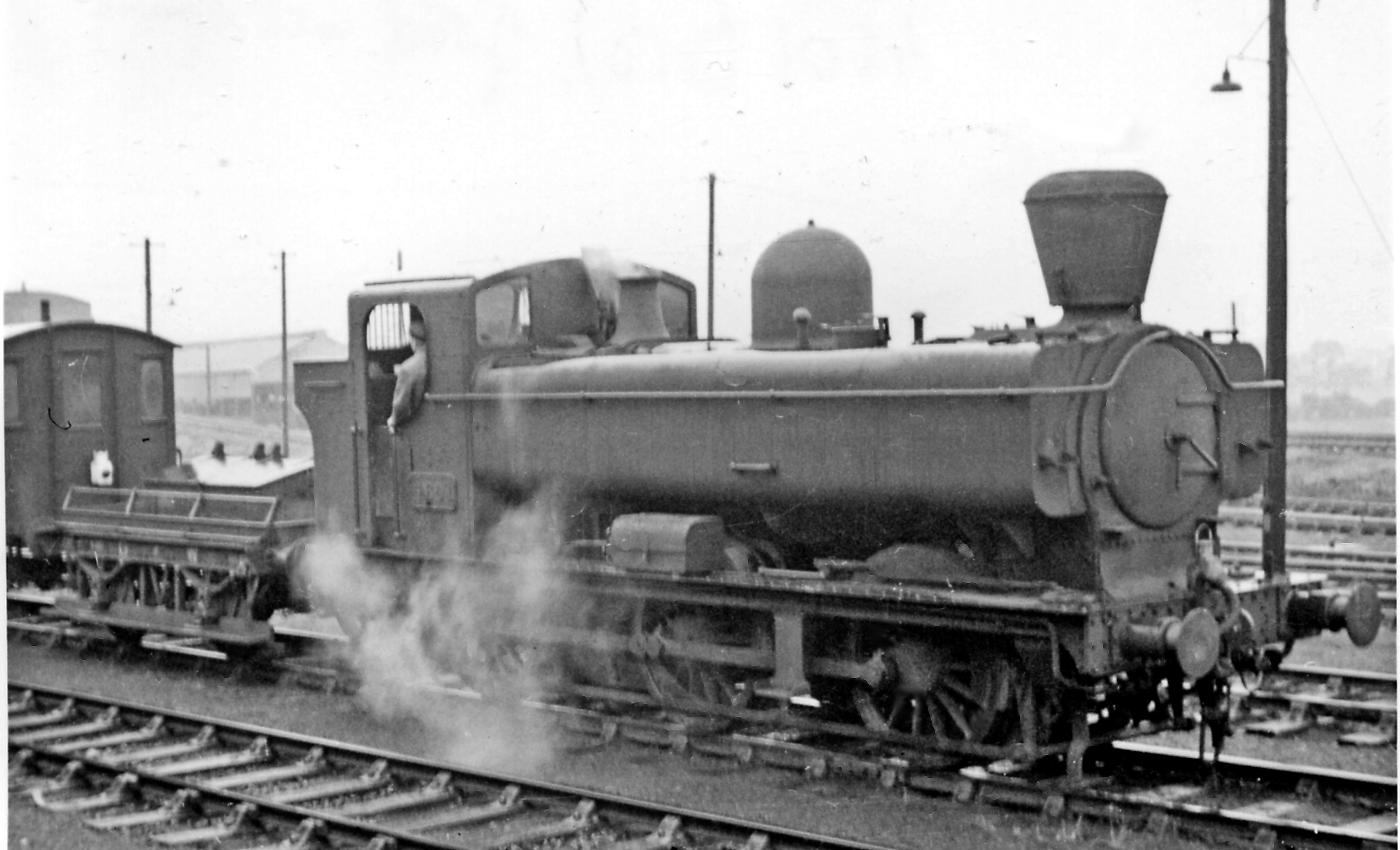
No. 4601 with spark arresting chimney for shunting at the WD sidings at Milton

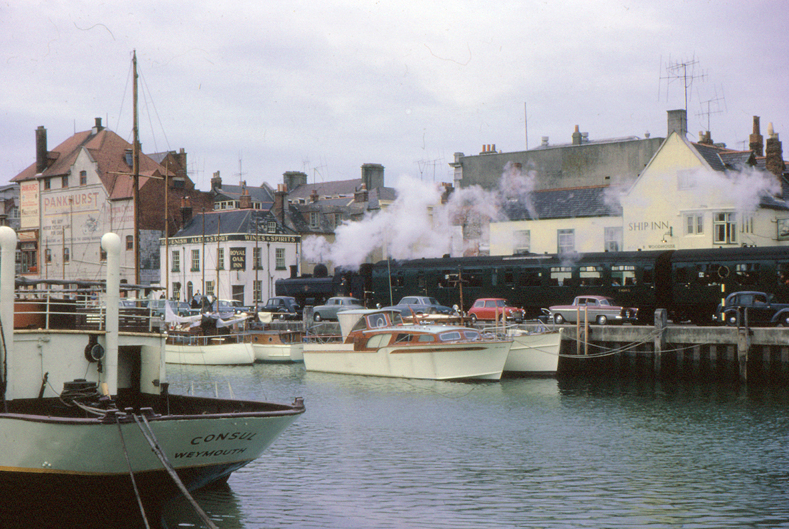
A boat train on the quayside at Weymouth with No. 4624

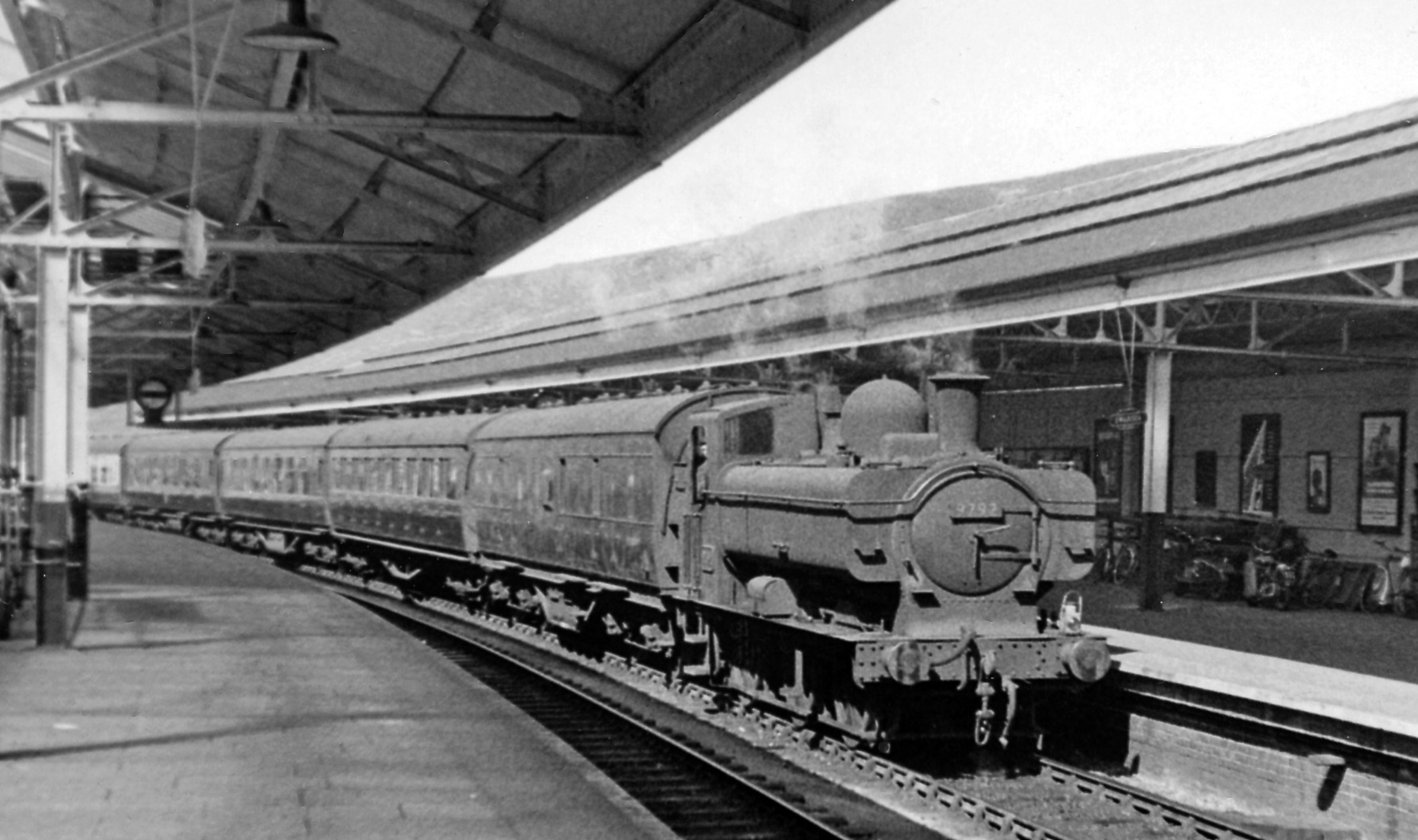
No. 9792 hauling empty stock at Swansea High Street station

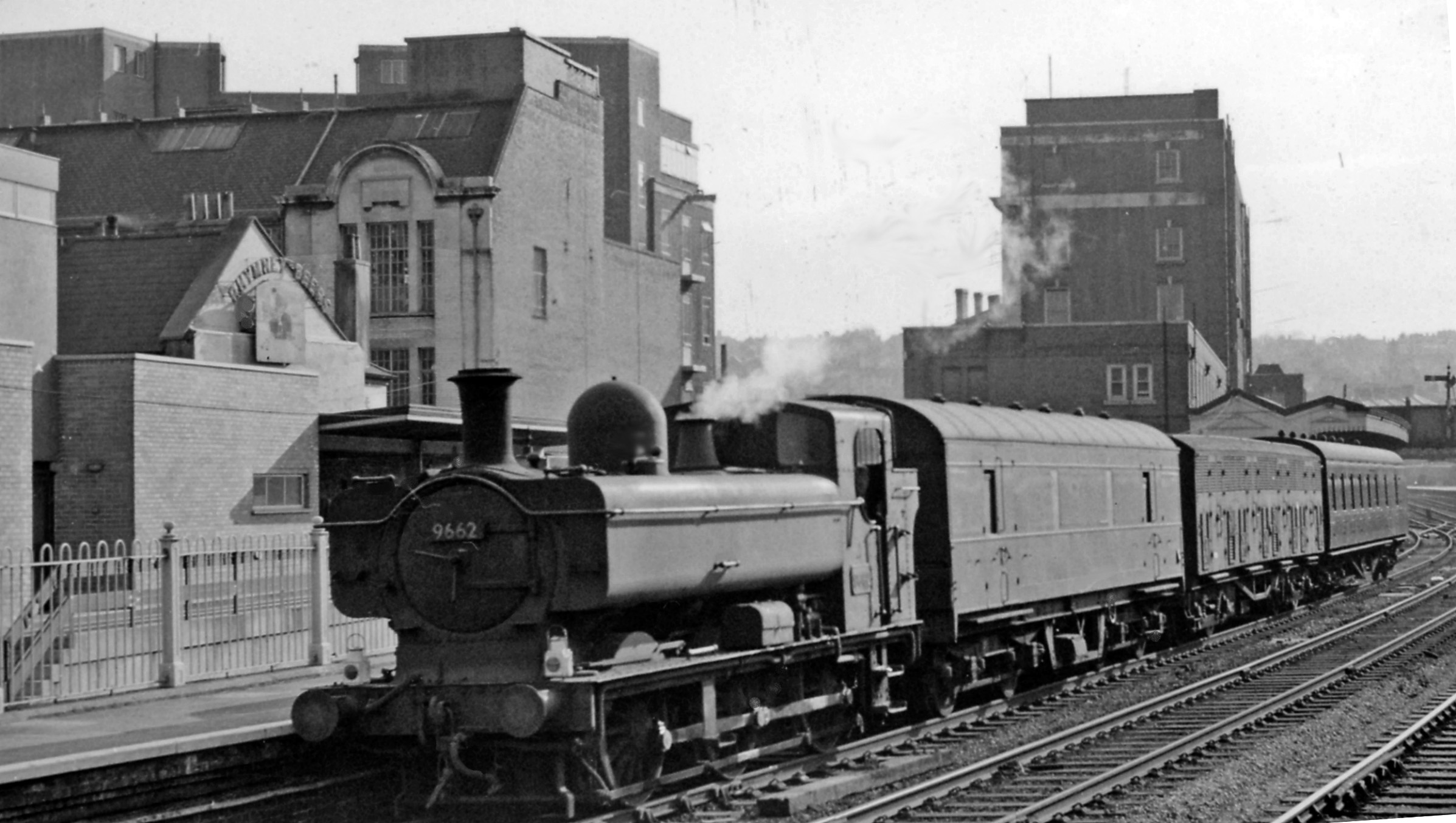
No. 9662 on pilot duty at Newport High Street station

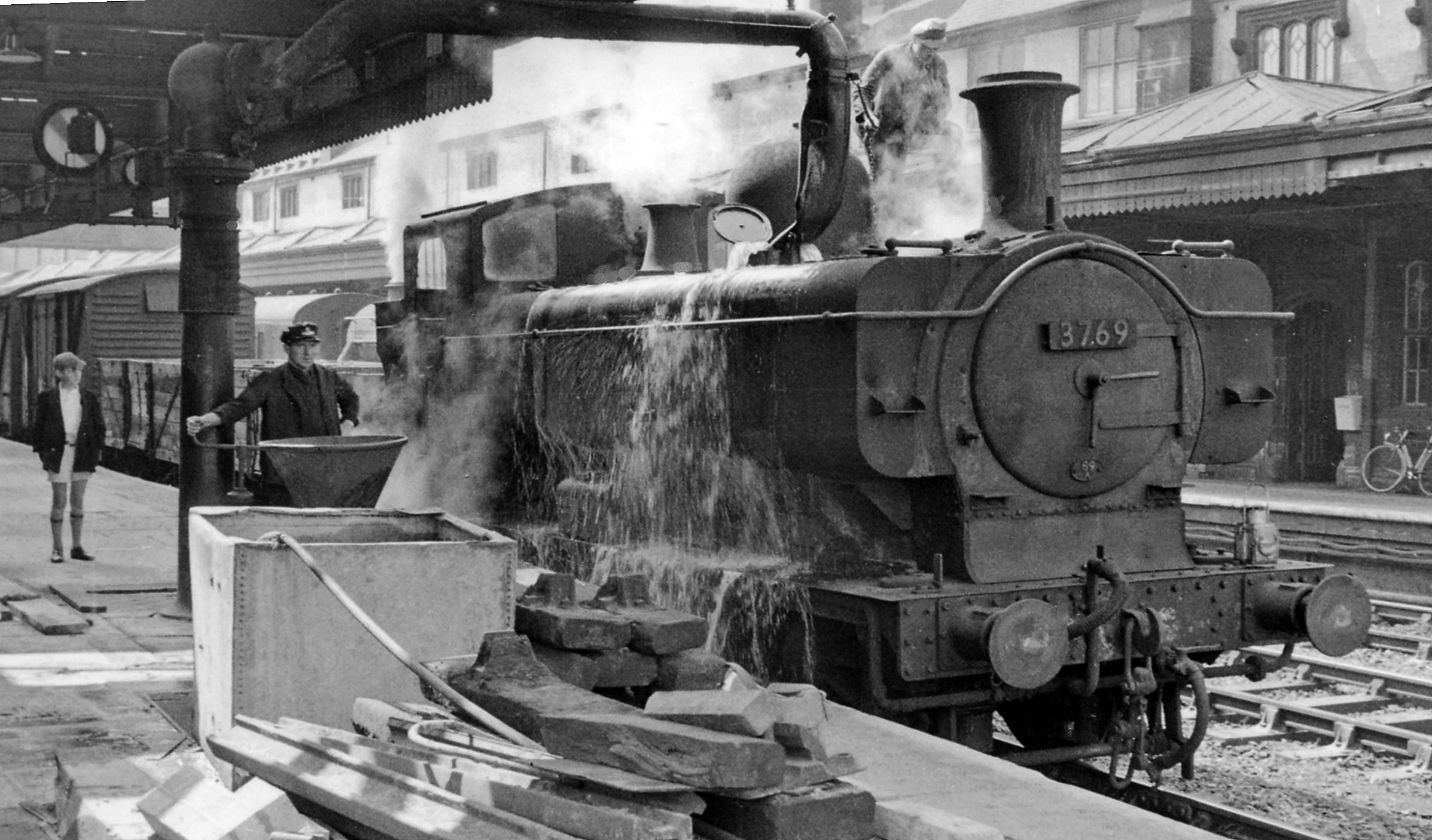
No. 3769 taking on water at Shrewsbury station

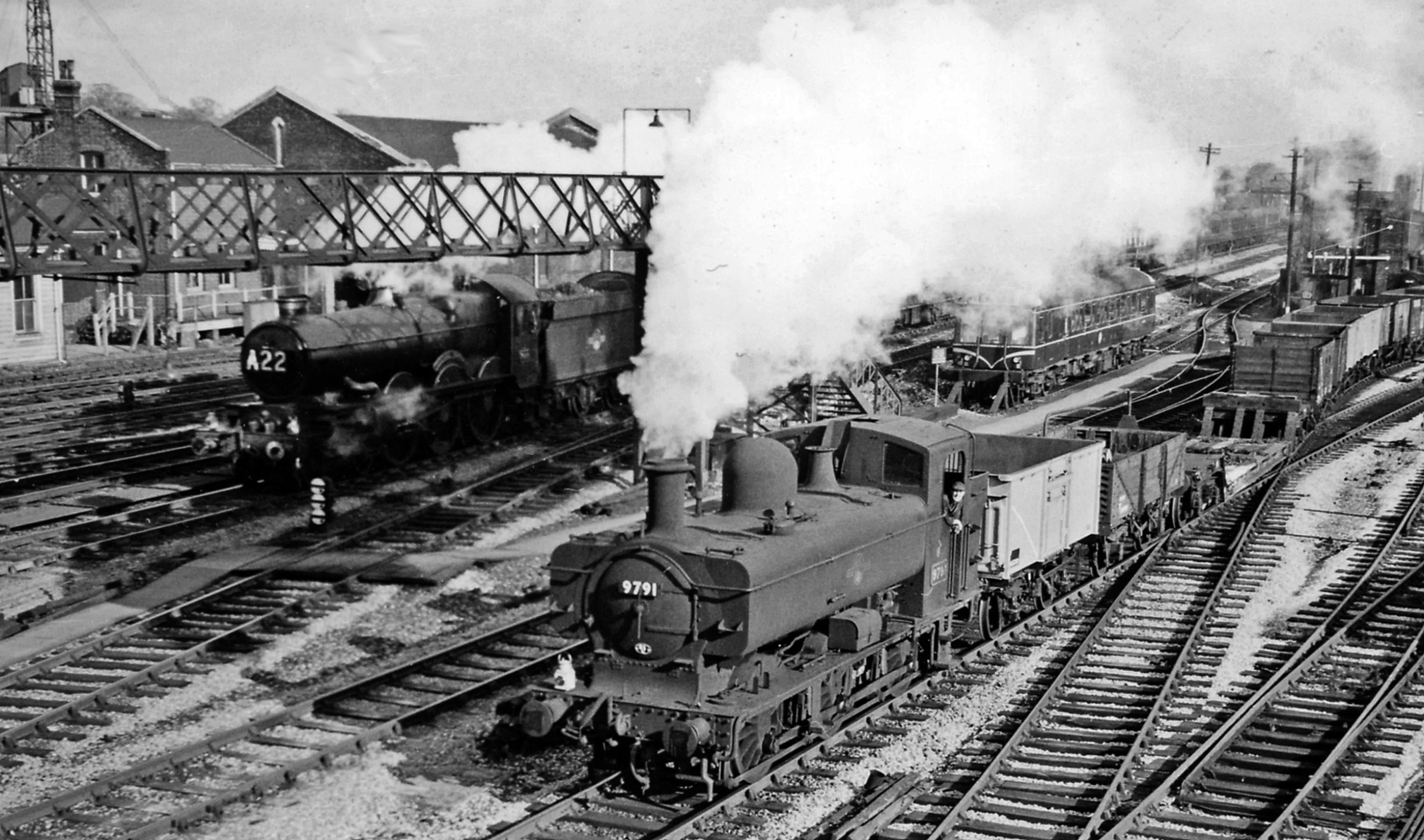
No. 9791 racing Castle Class No. 7006 Lydford Castle at Southall

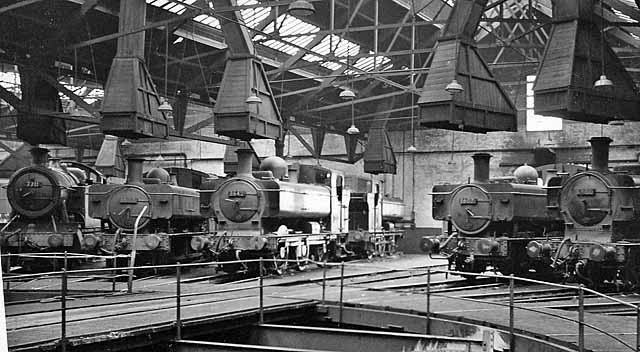
Llanelly depot - Nos. 7211 (7200 class), 1633 (1600 class), 3642 (5700 class), 1607 (1600 class) and 5722 (5700 class)

== Accidents and incidents ==
- On 26 August 1940, a bombing raid destroyed a goods shed at Bordesley, West Midlands. During the raid Peter Smout, an 18-year-old engine cleaner who was acting as the fireman on a shunter, volunteered to drive No. 7758 to pull wagons out of the blazing goods shed. He made three more trips. He was assisted by Frederick Blake, a wagon examiner and a navy veteran from World War I, who operated the points levers. When they finished, the right hand side of the footplate was too hot to touch, and Blake had to use his hat to work the points as the levers were also too hot to touch. Both men were awarded the George Medal for their courage. (Note: During the raid, both men also extinguished fires from incendiary bombs. Frederick Blake was later quoted as saying "these blitzes seem tame to me" (in comparison to his experiences in World War I). His medals were sold in 2007.)
- On 11 November 1960, whilst hauling an unfitted coal train down a gradient, No. 9737 ran away and collided with a diesel multiple unit at Pontrhydyfen, Glamorgan. Two people were killed and 20 were injured.
- On 7 December 1961, a locomotive of the class was in collision with a freight train at Bodmin General station, Cornwall due to a faulty signal failing to give a clear danger aspect.

== Other pannier tank locomotives ==
There were numerous other classes of pannier tanks built by the GWR. The majority belonged to two "families" of "large" and "small" designs. Others included absorbed stock, more specialised types and conversions of tender locos. The two main groups were:

- A "large" group originally featuring saddle tanks (or in a few cases side tanks), 4 ft 6 in driving wheels and double frames e.g. 1076 Class or inside frames GWR 645 Class, culminating in the 9400 Class.
- A "small" group originally built at Wolverhampton Works with saddle tanks and driving wheels of 4 ft commencing with the GWR 850 Class and culminating in the 1600 Class

For example, within the "small" group, the GWR 5400 Class locomotives were derived from the William Dean-designed GWR 2021 Class (an enlargement of the 850 Class), with larger wheels for higher top speed and fitted with autotrain apparatus ('auto-fitted') for push-pull passenger work. The GWR 6400 Class were similar to the 5400 Class, also being auto-fitted, but having the same size wheels as the 5700. The GWR 7400 Class were very similar to the 6400 Class, but were not auto-fitted and had a higher boiler pressure.

Within the "large" group, the GWR 9400 Class was the post-war updated design of the 8750 variant of the 57xx: heavier and longer, but nominally no more powerful, using the same taper boiler as the GWR 2251 Class.

For a list of classes, see GWR 0-6-0PT.

== Withdrawal and mileages ==
After the 1955 Modernisation Plan, the reduction in branch line work and the introduction of diesel shunters, the Western Region embarked on a dieselisation programme which, along with a reduction in branch line work, reduced the demand for the services of the 5700s. Withdrawal from service with BR started in 1956 and was completed in 1966.

Twenty locomotives were sold and continued in use until 1971 by the London Transport and 1975 by the National Coal Board.

Withdrawal of 5700s from BR
Year	1956	1957	1958	1959	1960	1961	1962	1963	1964	1965	1966
Numbers	4	16	48	67	67	67	170	114	144	139	27

le Fleming noted that the mileages of those withdrawn between March 1956 and March 1958 ranged "between 500,000 and 556,000". Some other known mileages are shown below.

5700s mileages
Number	Built	Withdrawn	Mileage
3650	Dec 1939	Sep 1963	493,100 mi (793,600 km)
3738	Sep 1937	Jul 1963	500,000 mi (800,000 km)
4612	Feb 1942	Jul 1965	427,707 mi (688,328 km)
5764	Jun 1929	(Dec 1963) (Note: withdrawn from BR May 1960. Mileage from later LT records.)	668,771 mi (1,076,283 km)
7714	Apr 1930	Jan 1959	520,259 mi (837,276 km)
9629	Dec 1945	(Sep 1961) (Note: Date of last Heavy General Overhaul (H/G). Withdrawn Oct 1964.)	385,188 mi (619,900 km)
9682	May 1949	Aug 1965	over 250,000 mi (400,000 km)

== Use after British Railways ==
Nineteen 5700s were sold for further use after being withdrawn by British Railways. The National Coal Board (NCB) bought five, one was bought by P.D. Fuels, and thirteen were bought by London Transport.

One more locomotive, No. 9642, was withdrawn in 1964 and sold to Hayes Scrapyard. It was used for three years to shunt other locomotives being scrapped, and was later saved for preservation.

=== London Transport ===
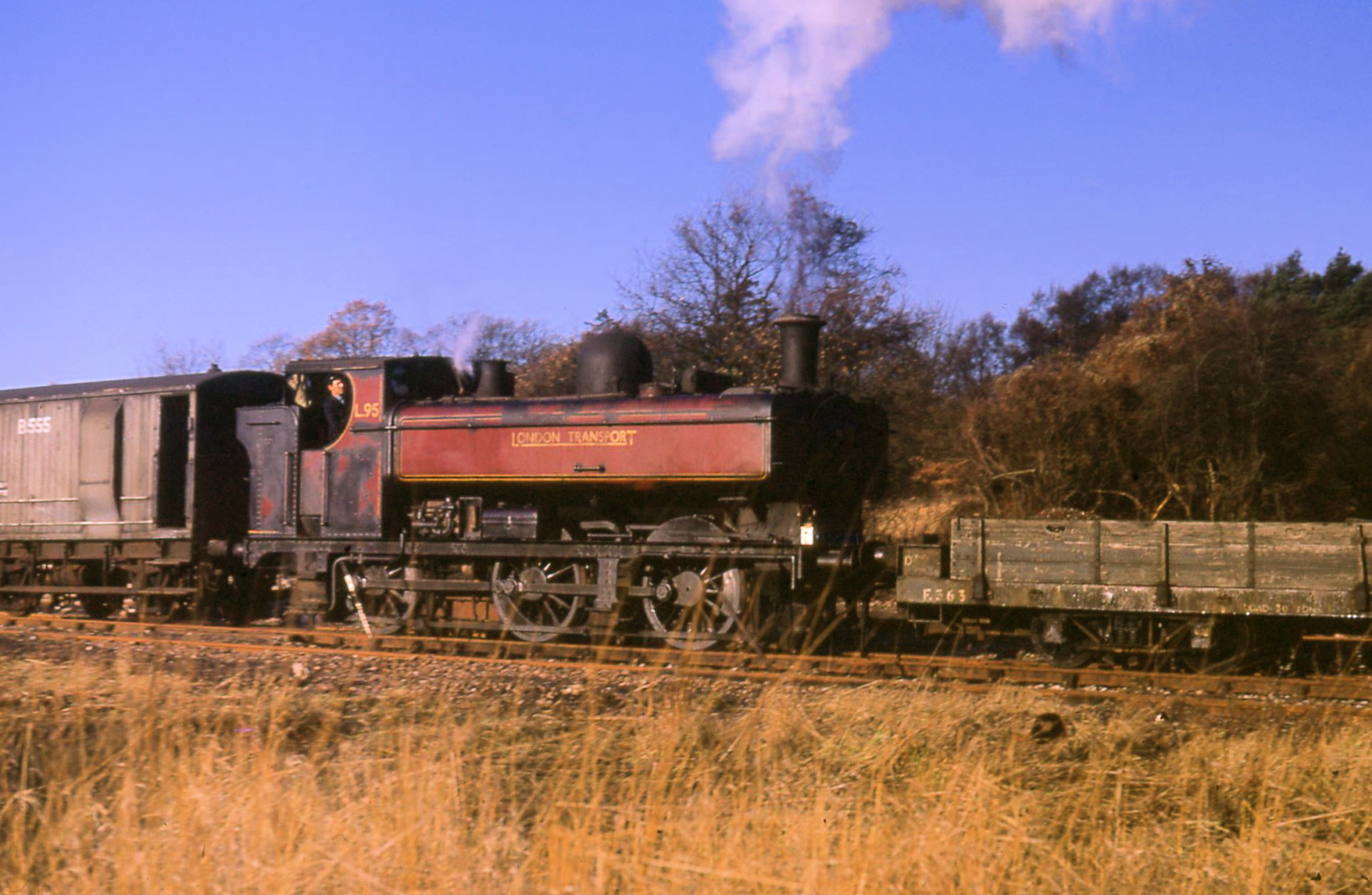
LT No. L95, 40 years old, shunts at Croxley Tip in autumn 1969

Although the London Underground network had been electrified for many years (the then Metropolitan Railway was electrified in 1905) a small number of steam locomotives were retained for engineering and ballast trains. By the 1950s, the locomotives were past their prime and expensive to maintain, and the planned quadrupling of part of the Metropolitan line would require reliable locomotives. London Transport considered replacing the steam fleet with diesel shunters, and had also tested (unsuccessfully) a Great Northern Railway Class J52 locomotive in 1955.

The first 5700 locomotive, No. 7711, underwent trials from January to April 1956, first running between Finchley Road and Baker Street. Modifications were needed to the cab for clearance and the tripcock brake valves after problems were found when running in reverse. Curtains were also fitted to the cab to reduce smoke and fumes in tunnels. In May, the 5700s became the standard for engineering trains on London Transport when they bought No. 7711 (for £3,160), decided to buy another (No. 5752), and planned to buy more over the coming years.

Thirteen 5700s were bought by London Transport (from 1956 to 1963). They were numbered L89 to L99 and were allocated to the depots at Lillie Bridge (Fulham) and Neasden. Only eleven were running at any one time, the original L90 and L91 were withdrawn for repairs but scrapped instead and replaced by other locomotives which carried the same number.

They worked permanent way trains and were never used on normal passenger services. Main line running included trips between depots, to Acton Works and runs out to Croxley Tip, near Watford.

Three of the LT 5700s lasted until the end of steam on London Transport in 1971 and were the last steam locomotives used for regular mainline working in the UK. (Note: Steam locomotives are now often seen on British mainline railways, but only as specials. Ferris also mentions the WT Class 2-6-4Ts operated by Northern Ireland Railways as being amongst the last steam locomotives in regular use, but although withdrawn in 1971, they were last steamed in 1970.) London Transport commemorated the end of operating steam locomotives with a special run from Moorgate station to Neasden depot. The train comprised No. L94 (No. 7752) and a selection of maintenance rolling stock. Three diesel-hydraulic locomotives were bought to carry out the shunting duties from then on.

London Transport 5700s
LT Number	BR No.	Date Built	Date to LT	Withdrawn by LT	Notes
L89	5775	1929	1963	1969	Sold to Keighley & Worth Valley Railway (Note: Moved to the railway in January 1970 and within a few months was used in filming for The Railway Children.)
L90 (I)	7711	1930	1956	1961	Scrapped
L90 (II)	7760	1930	1961	1971	Sold to 7029 Clun Castle Ltd (Note: 7029 Clun Castle Ltd., a registered educational charity, owns the Tyseley Collection (held at Tyseley Locomotive Works). Vintage Trains, a charitable trust (previously known as Birmingham Railway Museum Trust), is the custodian of the Tyseley Collection.)
L91 (I)	5752	1929	1956	1960	Scrapped
L91 (II)	5757	1929	1960	1968	Scrapped
L92	5786	1930	1958	1969	Sold to Worcester Locomotive Society (Note: Now based at the South Devon Railway.)
L93	7779	1930	1958	1968	Scrapped
L94	7752	1930	1959	1971	Sold to 7029 Clun Castle Ltd
L95	5764	1929	1960	1971	Sold to Severn Valley Railway (Note: Three 5700s were bought by the SVR Pannier Tank Fund: No. 5764, No. 7714, and No. 3612 which was bought for spares and not restored.)
L96	7741	1930	1961	1967	Scrapped
L97	7749	1930	1962	1970	Scrapped
L98	7739	1929	1962	1970	Scrapped
L99	7715	1930	1963	1969	Sold to Quainton Railway Society (Note: The Quainton Railway Society now operates as the Buckinghamshire Railway Centre.)

=== National Coal Board ===
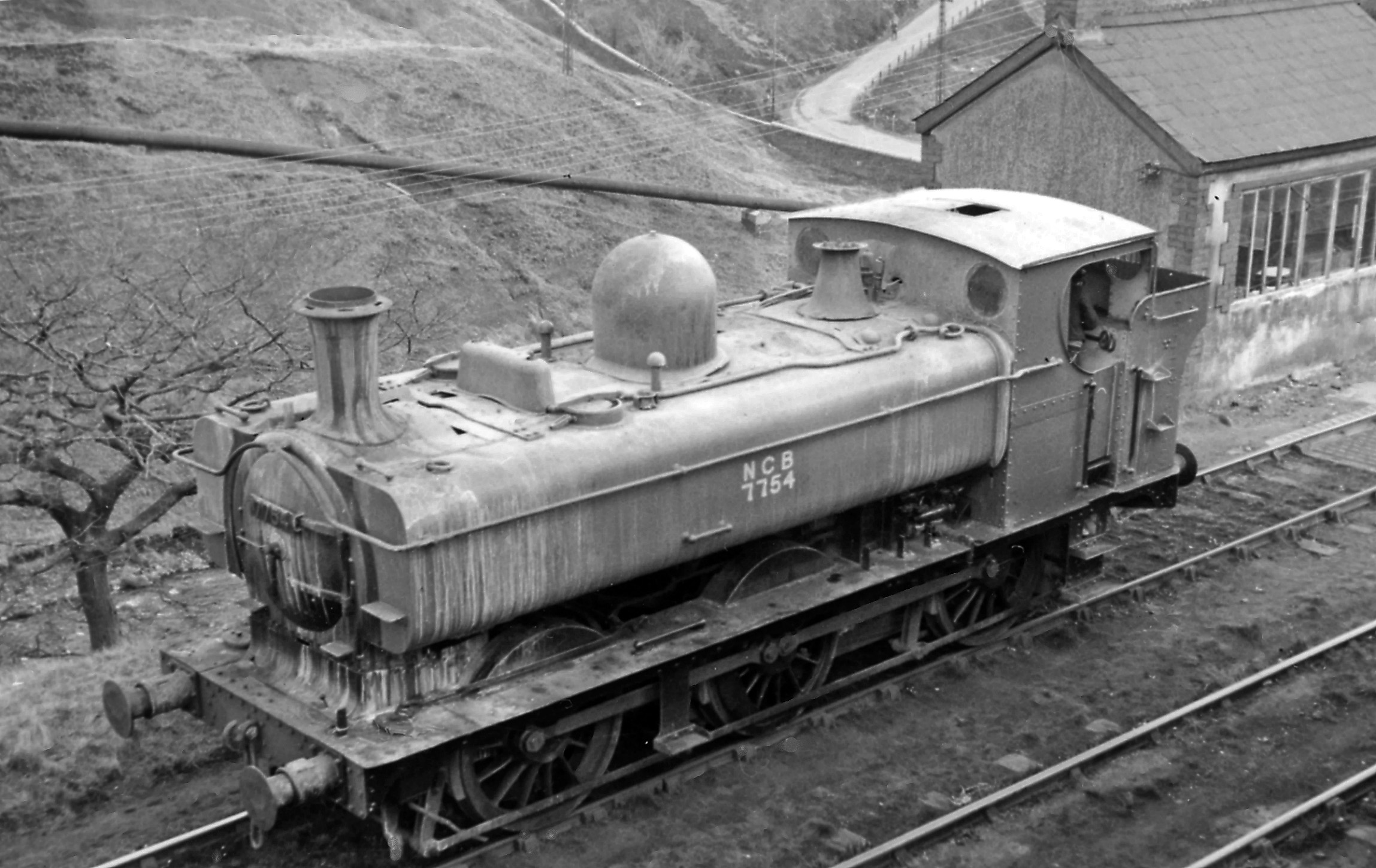
No. 7754 working for the NCB in 1965

Between 1959 and 1965, the National Coal Board (NCB) bought five 5700s from BR for use at pits in South Wales, continuing a tradition of the GWR selling withdrawn pannier tank locomotives to the NCB. The engines retained their BR numbers. The NCB locomotives did not receive maintenance to match GWR standards and were run into the ground, saving the cost of expensive overhauls.

One of the NCB 5700s, No. 7754, was the last in industrial service, and after working at various collieries was moved to Deep Duffryn Colliery at Mountain Ash in 1970, where an ex-GWR fitter kept it working until 1975 when a loose piston resulted in a blown cylinder cover. No. 7754 could still be seen on shed in 1980. The NCB donated No. 7754 to the National Museum Wales, who placed it on permanent loan to the Llangollen Railway. It is now owned by the Llangollen Railway Trust.

NCB 5700s
BR No.	Date Built	Date to NCB	Location	Notes
3663	1940	1962	Nine Mile Point	Scrapped 1966
7714	1930	1959	Penallta	Sold to Severn Valley Railway
7754	1930	1959	Mountain Ash	Donated by NCB to the National Museum Wales
9600	1945	1965	Merthyr Vale	Sold to 7029 Clun Castle Ltd
9792	1936	1964	Maerdy	Scrapped 1973

=== Other uses ===
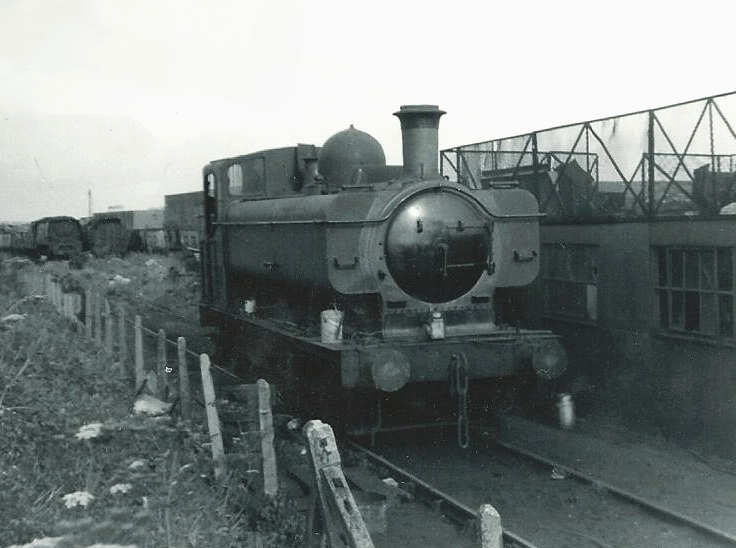
No. 9642 at Hayes scrapyard in 1965

No. 3650 was withdrawn in 1963 and then sold to P.D. Fuels, a division of Stephenson Clarke Ltd., and was used to move spoil to slag heaps at Gwaun-Cae-Gurwen colliery near Ammanford, Carmarthenshire. It was later bought and restored by members of the Great Western Society and became operational in 2009.

No. 9642 was withdrawn in 1964 and sent to Hayes Scrapyard, near Bridgend. Rather than being scrapped, it was used to shunt other locomotives being scrapped. It was due for disposal in 1967, making it the 346th locomotive to be scrapped there, but due to a last minute intervention the locomotive was bought in 1968 and restored by the South Wales Pannier Group, becoming the first member of the class to be preserved. It was moved to Maesteg Colliery, where it gave brake van rides from the late 1960s and throughout the 1970s.

== Preservation ==
Sixteen 5700 class locomotives have been preserved of which one half are from the original 5700 Class and the other half are members of the 8750 sub-class. 11 are Swindon built classmembers with the remaining five being from outside contractors. Of the sixteen engines, five are currently operational. Four of the class have worked mainline trains: 7715, 7752, 7760 and 9600. As of 2020, none of the engines are mainline certified: 7715, 7752, 7760 and 9600 are stored out of service awaiting overhauls. Two locomotives are on static display, and two are in store. Six locomotives are undergoing, or waiting for, maintenance. One locomotive, No. 9629, is being restored, and has not been in steam since it was sent to Barry Scrapyard in 1965.

A number of those bought from London Transport, which had been maintained by British Railways, were still in running order and were used on heritage railways with minimal work. No. 5764 (LT L95) was steamed the day it arrived at Bridgnorth on the Severn Valley Railway, being lit-up before it had been removed from the low-loader on which it was delivered. As of June 2018, Nos. 7752 (LT L94) and 5786 (LT L92) can be seen running in the maroon livery of London Transport, but No. 7715 (LT L99) is currently out of service.

The locomotives that were preserved after NCB and industrial use required rather more work than those acquired from London Transport. Some had been laid up for sometime after being withdrawn, and had received very little, if any, maintenance.

Of the twelve 5700s that went to Barry Scrapyard, five were saved for preservation and one (No. 3612) was bought for spares by the Severn Valley Railway.

5700s in Preservation
No.	Photo	Notes	Year Built	Location Built	Operated/owned by
3650 (8750)	A green pannier tank locomotive, viewed from the left and front, is standing in front of two other locomotives. The locomotive is fitted with a chimney, rounded boiler dome, and a curved safety valve cover. The cab is enclosed with rectangular windows. Although mainly green, the chimney, front, and undercarriage are painted black, except the coupling rods which are grey, and the front buffer beam is painted red. On the side of the pannier tank is a yellow roundel with the letters G W R. On the side of the cab there is a small blue disc and a black number plate with the letters and edging in yellow.	No. 3650 was withdrawn in 1963 and bought by Stephenson Clarke to work in a South Wales colliery. It was later bought by a Great Western Society (GWS) member (Note: No. 3650 is now owned by a group of GWS members, and was restored by a group of volunteers known as The Black Cupboard Gang.) and moved to Hereford. It was then moved to Didcot Railway Centre around 1970 for full restoration and was restored to service in 2008. It was withdrawn in 2016 for overhaul which is in progress.	1939	Swindon Works	Didcot Railway Centre
3738 (8750)	A black pannier tank locomotive, with the letters GWR in yellow on the side, pulls a mixed traffic train. The train includes a blue tank wagon, with "Express Dairy Milk for London" written on the side, and then a passenger carriage painted cream and red.	No. 3738 was withdrawn in 1965 and sent to Barry Scrapyard. It was bought by two GWS members and taken to Didcot Railway Centre in 1974, and restored to full use in 1975. After overhauls it last returned to service in 2007. It was taken out of service in 2013 because of firebox problems and is on static display.	1937	Swindon Works	Didcot Railway Centre
4612 (8750)	A green pannier tank locomotive blowing off steam as it moves backwards.	No. 4612 was withdrawn in 1965, sent to Barry scrapyard, and later bought by the Keighley & Worth Valley Railway (KWVR) in 1981 for spares. It was then bought privately in 1987 and was restored by the Swindon Railway Workshop. (Note: Not to be confused with the Swindon Works. The Swindon Railway Workshop occupied part of the then closed Swindon Works. The business later moved to Lydney, Gloucester, and is now known as The Flour Mill.) After restoration was completed in 2001, No. 4612 was moved to the Bodmin and Wenford Railway which now owns the locomotive, and returned to service in 2013 following a ten-year overhaul.	1942	Swindon Works	Bodmin and Wenford Railway
5764/L95 (5700)	A red pannier tank locomotive, viewed from the front on display inside a railway museum, surrounded by other locomotives.	No. 5764 was sold to London Transport (LT) in 1960 and renumbered L95. It was sold to the Severn Valley Railway in 1971, and was operational less than a month after last being used on LT. It was last used on New Year's Eve 2010, and as of May 2024 is on display in The Engine House in LT livery.	1929	Swindon Works	Severn Valley Railway
5775/L89 (5700)		No. 5775 was sold to LT in 1958 and renumbered L89. It was sold to the KWVR in 1970 and soon appeared in the film The Railway Children in the brown livery of the fictional Great North & South Railway (GN&SR). No. 5775 went to Locomotion, the National Railway Museum at Shildon in May 2014 to be repainted in the livery used in the film for an exhibition, and returned to the KWVR in time for a celebration of the making of the film in May 2015. Currently, the loco is on display in the exhibition shed at Oxenhope station pending a further overhaul.	1929	Swindon Works	Keighley and Worth Valley Railway
5786/L92 (5700)	A black pannier tank locomotive is travelling from right to left, bunker first, along a single track on the side of a wooded hill. The locomotive is pulling five passenger carriages painted cream and brown, and a plume of smoke is passing over the first two carriages. The image of the train is reflected the river in front of the train.	No. 5786 was sold to LT in 1958 and renumbered L92. It was sold to the Worcester Locomotive Society in 1969 and was based at Bulmers Railway Centre until 1993. Since then it has been on loan to the South Devon Railway. It returned to service in 2013 in the maroon livery of LT. 5786's boiler ticket expired on 31 May 2023, it is currently undergoing a 10-year overhaul.	1930	Swindon Works	South Devon Railway
7714 (5700)	A green pannier tank locomotive is seen from above and to the front as it waits at a station with two railway tracks and platform. The platform on the left includes a small wooden shelter, benches, lamps, flowers, and, near the end of the platform, three milk churns positioning across the platform to prevent people passing. The platform on the right, where the train is waiting, includes a brick building, more flowers, and again, three milk churns arranged to stop people passing. There is also a signal near the locomotive, and its black and white semaphore arm is pointing downward. The train includes seven coaches in maroon. A plume of grey smoke comes from the locomotive chimney, and a smaller plume of white steam from the safety valve near the cab.	No. 7714 was withdrawn in 1959 and sold to the National Coal Board (NCB). It was bought by SVR in 1973 and was first steamed in 1992 after an extensive overhaul. Withdrawn from service in 2009, the engine re-entered service after overhaul in late November 2016. It currently wears the BR Unlined Black livery. It is the only survivor of the class in preservation to retain a backhead feed boiler.	1930	Kerr Stuart	Severn Valley Railway
7715/L99 (5700)	A pannier tank locomotive is standing at a platform, leading a train which includes a second locomotive and one visible passenger carriage. The pannier tanker is maroon, apart from the black chimney and red coupling rods and buffer beam. The tank, cab, steps, splashers and toolbox are all lined in yellow. London Transport is written on the side of the tank, and L.99 on the side of the cab, again in yellow. The second, larger, locomotive is green with a brass safety valve cover, a name plate over one of the wheels, and has a tender behind it.	No. 7715 was sold to LT in 1959 and renumbered L99. It was bought by the London Railway Preservation Society in 1968 and was later certified for mainline operation on British Rail. No. 7715 has worked specials on LT and has been loaned to other heritage railways and operators, but was withdrawn from service because of a cracked boiler foundation ring. It returned to Quainton (Note: Quainton is the headquarters and workshop of the Buckinghamshire Railway Centre.) in May 2014 and is awaiting the necessary repairs to return it to service.	1930	Kerr Stuart	Buckinghamshire Railway Centre
7752/L94 (5700)	A pannier tank locomotive is passing a station platform, running round its train which includes rolling stock visible in the background. The pannier tanker is green, apart from the black chimney, brass safety valve cover, red buffer beam, and grey coupling rods. Great Western is written on the side of the tank, and 7752 on a number plate on the cab	No. 7752 was sold to LT in 1959 and renumbered L94. In 1971 No. 7752 hauled the last steam train on the London Underground. It was immediately bought by 7029 Clun Castle Ltd., and is certified for mainline operation. It has visited various heritage railways and was outshopped in LT livery in 2011 to celebrate the fortieth anniversary of the last run on London Underground., Locomotive is to be repainted back to GWR Green with 'GREAT WESTERN' lettering at Minehead during loan to the WSR for the 2019 season	1930	NBL Glasgow	Vintage Trains, Tyseley
7754 (5700)	A pannier tank locomotive is seen from the front a slightly to the right. The cab and pannier tank are painted green. The chimney, smokebox, running plate, splashers, and wheels are black, and the buffer beam and coupling rods are red. The number, 7754, is shown in white letters on a black plate on the smokebox door. Part of round cab window is visible and is edged in brass. The white lettering "NCB 7754" is on the side of the pannier tank.	No. 7754 was withdrawn in 1959 and sold to National Coal Board (NCB) and worked at various collieries until 1975, becoming the last 5700 in "real", rather than "heritage", service. The NCB were persuaded to donate the locomotive to National Museum Wales who loaned it to Llangollen Railway, which now owns the locomotive. After a long and expensive overhaul, and the addition of parts from No. 3612 which was held for spares by the SVR, it moved under its own power in 1993. After many years in service No. 7754 is currently out of traffic undergoing overhaul. Following completion of an extensive overhaul in Llangollen engine shed, 7754 returned to service in September 2023 wearing Transitional livery (Great Western Green with British Railways lettering in GWR Egyptian font).	1930	NBL Glasgow	Llangollen Railway
7760/L90 (5700)	Two pannier tank locomotives are seen from the front and to the right and are standing next to each other in front of a turntable. Both locomotives have black chimneys and fronts. The cabs, pannier tanks, clackbox covers and boiler domes are all green. The buffer beams are red and include the locomotive number in yellow with black edging, 7752 on the left locomotive and 7760 on the right. On the right locomotive, one round cab window is visible and is edged in brass.	No. 7760 was sold to LT in 1961, renumbered L90 (replacing No. 7711 which was scrapped), and then sold to 7029 Clun Castle Ltd in 1971 in full working order. It has been loaned to various heritage railways and was certified for mainline operation in 2000. As of January 2024 No. 7760 is out of service awaiting an overhaul. Vintage Trains announced in January 2024 that as their intention was to focus primarily on sister engines 7752 and 9600 for operational use and future mainline running, 7760 alongside select additional steam engines which didn't fit in with their future development plans were to be sold to new owners. The locomotive has since been sold to a private buyer and left Tyseley.	1930	NBL Glasgow	
9600 (8750)	A pannier tank locomotive is seen from the front and to the right and is standing over an ash pit. It is all in black apart from a number of small details. The buffer beam at the front is red. The locomotive number, 9600, is shown in white on a plate on the smokebox door and on a larger plate, edged in white, on the side of the cab. There is a small yellow disc, with the letter C above the number plate. The shed number, 84 E, is shown in white on a small plate near the bottom of the smokebox door. The pannier tank and cab side are lined in red and white, and the British Railways crest, in yellow, white and red, is on the side of the pannier. The letters T Y S are shown in white on the running plate step near the front. The coupling rods are unpainted and are steel grey. Finally, two white lamps are stored next to the black toolbox near the back of the running plate.	No. 9600 was withdrawn in 1965 and sold to NCB and was in service at Merthyr Vale colliery until 1973. It was then sold to 7029 Clun Castle Ltd and its overhaul was completed in 1997. No. 9600 was certified for mainline operation in 1999, re-certified in 2009, and has regularly worked excursion trains. Boiler ticket expired in 2018 and is awaiting overhaul.	1945	Swindon Works	Vintage Trains, Tyseley
9629 (8750)	A green pannier tank locomotive stands on a short length of track on a gravel bed surrounded by grass. In the background is a brick building. The letters G W R are shown on the side of the pannier tank. A small box stands near the cab and is pointing to the wheels.	No. 9629 was withdrawn in 1964 and sent to Barry scrapyard in 1965. In 1981 went to Steamtown, Carnforth for a five-year cosmetic restoration before being on static display outside the Holiday Inn, Cardiff for nine years. The owners donated it to the Pontypool & Blaenavon Locomotive Group in 1995. No. 9629 is now undergoing restoration at Pontypool and Blaenavon Railway, and its original boiler was acquired in 2012.	1945	Swindon Works	Pontypool & Blaenavon Locomotive Group
9642 (8750)	A black pannier tank locomotive is waiting at a platform with a train of two cream and brown passenger carriages. In the background is a green wooded hill, and a small wooden station building with a slate roof. The station master is sheltering from the rain in the doorway of the building. Smoke and steam are coming from the locomotive as it prepares to move off.	No. 9642 was withdrawn in 1964 and sent to Hayes Scrapyard, but was used to shunt other locomotives, and was saved by the South Wales Pannier Group in 1968 and was steamed in 1969. It was later moved to the Swansea Valley Railway Society, and then the Dean Forest Railway in 1994. In 2005 No. 9642 was bought privately for use on the Gloucestershire Warwickshire Railway. It was soon removed for overhaul and will return to operation when restoration is complete.	1946	Swindon Works	Gloucestershire Warwickshire Railway
9681 (8750)	A black pannier tank locomotive is passing along a single track through woodland. The locomotive is pulling a train of a covered red wagon, three grey open wagons, and a red guard's van.	No. 9681 was withdrawn and sent to Barry scrapyard in 1965. It was taken to the Dean Forest Railway in 1975 and returned to steam in 1984. It was taken out of service in 2013 for overhaul, which is currently progressing at Norchard.	1949	Swindon Works	Dean Forest Railway
9682 (8750)	A black pannier tank locomotive is standing at the platform of a small rural railway station with a brick and slate building, cream wooden fencing, and lamp. The driver is standing next to the locomotive and is talking to a group of passengers who are about to board the red passenger carriage.	No. 9682 was withdrawn in 1965 and sent to Barry scrapyard. It was bought by the GWR Preservation Group in 1982 and, after overhaul, returned to traffic in 2000. It has since been loaned to various heritage railways, most recently the Chinnor and Princes Risborough Railway. It was taken out of service in 2009 and returned to Southall for overhaul.	1949	Swindon Works	Dean Forest Railway

== Liveries ==
The GWR 5700 class locomotives have been in a number of liveries throughout preservation and their working lives.

Livery	Image	Notes
GWR Shirt-button		
GWR		
Great Western		
GWR wartime black		
BR unlined black (early emblem)		
BR unlined black (late crest)		
BR lined black (early emblem)		
London Transport		
Great Northern & Southern Railway		Repainted in a fictional livery for The Railway Children
National Coal Board		

== In fiction ==
No. 5775 on the Keighley and Worth Valley Railway featured in the film The Railway Children painted brown and lettered with GN&SR (Great Northern and Southern Railway). In May 2014, No. 5775 was moved to National Railway Museum Shildon, for cosmetic restoration back to the livery used in the film.

The character Duck in The Railway Series books and the TV series Thomas the Tank Engine and Friends is a class 5700 pannier tank. In the books, his number was 5741. The real 5741 was withdrawn on 30 June 1957 and scrapped on 31 May 1958.

No. 5764 appeared several times in the 1976 BBC television adaptation of Charles Dickens' short ghost story, The Signal-Man.

== Model railways ==
Mainline Railways had OO gauge Class 5700 models in their catalogue in 1982–3, with models in GWR green and BR black. Hornby produced various OO gauge models of the 8750 class in GWR and LT liveries.

Dapol since their merger with Lionheart Models in August 2016 has produced several versions of the 57xx class and 87xx subclass in O gauge since 2018. Minerva models has also released 0 gauge models of the 57xx in Great Western and British railway liveries.

== See also ==
- GWR 0-6-0PT – list of classes of GWR 0-6-0 pannier tank, including table of preserved locomotives
- LMS Fowler Class 3F – the London, Midland and Scottish Railway's standard shunter
- LNER Class J50 – the London and North Eastern Railway's standard shunter
- Hunslet Austerity 0-6-0ST – the War Department's standard shunter
- British Rail Class 08 – BR's standard shunter in the 1950s and 1960s
