= GWR 5400 Class =

Class of 25 two-cylinder locomotives

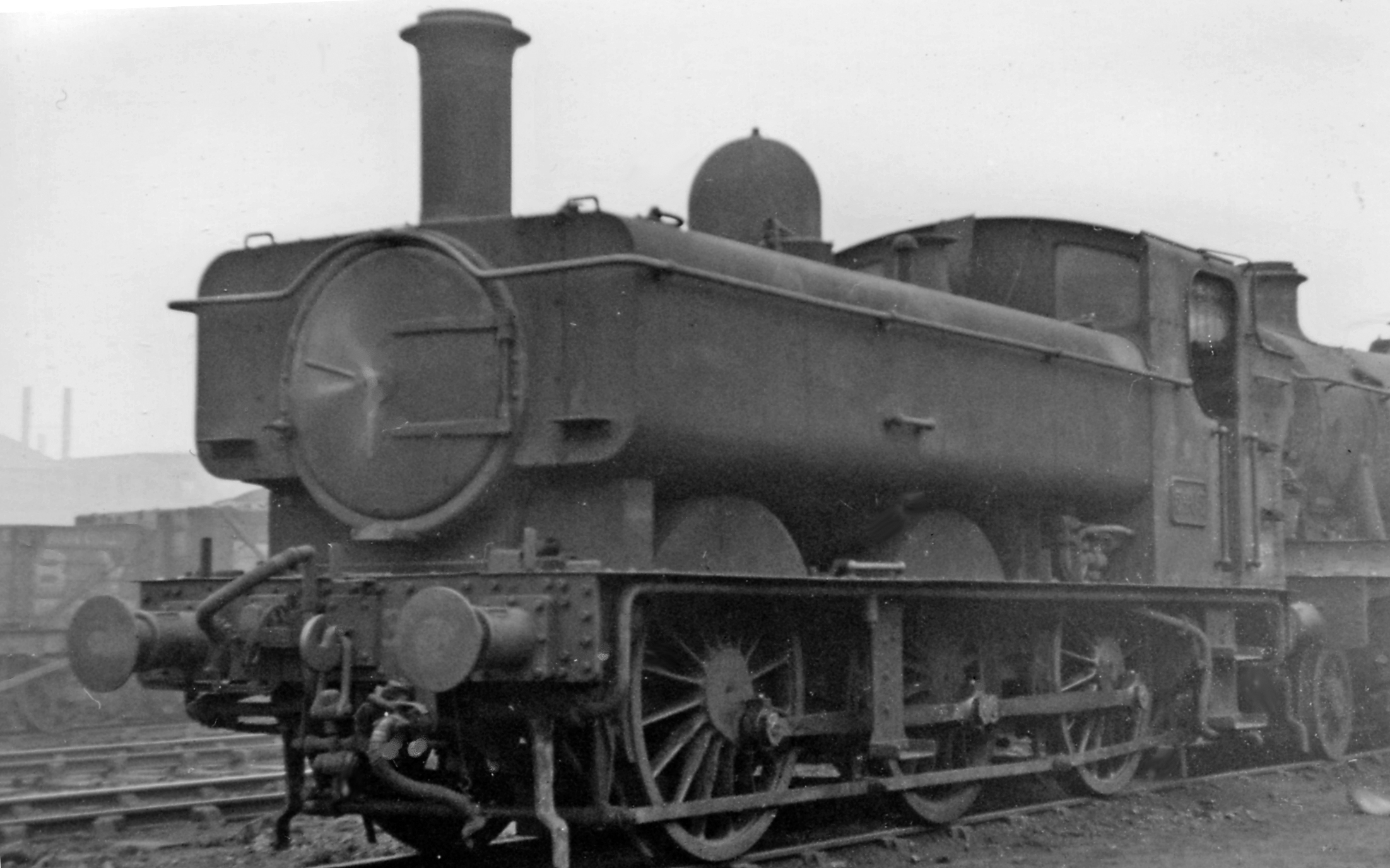
- 5405 at Old Oak Common TMD in 1947
Type and origin
- Power type: Steam
- Designer: Charles Collett
- Builder: GWR Swindon Works
- Order number: Lots 277 (part), 301
- Build date: 1930–1932, 1935
- Total produced: 25
Specifications
- Configuration
  - Whyte: 0-6-0PT
- Gauge: 4 ft 8 1/2 in (1,435 mm) standard gauge
- Driver dia.: 5 ft 2 in (1.575 m)
- Minimum curve: 4 chains (264 ft; 80 m) normal; 3.5 chains (231 ft; 70 m) slow
- Wheelbase: 14 ft 8 in (4.47 m)
- Length: Over buffers: 31 ft 1 in (9.47 m)
- Width: 8 ft 7 in (2.616 m)
- Height: 12 ft 6 3/16 in (3.815 m)
- Frame type: Type: Inside; Length: 26 ft 5 in (8.05 m)
- Axle load: 15 long tons 12 cwt (34,900 lb or 15.9 t) (17.5 short tons)
- Loco weight: 46 long tons 12 cwt (104,400 lb or 47.3 t) (52.2 short tons) full
- Fuel type: Coal
- Fuel capacity: 3 long tons 4 cwt (7,200 lb or 3.3 t) (3.6 short tons)
- Water cap.: 1,100 imp gal (5,000 L; 1,300 US gal)
- Firebox
  - Grate area: 16.76 sq ft (1.557 m^{2})
- Boiler
  - Model: GWR Standard No. 21
  - Pitch: 7 ft 0 in (2.13 m)
  - Diameter: Outside diameter: 4 ft 3 in (1.30 m) & 4 ft 2 1/8 in (1.273 m)
  - Tube plates: Barrel: 10 ft 6 in (3.20 m)
- Boiler pressure: 165 psi (1.14 MPa)
- Heating surface
  - Firebox: 81.8 sq ft (7.60 m^{2})
  - Tubes: 1,004.2 sq ft (93.29 m^{2})
  - Total surface: 1,086.0 sq ft (100.89 m^{2})
- Cylinders: two inside
- Cylinder size: 16 1/2 in × 24 in (419 mm × 610 mm)
- Train heating: Steam from locomotive boiler
- Loco brake: steam
- Train brakes: vacuum
- Safety systems: ATC
Performance figures
- Tractive effort: 14,780 lbf (65.7 kN)
Career
- Operators: Great Western Railway • British Railways
- Power class: GWR: Ungrouped; BR: 1P
- Numbers: 5400–5424
- Axle load class: GWR: Yellow
- Locale: Western Region
- Withdrawn: 1956–1963
- Disposition: All scrapped

The Great Western Railway (GWR) 5400 Class was a class of 0-6-0 pannier tank steam locomotive. They were similar in appearance to many other GWR tank engines but smaller than the ubiquitous GWR 5700 Class.

The nominally Collett-designed 5400 Class had 5 ft 2 in (1.575 m) driving wheels for greater top speed with autocoaches, and were all fitted with the required remote control gear for working the push-pull autotrains. They had a modern cab and a larger bunker. They were frequently seen on inner suburban routes from Paddington.

== History ==
The 5400 class was related to the GWR 2021 Class saddle tank, designed by William Dean and built at Wolverhampton railway works. This was a light, compact design with 4 ft 1 1/2 in (1.257 m) wheels, itself derived from the smaller Armstrong GWR 850 Class dating from 1874.

The prototype was not a new engine, being rebuilt from 2021 Class No. 2062 in 1930. It was given larger wheels, splashers and coal bunker, and the new units from 1931 onwards had the rounded-edge cab as well. This cab style was to be fitted to all subsequent GWR pannier tank designs, including the later derivations of the 5700 Class.

Despite its success, the prototype, No. 5400, had a short life, lasting only two years before being scrapped. It was used as a parts donor for an all-new engine with the same number. 25 locomotives were built and they were numbered 5400–5424.

Table of orders and numbers
| Year | Quantity | Lot No. | Locomotive numbers | Notes |
|---|---|---|---|---|
| 1930–32 | 20 | 277 | 5400–5419 | |
| 1935 | 5 | 301 | 5420–5424 | |

== Withdrawal and mileages ==
Withdrawal from service with BR started in 1957 and was completed in 1963. The last ones in service were No. 5410, No. 5416, and No. 5420.

Withdrawal of 5400s from BR
| Year | 1956 | 1957 | 1958 | 1959 | 1960 | 1961 | 1962 | 1963 |
| Numbers | 1 | 7 | 3 | 5 | 3 | 1 | 2 | 3 |

le Fleming noted that the mileages of those withdrawn between February 1957 and February 1958 were "from 671,000 to 775,000".

== GWR 6400 and 7400 classes ==
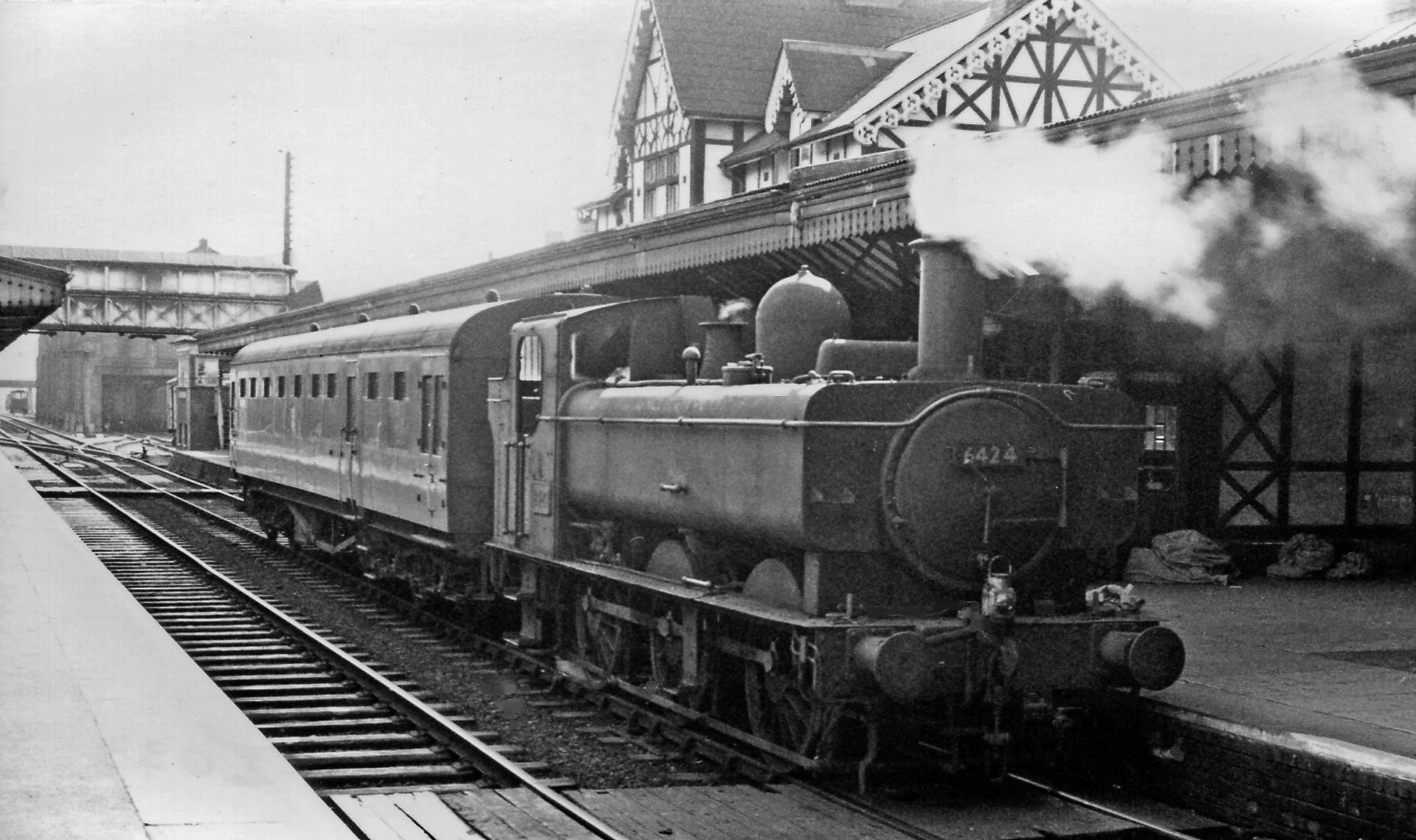
6400 Class locomotive 6424 at Kidderminster in 1963

The GWR 6400 Class and 7400 Class that followed were closely related, fundamentally differing only in wheel size – 4 ft 7 1/2 in (1.410 m) – and, in the case of the 74xx, a higher boiler pressure of 180 psi (1.2 MPa). This produced two general purpose classes with wide route availability. The 6400 was auto-fitted but more suitable for hilly routes than the 5400. The 7400 was not auto-fitted.

== See also ==
- GWR 0-6-0PT – list of classes of GWR 0-6-0 pannier tank, including table of preserved locomotives

== Sources ==
- Allcock, N. J.; Davies, F. K.; le Fleming, H. M.; Maskelyne, J. N.; Reed, P. J. T.; Tabor, F. J. (1968) [1951]. White, D. E. (ed.). The Locomotives of the Great Western Railway, part one: Preliminary Survey. Kenilworth: RCTS.
- Champ, Jim (2018). An Introduction to Great Western Locomotive Development. Barnsley: Pen & Sword Transport. ISBN 978-1-4738-7784-9. OCLC 1029234106. OL 26953051M.
- le Fleming, H. M. (April 1958). White, D. E. (ed.). The Locomotives of the Great Western Railway, part five: Six-coupled Tank Engines. RCTS. ISBN 0-901115-35-5. OCLC 500544510.
- Whitehurst, Brian (1973). Great Western Engines, Names, Numbers, Types and Classes (1940 to Preservation). Oxford, UK: Oxford Publishing Company. ISBN 978-0-9028-8821-0. OCLC 815661.
