= GWR 6400 Class =

Great Western Railway steam locomotive class

GWR 6400 and 7400 Classes
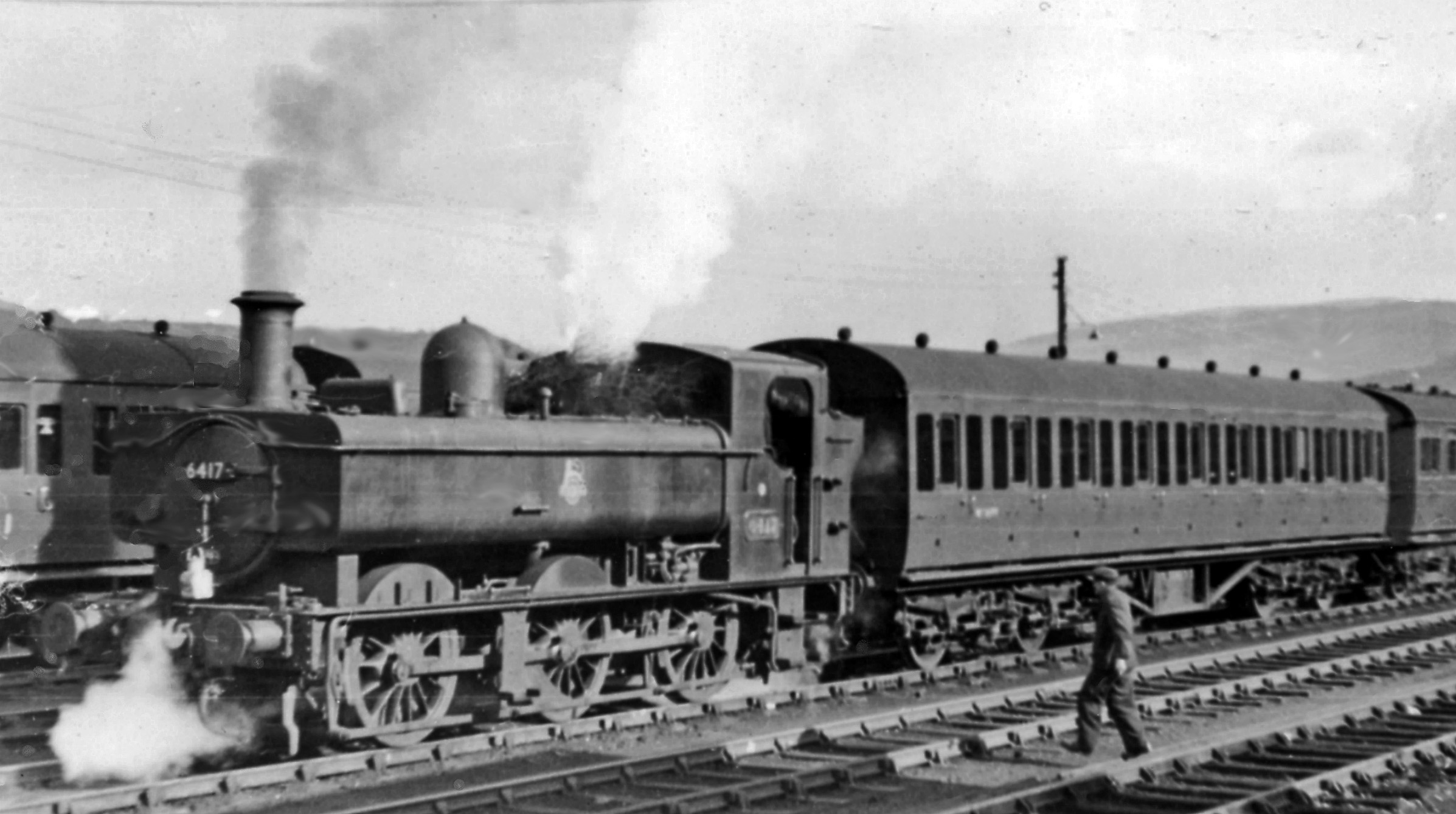
- 6417 at Aberdare (Low Level) in 1954
Type and origin
- Power type: Steam
- Designer: Charles Collett
- Builder: GWR/BR Swindon Works
- Order number: 6400: Lots 277 (part), 294, 300, 305; 7400: 307, 371, 380
- Build date: 6400: 1932 (40); 7400: 1936 (30), 1948 (10), 1950 (10)
- Total produced: 6400: 40; 7400: 50
Specifications
- Configuration
  - Whyte: 0-6-0PT
- Gauge: 4 ft 8 1/2 in (1,435 mm) standard gauge
- Driver dia.: 4 ft 7 1/2 in (1.410 m)
- Length: 31 ft 1 in (9.474 m)
- Width: 8 ft 7 in (2.616 m)
- Height: 12 ft 2 15/16 in (3.732 m)
- Loco weight: 6400: 45.6 long tons (46.3 t; 51.1 short tons); 7400: 45.45 long tons (46.18 t; 50.90 short tons)
- Fuel type: Coal
- Fuel capacity: 3 long tons 18 cwt (8,700 lb or 4 t) (3.2 short tons)
- Water cap.: 1,100 imp gal (5,000 L; 1,300 US gal)
- Firebox
  - Grate area: 16.76 sq ft (1.557 m^{2})
- Boiler: GWR Standard No. 21
- Boiler pressure: 6400: 165 psi (1.14 MPa); 7400: 180 psi (1.2 MPa)
- Cylinders: two inside
- Cylinder size: 16 1/2 in × 24 in (419 mm × 610 mm)
- Valve gear: Stephenson
- Valve type: piston valves
Performance figures
- Tractive effort: 6400: 16,510 lbf (73.4 kN); 7400: 18,010 lbf (80.1 kN)
Career
- Operators: Great Western Railway • British Railways
- Class: GWR 6400 and 7400
- Power class: 6400: BR 2P; 7400: BR 2F
- Numbers: 6400: 6400-6439; 7400: 7400-7449
- Locale: Western Region
- Withdrawn: 1958–1965
- Disposition: Three 6400s preserved, remainder scrapped. All 7400 locomotives scrapped.

The Great Western Railway (GWR) 6400 Class is a class of 0-6-0PT type steam locomotives introduced by Charles Collett in 1932. All 40 examples were 'auto-fitted' – equipped with the remote-control equipment needed for working autotrains.

The 1936 GWR 7400 Class was a similar class, without the autotrain apparatus, but with a higher boiler pressure of 180 psi, providing a small but useful increase in power. An initial build of 30 in 1936-1937 was added to by British Railways in two batches each of ten locos in 1948 and 1950. These were destined for a short life, the briefest being only nine years. A minor visual difference between the 5400 and earlier 6400, and the later series of 6400, with the 7400 classes was at the join between cab and bunker. The 5400 and early 6400 had an arc whereas the later 6400 and the 7400 class was straight. The early locos also had a lip at the leading edge of the cab roof, whereas the later locos had a plain corner edge.

Both classes were closely related to the 1930 GWR 5400 Class, which was in turn an evolution of both the Armstrong 1874 GWR 850 Class and the Dean 1891 GWR 2021 Class. Thus the basic design was almost sixty years old when new, the 4 ft 7 1/2 in (1.410 m) driving wheels being the main distinguishing factor, apart from the more modern profile. There were also superficial similarities with the GWR 645 Class as extant in the 1930s, that also had 4 ft 7 1/2 in (1.410 m) wheels and 24 in (610 mm) stroke cylinders (and by then pannier tanks and full cabs).

Table of orders and numbers
Year	Quantity	Lot No.	Locomotive numbers	Notes
1932	10	277	6400–6409	
1934–35	15	294	6410–6424	
1935	5	300	6425–6429	
1937	10	305	6430–6439	
1936–37	30	307	7400–7429	
1948	10	371	7430–7439	
1950	10	380	7440–7449	

== Operations ==
The smaller wheels of the 6400s permitted operation in hillier locations than the 5400 Class and allocations were initially to the South Wales valleys.

Engines of class 6400 worked on many of the ex-GWR branch lines in Devon and around Plymouth until the early 1960s, when the lines closed or diesel multiple units took over services. No. 6430 was a regular engine on the old Tavistock South branch line and would often run with two autocoaches. No. 6412 was allocated at Gloucester Horton Rd loco shed (85B) and operated one of the last 'Chalford Railcar' autotrain services between Gloucester and Chalford on 31 October 1964.

Being allocated to Plymouth Laira the type was trialled on the former Lostwithiel and Fowey Railway, although a 1400 Class 0-4-2 engine was normally used.

== Withdrawal ==
The below list shows when all of the original 6400s and later 7400s were withdrawn from service. The members of the GWR 6400 Class and the GWR 7400 Class were No. 6419 and No. 7439 respectively.

Table of withdrawals
Year	Quantity in service at start of year	Quantity withdrawn	Cumulative quantity withdrawn	Locomotive numbers
1958	90	3	3	6407/23/27
1959	87	16	19	6402/04–05/09/14/17/20/28/32, 7401/11/15–16/20/38/47
1960	71	5	24	6401/06/39, 7400/19
1961	66	11	35	6411/13/15/25–26, 7409–10/17/21/29/33
1962	55	15	50	6408/10/18/22/29/36/38, 7402/06/08/22/25/28/34/40
1963	40	15	65	6403/16/21/31/33/37, 7405/07/12/26/30/41–42/48–49
1964	25	23	88	6400/12/19/24/30/34–35, 7403–04/13–14/18/23–24/27/31–32/35–36/43–46
1965	2	2	90	7437/39

== Preservation ==
Three of the 6400 Class have survived to preservation:

Number	Built	Withdrawn	Service Life	Location	Owners	Livery	Condition	Photograph	Notes
6412	Nov 1934	Nov 1964	30 Years	South Devon Railway	South Devon Railway	BR Lined Green, Late Crest	Operational, Boiler Ticket Expires: 2024		Starred in the TV series The Flockton Flyer
6430	Mar 1937	Oct 1964	27 Years, 7 months	South Devon Railway	Hugh Skipton	BR Lined Green, Early Emblem	Operational, Boiler Ticket Expires: 2025		One of the few engines to escape Cashmore's scrapyard thanks to a last minute rescue by the Dart Valley Railway. Originally purchased as a source of spares for No. 6412 and No. 6435, the locomotive was eventually restored to working order in 2003.
6435	Apr 1937	Oct 1964	27 Years, 5 months	West Somerset Railway	Jon Jones-Pratt	BR Lined Green, Late Crest	Stored, Boiler Ticket Expired: 2022		Briefly named Ajax during the early and mid-2000s. Changed ownership from Bodmin and Wenford Railway in January 2024 with plans for a return to service. Will later be based at West Somerset Railway. Last ran in 2022 following expiry of its boiler ticket.

== See also ==
- GWR 0-6-0PT – list of classes of GWR 0-6-0 pannier tank, including table of preserved locomotives
