= Great Western Railway Power and Weight Classification =

Mark on locomotives indicating capabilities

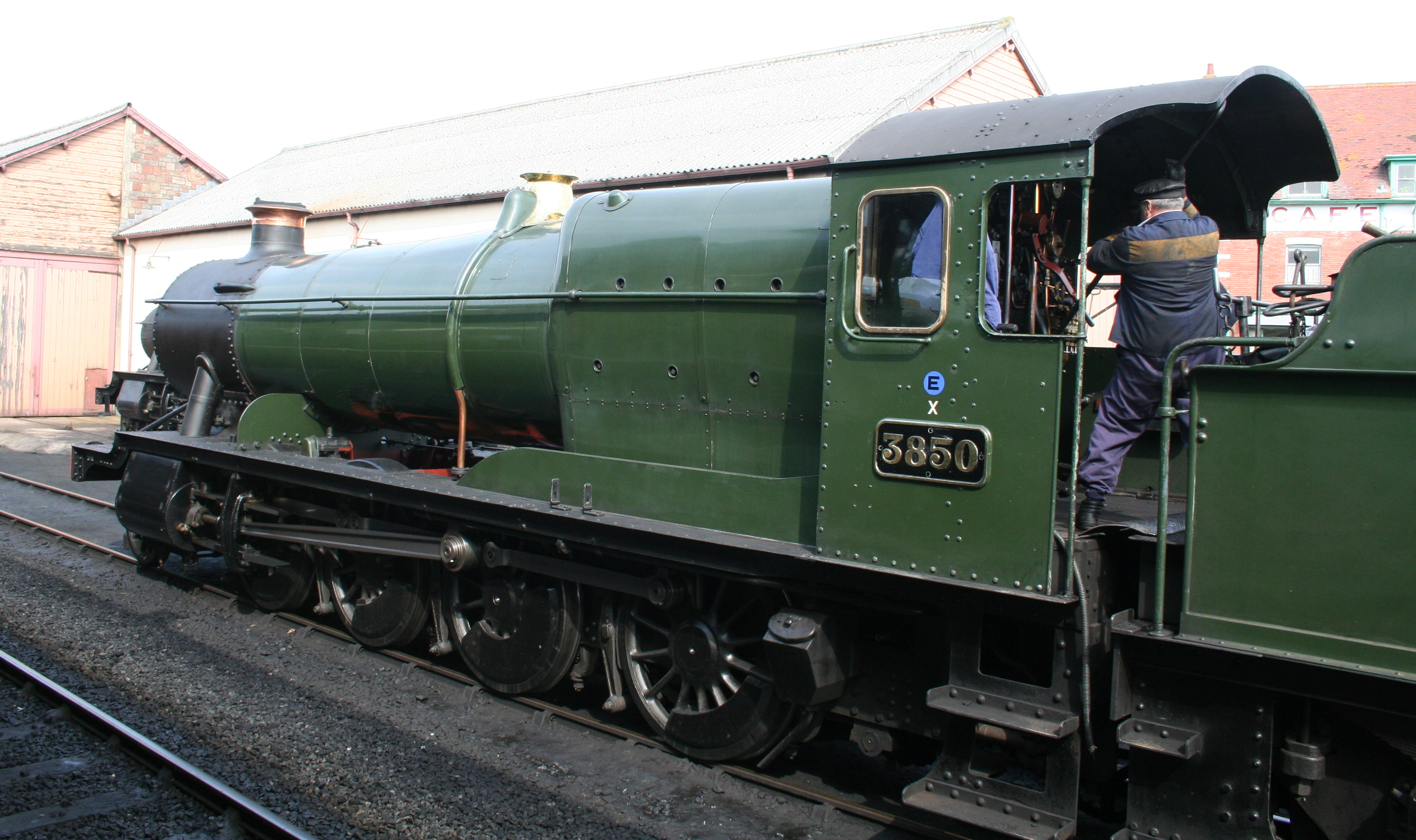
A preserved GWR 2884 Class steam locomotive, showing the power classification as a black letter "E" on a blue weight classification disc, painted above the numberplate. Between the disc and numberplate may be seen a white letter "X", which affects how the power class is interpreted

From 1920, the cab side of Great Western Railway (GWR) steam locomotives bore a letter on a coloured disc, which enabled staff to quickly assess the capabilities of locomotives without the need to check tables of data. The letter showed the power classification, and the coloured disc showed the weight restriction. This system continued after the GWR became the Western Region of British Railways.

== History ==
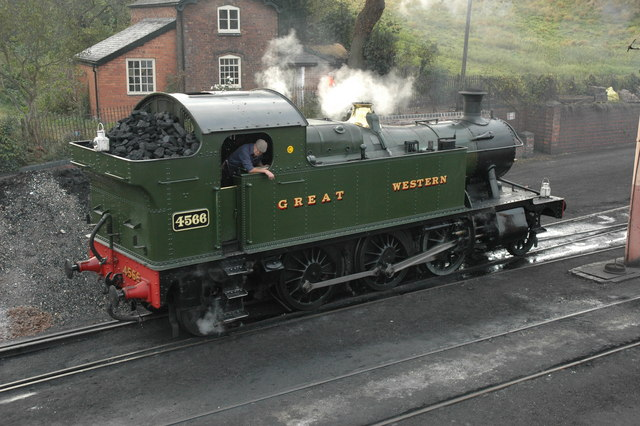
A preserved GWR 4500 Class steam locomotive, showing power classification "C" on a yellow route restriction disc, on the upper cab side-sheet

On 1 July 1905 the Great Western Railway (GWR) introduced a system for denoting both the haulage capabilities and the weight restrictions which applied to their various classes of locomotive. Originally this was used only in record books, but from mid 1919 began to be shown on the locomotives themselves. The weight restriction was shown in the form of a coloured disc, and the power classification was denoted by a capital letter placed upon the disc. At first these were painted high on the cab side, but during World War II the blackout precautions meant that staff had to be careful using lights at night, so the disc and letter were moved downwards to a position just above the engine number plate, to make them easier to see.

When locomotives were loaned by other railways to the GWR during World War II, these were also allotted GWR power and weight classifications, so that GWR staff responsible for locomotive rostering could select the most suitable engine for the task without needing to learn an unfamiliar system.

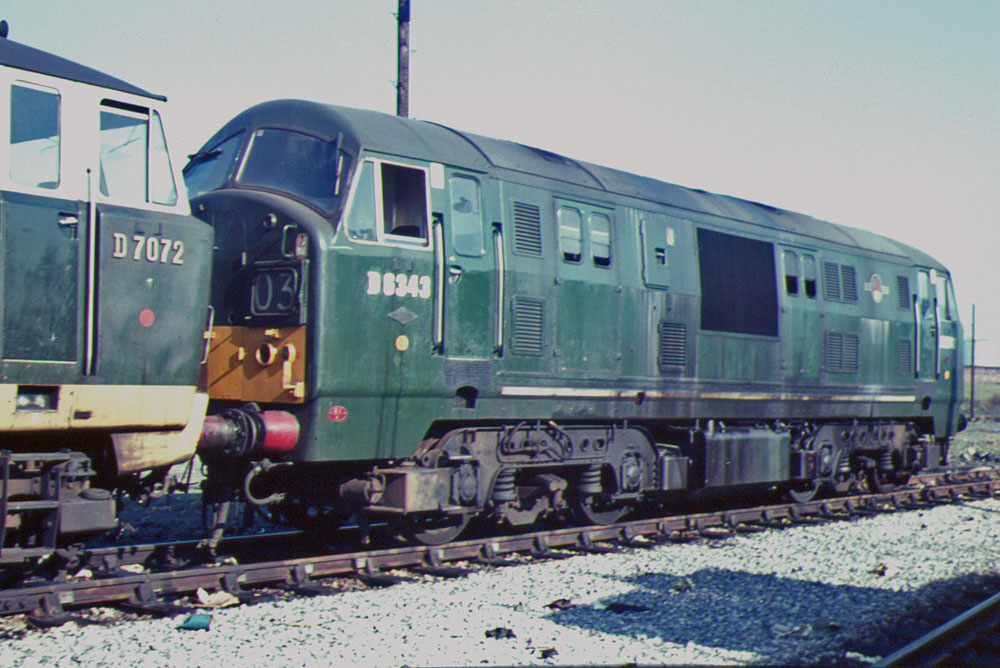
Two Western Region Diesel-hydraulic locomotives; D7072 (left) is a class 35 showing a red route restriction disc; D6343 (right) is a class 22 and has a yellow disc. Both discs are on the cabsides, below the numbers.

The GWR was nationalised in 1948, becoming the Western Region of British Railways. In 1949, BR decided to adopt the London, Midland and Scottish Railway (LMS) system of power classification for all locomotives. Despite this, the use of a letter to denote power classification continued to be used on former GWR steam locomotives, as did the coloured disc for weight classification; both continued until the end of steam traction on the Western Region in 1965. Certain ex-LMS and BR Standard steam locomotives allocated to the Western Region were given GWR style route classification discs, usually without the power class letter. Some of these had the BR power class shown on the disc as a figure; for example, the Class 5 4-6-0 bore the figure "5" on a red disc. The coloured disc was also applied to some diesel locomotives allocated to the Western Region.

== Description ==
=== Power classification ===
The letter represents the power of the locomotive, and is approximately proportional to the starting tractive effort, thus:

GWR/BR Power Class	Tractive effort	Example locomotive classes
Special	Over 38,000 lbf (169.0 kN)	6000 (King)
E	33,001–38,000 lbf (146.8–169.0 kN)	2884, 7200
D	25,001–33,000 lbf (111.2–146.8 kN)	4073 (Castle), 4300, 5600
C	20,501–25,000 lbf (91.2–111.2 kN)	4500, 5700
B	18,501–20,500 lbf (82.3–91.2 kN)	1101, 2251
A	16,500–18,500 lbf (73.4–82.3 kN)	1600, 2301
Ungrouped	Below 16,500 lbf (73.4 kN)	1361, 1400

The "Special" classification was not shown on the "King" class, but in the case of no. 111 The Great Bear, "Special" was shown by a cross (+) on its red route restriction disc.

Locomotives loaned during World War II were given GWR power class letters, in order to avoid confusion with different systems used by the lending railway. For example, the Southern Railway (SR) also used letters, but with A representing the highest power; so when the SR loaned some S15 class 4-6-0s to the GWR, which were power class A on the SR, they were placed in power class D by the GWR; similarly, the London, Midland and Scottish Railway loaned some 2-8-0 locomotives of their power class 8F, which were given GWR power class E.

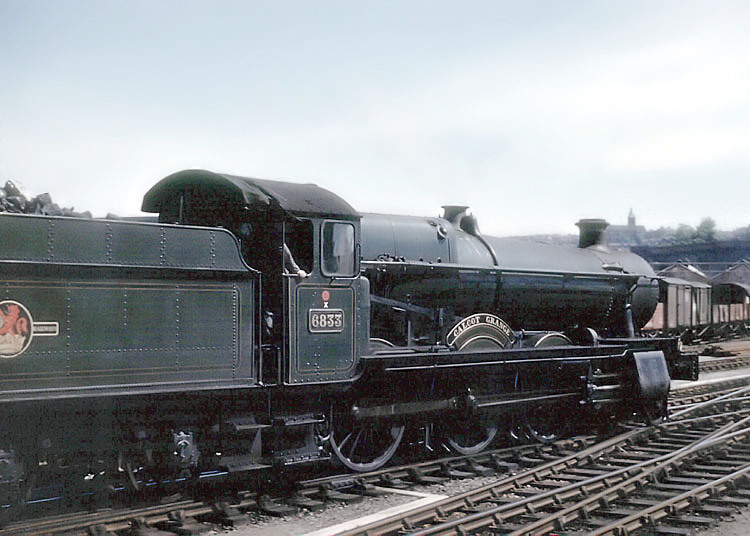
An ex-GWR 6800 (Grange) class steam locomotive, showing a white "X" below the red route restriction disc, indicating that the normal loads for its power class (D) could be exceeded

Also during World War II, it was decided that some classes of two-cylinder engines (including the 1000 (County), 4900 (Hall) and 6800 (Grange) classes) would be permitted to haul loads heavier than those specified in the working books for their power classification. These engines were distinguished by a white letter "X" painted above the number plate.

=== Weight restriction ===
The GWR system was divided into "red", "blue", "yellow" and "uncoloured" routes, according to the maximum axle load which the Civil Engineer would permit: for example, engines of axle load greater than 16 tons were not permitted onto "yellow" or "uncoloured" routes. In between these were "dotted red" and "dotted blue" routes, where overweight engines were permitted subject to speed restrictions. In addition, there were the "hatched red" routes, where any locomotive was permitted: the 6000 (King) class were barred from all except the "hatched red" routes. In August 1938 a summary of the GWR routes by colour was published:

Colour coding for routes
Colour	Geographical miles	Percentage	Notes
Hatched red	522	14%	All engines allowed
Red	1280	34%	All engines allowed, except King class
Dotted Red	285	8%	Red engines (see below) allowed at no more than 20 mph (32 km/h)
Blue	320	9%	
Dotted Blue	150	4%	Blue engines allowed at no more than 25 mph (40 km/h)
Yellow	695	18%	
Uncoloured	495	13%	

The "hatched red" routes comprised Paddington to Bristol Temple Meads, both via Bath and via Badminton; Reading to Devonport via Newbury; Bristol Temple Meads to Taunton; and Paddington to Wolverhampton Low Level via Bicester. Further routes were raised to this category after Nationalisation: Wolverhampton to Chester via Shrewsbury; and Bristol to Shrewsbury via Abergavenny.

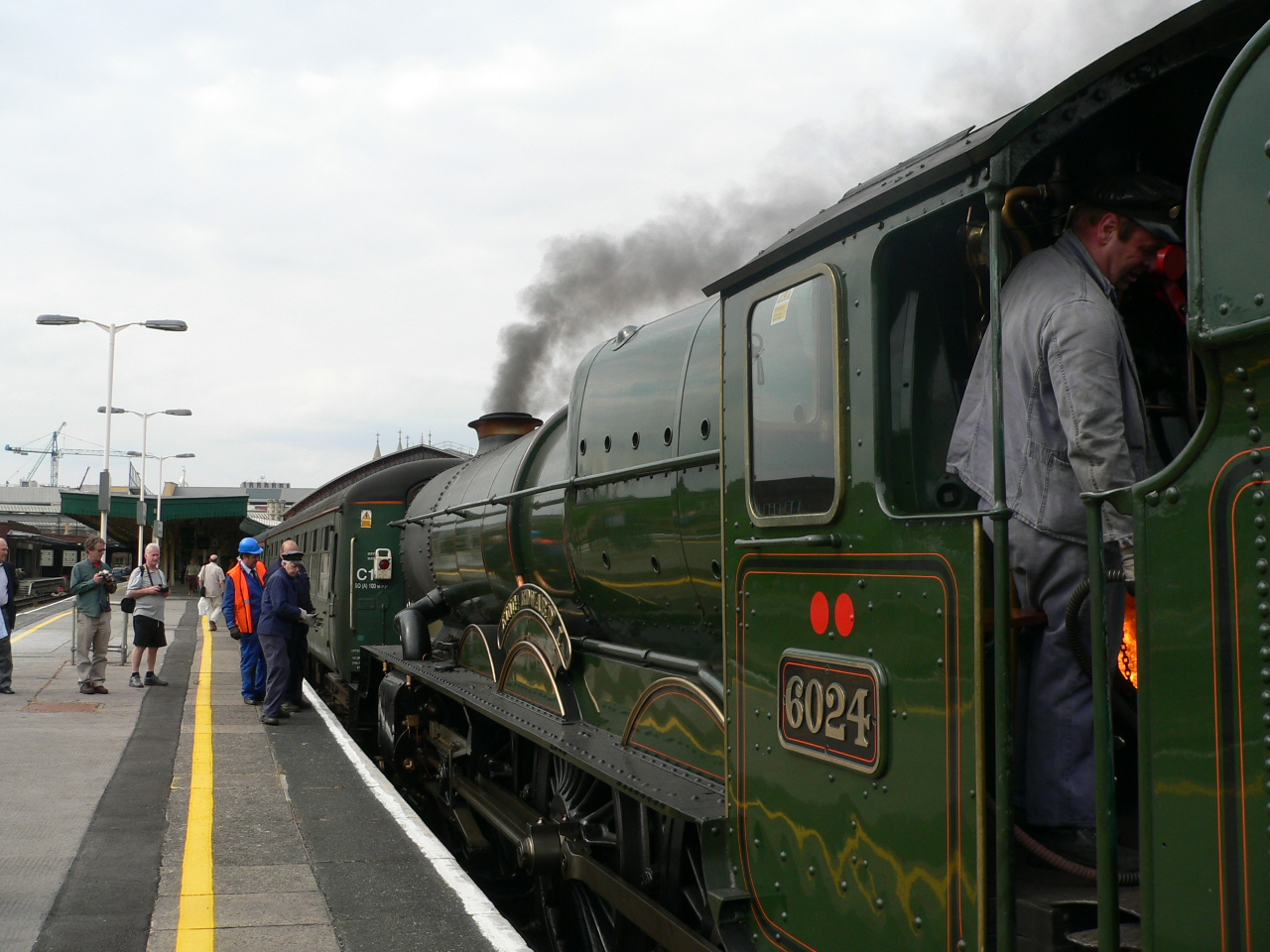
A preserved GWR 6000 (King) class steam locomotive, showing the double red discs painted above the numberplate denoting the most restrictive weight classification; the power class (Special) is not indicated

Up to two coloured discs were painted on the cabside of GWR steam locomotives and some Western Region diesel locomotive classes, to show that the maximum axle load of the engine did not exceed a particular value, the absence of such circles meaning that no restrictions applied to the locomotive:

Colour coding for locomotives
Colour	Symbol	Axle load	Example locomotive classes
Double Red		22 long tons 10 cwt (50,400 lb or 22.9 t)	6000 (King)
Red		Up to 20 long tons 0 cwt (44,800 lb or 20.3 t)	4700, 4900 (Hall), 9400, Class 42
Blue		Up to 17 long tons 12 cwt (39,400 lb or 17.9 t)	2884, 6100
Yellow		Up to 16 long tons 0 cwt (35,800 lb or 16.3 t)	2251, 4500, Class 22
Uncoloured		Up to 14 long tons 0 cwt (31,400 lb or 14.2 t)	1366, 2301

As with the power classifications, locomotives loaned to the GWR in World War II were given GWR weight restriction colours. For example, LNER Class J25 engines, which were RA3 on that line, were placed in GWR route restriction "Yellow".

There were occasional amendments in the light of operating experience; for example, the 5700 Class (which had an axle loading of 16 long tons 15 cwt (37,500 lb or 17 t)) were found to have a low hammer blow, so caused less damage to the track than other engines of their axle load; accordingly, in 1950, they were reclassified from "Blue" to "Yellow".
