= Charles Collett =

British railway engineer

Charles Collett OBE JP MInstCE MIMechE
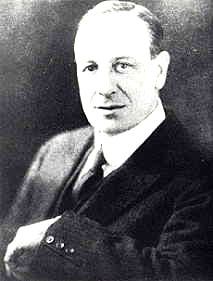
- Born: Charles Benjamin Collett; 10 September 1871
- Died: 5 April 1952 (aged 80)
- Education: Merchant Taylors School; City and Guilds Engineering College, South Kensington
- Occupation: Chief Mechanical Engineer
- Years active: 1922–1941
- Employer: Great Western Railway
- Predecessor: G.J. Churchward
- Successor: Frederick Hawksworth
- Spouse: Ethelwyn May Collett (1896–1923)
- Awards: OBE

Charles Benjamin Collett OBE JP MInstCE MIMechE (10 September 1871 – 5 April 1952) was Chief Mechanical Engineer of the Great Western Railway from 1922 to 1941. He designed (amongst others) the GWR's 4-6-0 Castle and King Class express passenger locomotives.

== Education and early career ==
Charles was the second son of the journalist William Collett (1843-1884) and his wife Mary Helen nee Cook (about 1847-1923). The family settled at 33 Tavistock Terrace, Westbourne Park and it was near here that his older brother, William Augustus Mallalue, was fatally injured whilst playing in the GWR Goods Yard on 18 September 1879. Charles reported the accident to a servant that William had lost both his legs. He died that evening at St Mary's Hospital.

C B Collett was educated at the Merchant Taylors' School (then at Charterhouse Square, London) and the City and Guilds College of London University. He then became an engineering pupil at Maudslay, Sons and Field, a firm that built marine steam engines. In 1893 he entered the GWR Drawing Office at Swindon as a junior draughtsman. Four years later he was put in charge of the buildings section, and in 1898 became assistant to the Chief Draughtsman. In June 1900 he was appointed Technical Inspector, and soon after Assistant Manager, at the Swindon Works. In 1912 he rose to be Manager of the Works, then in 1919 he was made Deputy Chief Mechanical Engineer of the GWR.

== Chief Mechanical Engineer ==
Collett's predecessor, George Jackson Churchward, had delivered to the GWR from Swindon a series of class-leading and innovative locomotives, and arguably by the early 1920s the Great Western‘s 2-cylinder and 4-cylinder 4-6-0 designs were substantially superior to the locomotives of the other railway groupings.

In 1922 Churchward retired, and Collett inherited a legacy of excellent standardised designs. But, with costs rising and revenues falling, there was a need to rationalise the number of pre-grouping designs and to develop more powerful locomotives. Collett was a practical development engineer and he took Churchward's designs and developed them – notably the Hall from the Saint class, and the Castle from the Star. He was also responsible for more humble locomotives, such as many of the pannier tank classes.

=== 4-cylinder engines ===
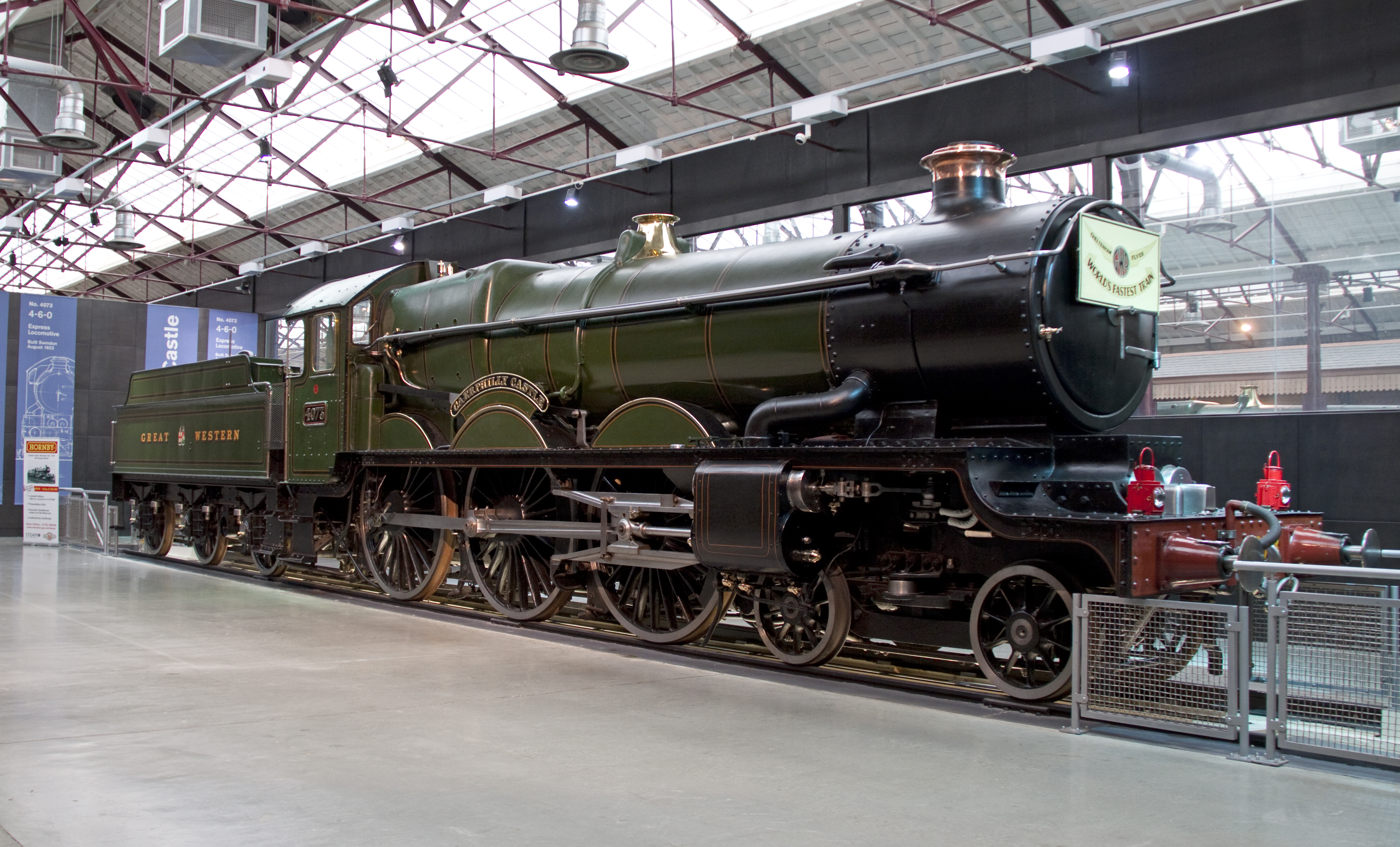
GWR Castle class 4073 Caerphilly Castle

By the time Churchward retired, his 4-cylinder Star class locomotives were becoming inadequate for the increasing loads and speeds expected of express passenger trains. To solve this, Churchward had proposed fitting a No 7 boiler (designed for the 4700 class 2-8-0 express freight engines) onto a Star. This was not possible, because the weight would be too great for the track. Instead, Collett enlarged the Star design, leaving the wheels the same but with bigger cylinders and a new standard boiler that would not exceed the 19 1/2 ton permitted axle load. He also fitted a more comfortable cab. The result was christened the Castle class, and the first engine, No 4073 Caerphilly Castle, was soon proudly paraded at the British Empire Exhibition, (placed close to the larger LNER Flying Scotsman) with the claim that it was 'Britain's most powerful passenger locomotive'.

One result of this provocative claim was an agreed exchange of locomotives between the companies. Castle class No 4079 Pendennis Castle went to the LNER in exchange for A1 class No 4474 Victor Wild. Both engines acquitted themselves well, but the performance of the smaller Castle led Gresley to investigate the cause and redesign the A1's valves, as well as give them a higher boiler pressure.

As well as rebuilding several Star class locomotives into Castles, Collett shocked some people by rebuilding the GWR's flagship 4-6-2 locomotive No 111 The Great Bear into a 4-6-0 Castle. This at least drew the attention of General Manager Sir Felix Pole to the restrictive permitted axle loads, which had constrained the usefulness of this prestige symbol. When larger locomotives were needed, Sir Felix instructed the Civil Engineer to ensure that the main lines (Paddington–Plymouth, via Westbury or Bristol, and Paddington–Wolverhampton via Bicester) could carry a 22 1/2 ton axle load. This was quickly done, since work was already underway to meet this standard.

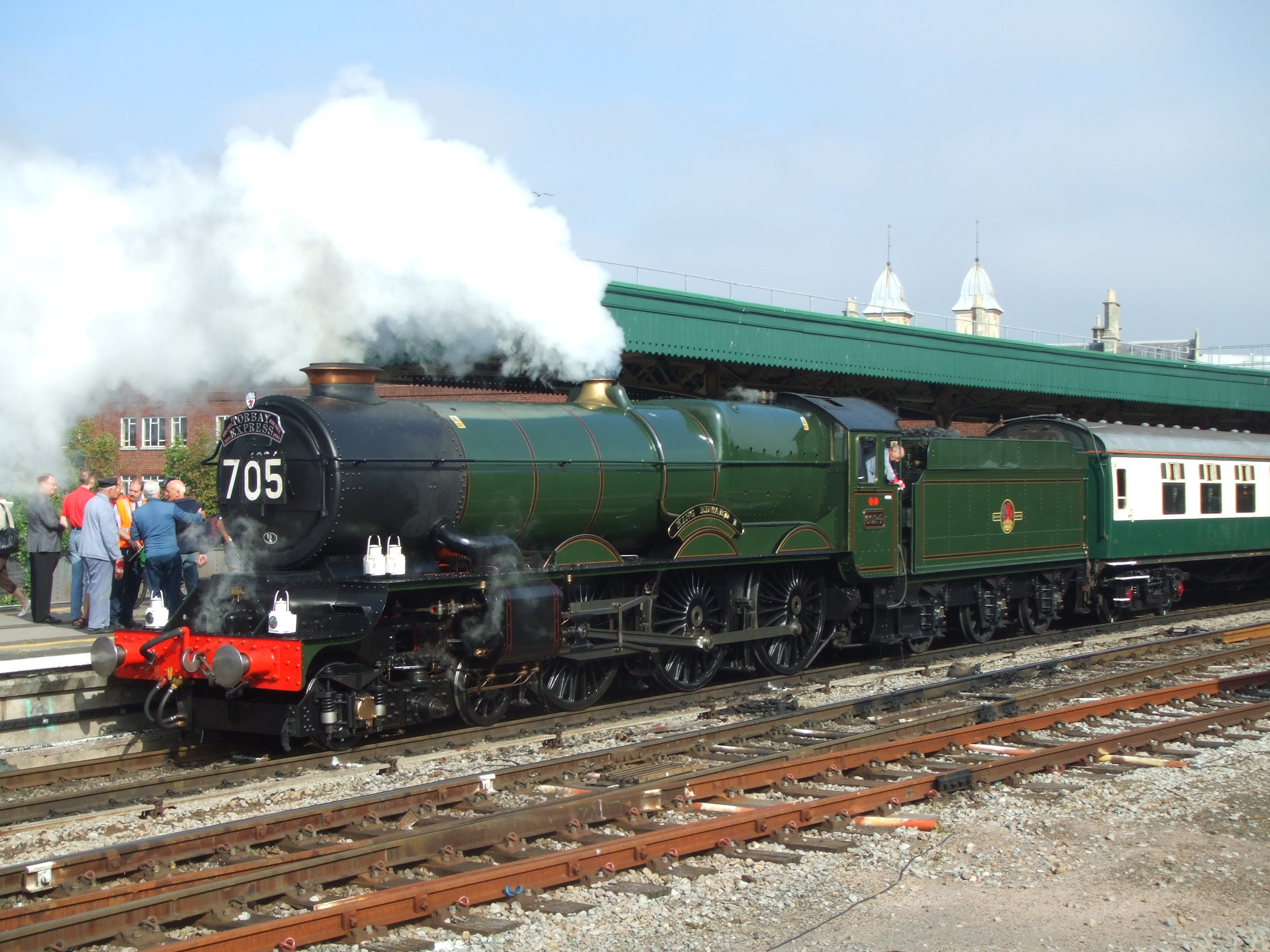
GWR King class 6024 King Edward I

By 1926, the other railway companies were catching up with the GWR, with designs such as the LNER Pacifics (improved as a result of the GWR/LNER locomotive exchange), SR Lord Nelson class, and the imminent LMS Royal Scot Class. Better locomotives were needed not only for faster and heavier trains, but also for to uphold the prestige of the GWR. Collett started by testing 6 ft 6 in driving wheels on No 5001 Llandovery Castle. When this proved satisfactory, he spread these wheels out under a larger and higher-pressure boiler, and increased the piston stroke to 28 inches, pushing the design to the limit both of the loading gauge and the newly increased axle load. Fitting these increased dimensions together required an unusual front bogie, with outside bearings on the front axle but inside bearings on the rear, to clear the inside and outside cylinders respectively. Finally, the first loco (or first five) had cylinders bored out to 16 1/4 inches. The significance of this small change was that it pushed the calculated tractive effort over 40,000 lbs, as required by Sir Felix Pole, thereby emphasising the locomotive's status as the most powerful passenger locomotive in the country. It was named the King class.

Like the Castle class, the King class was exploited for its publicity value. The very first one, No 6000 King George V, was shipped off to America where it led the parade of engines at the Baltimore and Ohio Railroad Centenary Exhibition, and whence it returned carrying a commemorative bell on its front buffer beam. The King class remained the heaviest and most powerful 4-6-0 engine in Britain. Stanier paid it the compliment of using its principal dimensions (Boiler pressure, cylinder size and wheel diameter—and therefore tractive effort) in his first design, the 4-6-2 LMS Princess Royal Class.

However, while it has been described as Collett's masterpiece, the suggestion has also been made that it was largely the responsibility of Hawksworth, Collett's eventual successor, who was then Chief Draughtsman.

==== Streamlining ====
A curious event in the story of the 4-cylinder designs was the appearance of two streamlined locomotives. In the 1930s there was a vogue for streamlining, and Collett came under pressure to produce a streamlined locomotive for the GWR, particularly in view of the forthcoming centenary of the company in 1935. The story goes that Collett took a paperweight model of a King, and smeared plasticine over it to produce an outline for the drawing office to work from. Although probably apocryphal, this may have been as good a way of designing a streamlined loco as any, short of carrying out tests in a wind tunnel. Collett was certainly aware of the many other factors causing drag. As The Great Western Railway Magazine put it, "Rigorous application of the principles of scientific streamlining becomes not only difficult but practically inexpedient, as the net reduction in the total resistance may be relatively small." In March 1935, locomotives 5305 Manorbier Castle and 6014 King Henry VII were outshopped with a hemispherical dome over the front of the smokebox, fairings covering the front buffer beam, cylinders, and splashers, fairings behind the chimney and dome, a vee-shaped cab front and a tapered roof over the tender. Both of these engines, and no others, were given a full-page photograph in the GWR's 1935 publication Swindon Works and its place in Great Western Railway History, but without any further descriptive text. The locomotives gradually lost the streamlined features as they passed through the shops in following years.

=== Absorbed locomotives and the 5600 class 0-6-2T ===
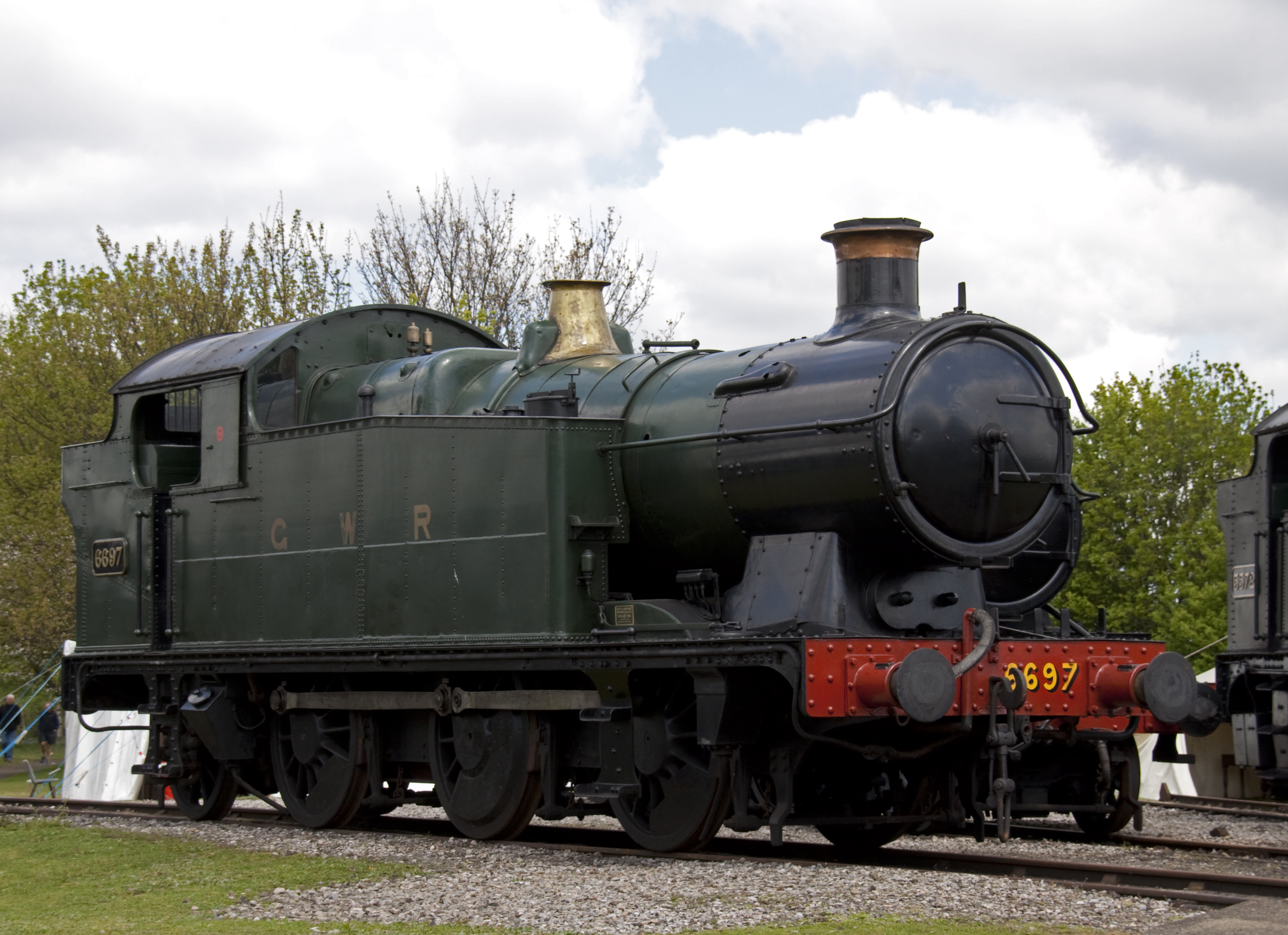
GWR 5600 class no. 6697

Collett became CME just before the grouping of British railway companies took effect on 1st January 1923. Although the GWR retained its identity by virtue of being grouped with many much smaller railways, it did make Collett responsible overnight for over 800 locomotives, of a wide variety of designs, many in a state of disrepair. The ones in the worst condition could only be scrapped; those in a better condition were surveyed to establish which could be refitted with boilers from the GWR standard range, including three new boilers modified for the purpose. The scrapping of so many unmaintainable engines left a shortfall in power, especially in the Welsh valleys where the widely-used compact inside-cylinder 0-6-2T engines were hard to replace with standard GWR classes. Collett decided to build a new class, based on the Rhymney Railway R class 0-6-2T. Although it used a standard No. 2 boiler, and as many other standard parts as possible, the cylinder castings, wheels, hornblocks, valve gear and three-bar motion crosshead were all new designs. The 5600 class was powerful and versatile, working both passenger and freight trains in the Welsh valleys in a characteristic 'facing up the valley' direction, so that on the faster descending services, the pony truck helped to keep them stable.

However, one story indicates that the development of these engines was not without problems. According to Hurry Riches, the son of the last Locomotive Superintendent of the Rhymney Railway, who had been taken on by the GWR and worked on the new class, the first engine of the class stalled dramatically when it was first steamed. Investigation showed that in the transfer of the standard Stephenson valve-gear arrangement from outside-cylinder use to an inside-cylinder design, the function of the rocker shaft (a substantial bearing that transferred the valve motion through the frames to drive the steam chest) in withstanding off-axis forces was not appreciated, and inadequate support was provided for the end of the valve spindle. The result was that when steamed, the valve spindle bent under the strain, throwing the whole motion out of alignment. A quick fix had to be developed before any of the locomotives could be rolled out, and the story was apparently suppressed to avoid embarrassment at a senior level.

=== 2-cylinder standard tender classes ===
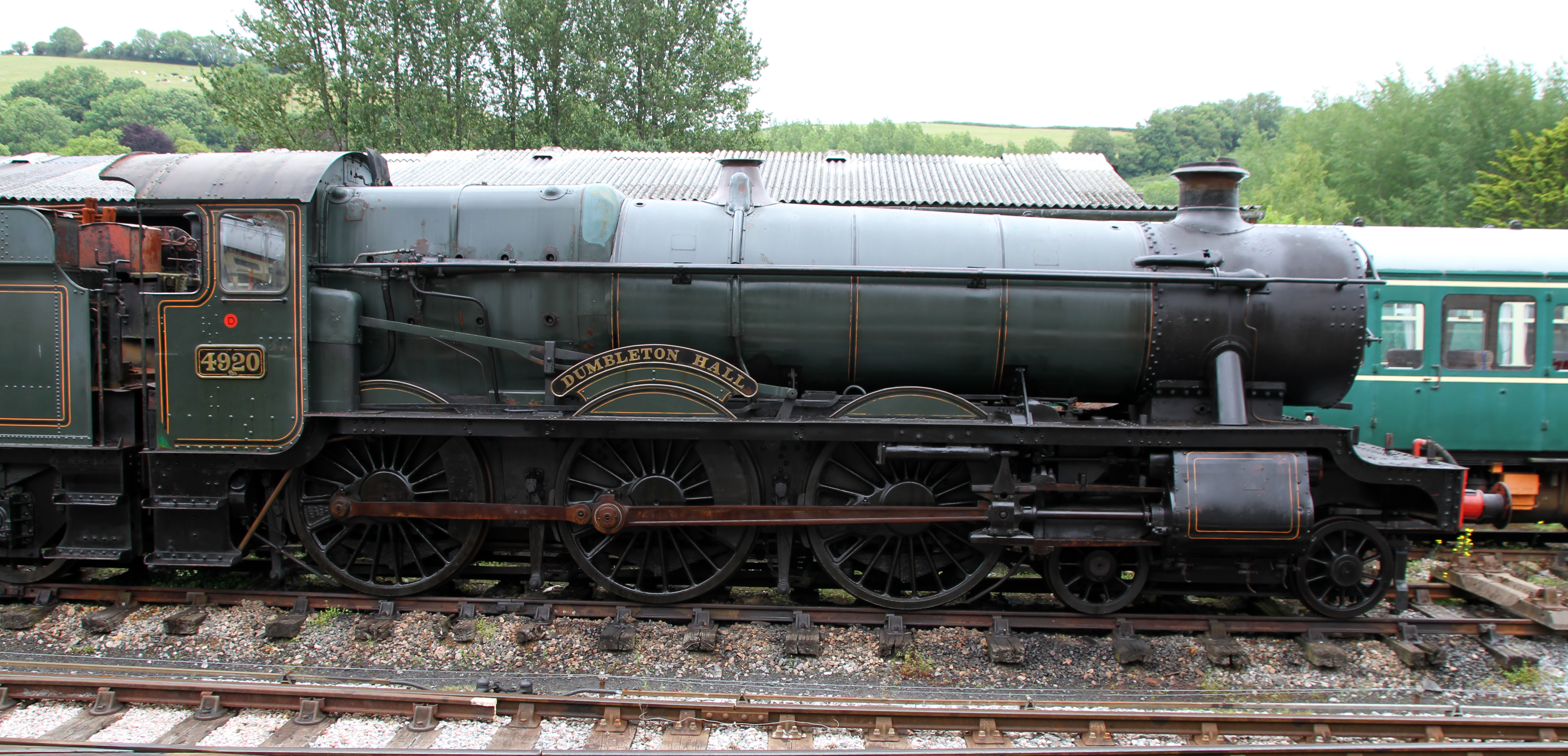
GWR Hall class 4920 Dumbleton Hall

Collett built no more of Churchward's Saint class locomotives, but he did build further batches of the 2-6-0 'Moguls' in 1925 and 1932. The Running Department asked him to build an enlarged version of this engine, as crews had a tendency to expect too much of it (possibly due to its similarity with larger classes). However, Collett preferred to modify a Saint. He took No 2925 Saint Martin, and fitted it with smaller 6 ft (1.829 m) wheels. Over three years of testing, it proved itself a useful and popular mixed-traffic engine. In 1928 a batch of 80 engines of the new Hall class was ordered, differing from the Saints only in having the smaller wheels and a more generous side-window cab. Further batches totalling 259 locos were built up till 1943, and—together with his successor Hawksworth's 71 Modified Halls—made up the largest class of named locomotives on the GWR. Later testing showed that the Hall class suffered a marked reduction in drawbar horsepower when running over 50mph, as the boiler and cylinders designed for the Saint's 6 ft 8 1/2 in (2.045 m) wheels struggled to keep up with the faster revolving smaller wheels. Apart from one war casualty, and the prototype Saint Martin (which was not new when rebuilt as a Hall), none were withdrawn from service until 1960.

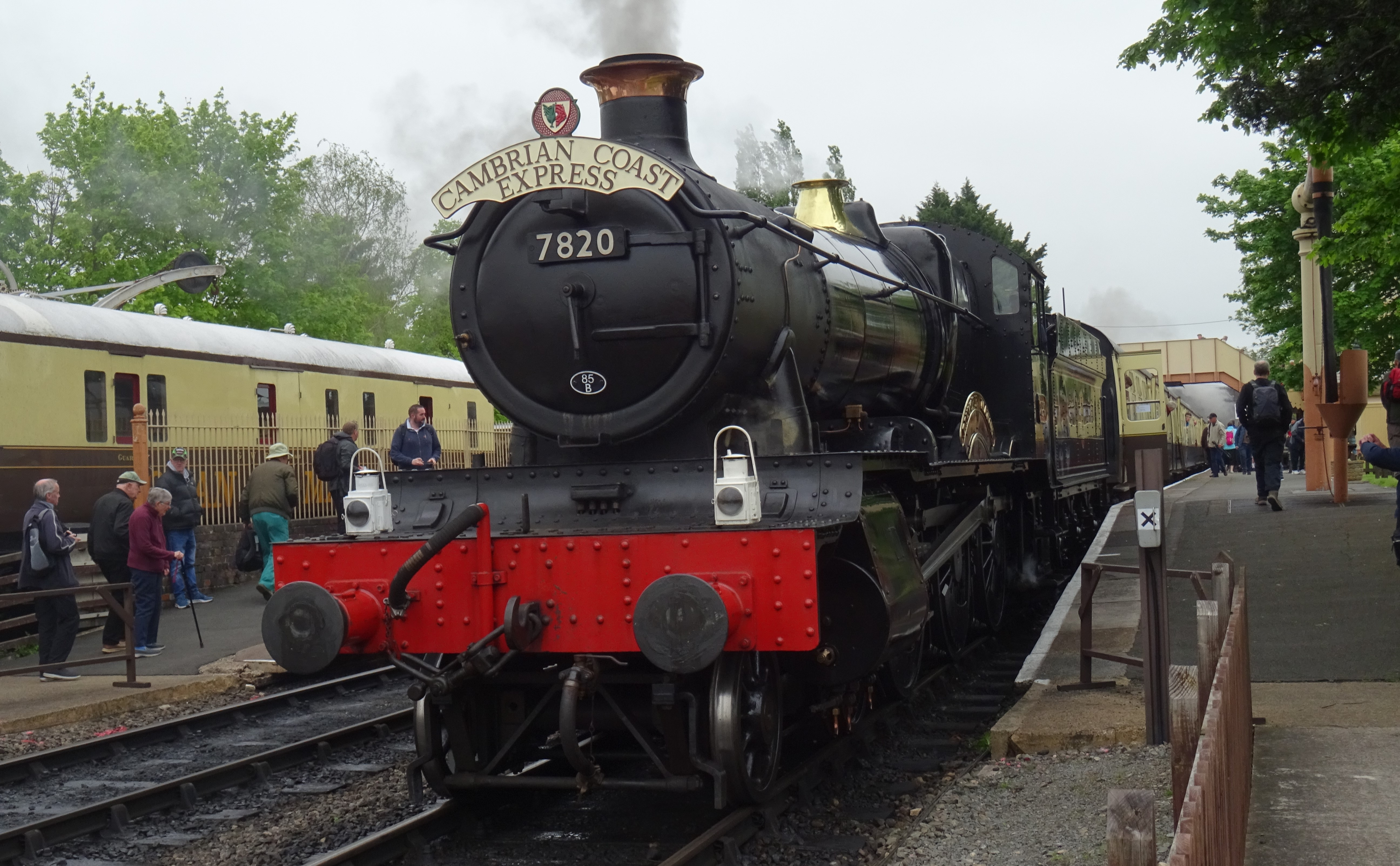
GWR Manor class 7820 Dinmore Manor

In 1901 Churchward had proposed, as part of his set of standard locomotive classes, a two-cylinder 4-6-0 with 5 ft 8 in (1.727 m) wheels, but never developed one. In 1936, seeking to replace the older 4300 'Moguls', Collett produced such a locomotive as the Grange class. Indeed, he withdrew 80 of the 'Moguls', and used the wheels and motion as part of a 4-6-0 with the same No 1 boiler as the Halls. One disadvantage was that the Granges were heavier than the 'Moguls' and thus had more limited route availability. To answer this, in 1938 Collett withdrew another 20 'Moguls', and again used the wheels and motion to build a 4-6-0, this time with the specially developed, lightweight, No 14 boiler. These were the Manor class. Even though they were indifferent steamers until the draughting of the boiler was investigated and modified in 1951–52, British Railways still built another ten Manors (without any 'Mogul' parts) in 1950.

Collett continued to build more 2-8-0s in the form of the 2884 class, which differed only in detail, not in the principal dimensions, from Churchward's 2800 class of 1903. The last of this class was built by Collett's successor Hawksworth in 1942, and this (by then 45 year old) class was represented in the 1948 Locomotive Exchange Trials.

=== 2-cylinder standard tank classes ===
In 1927 Collett produced a version of Churchward's small-wheeled 2-6-2T class with larger water tanks having sloped front ends, the 4575 class. He also continued to build Churchward's large-wheeled 2-6-2T design in the shape of the 1929 5101 class, followed in 1931 by the 6100 class with a higher boiler pressure of 225 lbf/in^{2} (1.55 MPa), then in 1938 by the 8100 class with smaller 5 ft 6 in (1.676 m) wheels, and in the same year the 3100 class with even smaller 5 ft 3 in (1.600 m) wheels. Both of these latter classes were rebuilds of older 2-6-2T engines.

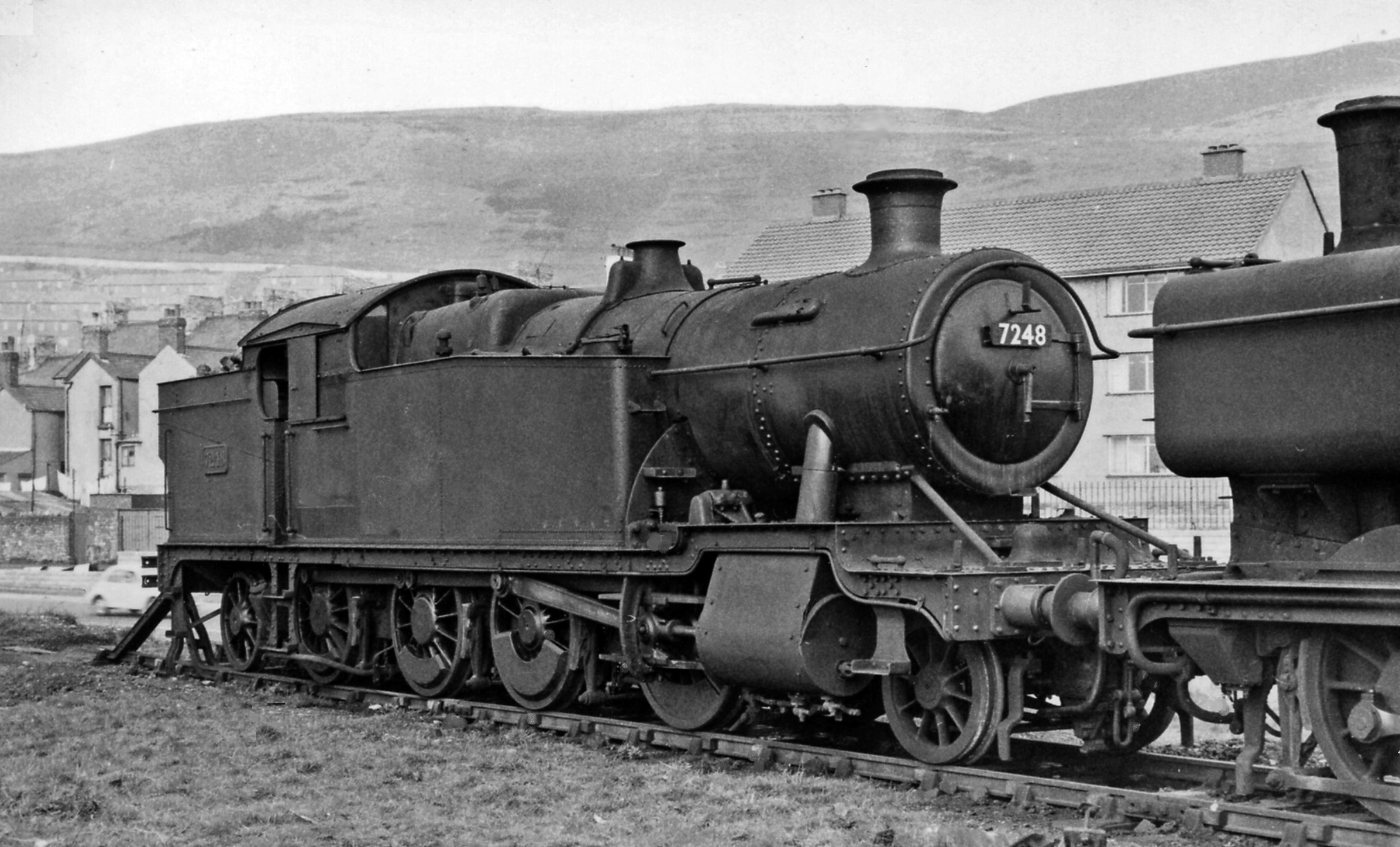
GWR 7200 class no. 7248

He also built more of Churchward's 2-8-0T engines, giving the 5205 class marginally larger diameter 19 in × 30 in (483 mm × 762 mm) cylinders. 70 of these were built between 1923 and 1926. A further batch of 20 was built in 1930, but due to the depression of the late 1920s, the short-haul South Wales coal trains for which they were intended had decreased, and they were placed in storage. When in 1934 Collett needed to replace the ageing 2-6-0 Aberdare class, he turned to these stored locomotives. In order to increase their range—the 4 ton bunker capacity limited their length of run—he extended the frames at the rear to take a trailing axle which supported an enlarged 6 ton bunker. This was the 7200 class of 2-8-2Ts, and 53 were built in three batches up till 1939, all rebuilds of 2-8-0Ts. A further batch of 10 5205 class 2-8-0Ts was built in 1940 as wartime traffic made them useful again.

=== Pannier tank engines ===
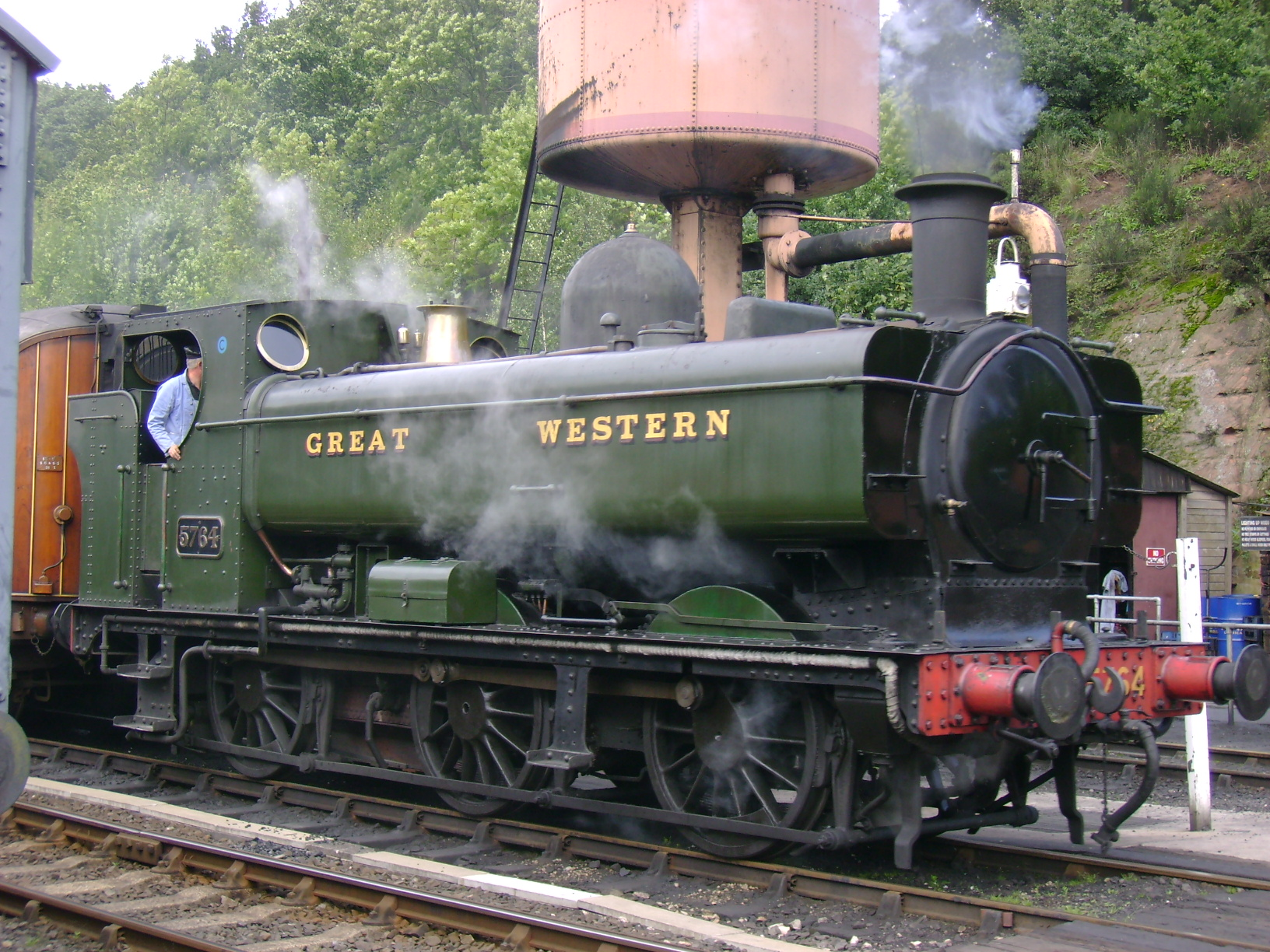
GWR 5700 class no. 5764

The first pannier tanks on GWR engines were introduced by Churchward, as saddle tanks were unsuitable when older engines received new boilers with Belpaire fireboxes. However, he never designed any standard classes using pannier tanks. In 1929 Collett started to replace the hundreds of 0-6-0ST and 0-6-0PT engines that survived from the Victorian and subsequent rebuilding. For this he developed an existing design, the 2721 class of 0-6-0ST/PT, fitting them with a Belpaire boiler pressed to 200 lbf/in^{2} (1.4 MPa), a larger 3 ton 6 cwt bunker, an all-over cab and improved valve events. No testing was done, and 100 engines of the new 5700 class were ordered as a first batch (the first 50 being built by North British). They were soon followed by another 200 funded by a Government work-creation scheme. All of these were built by outside suppliers: W. G. Bagnall (50), Kerr, Stuart (25), North British (50), Yorkshire Engine Co. (25), Armstrong Whitworth (25), and Beyer, Peacock (25). Further batches were built at Swindon throughout the 1930s and '40s, and one final batch of 10 in 1950 after Nationalization, for a total of 863 locomotives.

In March 1932, No 8700 was converted to a condensing engine for use on the underground Metropolitan line serving Smithfield Market. This led to the construction of ten new condensing engines (with improved cabs), still considered part of the 5700 class, numbered 9701–9710.

One of the more demanding jobs that Collett needed to find new engines for was autotrain working. These trains had to keep to a strict schedule, on some very challenging branch routes, requiring good acceleration and sure-footedness. After considering a number of types, he took No 2080, an 0-6-0ST of Armstrong's 2021 class, and refitted it with larger 5 ft 2 in (1.575 m) wheels, and pannier tanks. After testing proved this a successful design, he took No 2062 of the same class and carried out a more comprehensive rebuilding, including 16 1/2 in × 24 in (419 mm × 610 mm) cylinders, new motion and a Standard No 21 boiler at 165 lbf/in^{2} (1.14 MPa). This became the first of the 5400 class, and appeared in 1930. Production of the class followed in batches up till 1935, totalling 25 locomotives.

Collett also updated Churchward's 0-6-0ST 1361 dock shunting tanks, turning out a modernised version with pannier tanks as the 1366 class. Initially intended for Swindon Works, they were later used elsewhere, including Weymouth Docks.

Some autotrain routes, such as those in South Wales, were more steeply graded. To provide for these, Collett took one of his previous prototypes, No 2062 (now running as 5400), and reduced the wheel diameter to 4 ft 7 1/2 in (1.410 m). When this proved satisfactory, he ordered a batch of ten forming the new 6400 class. Further batches took production to a total of 40. Like the 5400 class, these were all fitted for autotrain working. For other duties, Collett created a variant with a higher boiler pressure of 180 lbf/in^{2} (1.2 MPa), but not auto-fitted, and 50 of these were produced numbered in the 7400 series.

=== Other steam engines ===
At the Grouping the GWR had absorbed many lines, such as those in Central Wales, that were lightly built and needed light engines to operate them. By the 1930s, the Victorian 0-6-0s which had filled these duties were wearing out. Still available were the Dean Goods, renovated by the fitting of more modern Belpaire boilers. To free them up from other duties, Collett designed the 2251 class of inside-cylindered 0-6-0 tender engines. Very similar in frames and motion to the 5700 Pannier tanks, but with cylinders designed to support a No 10 standard boiler, they were given a Yellow route classification (slightly heavier than the Dean Goods). 120 engines were built from 1930 to 1948 by Collett and Hawksworth. They were able and popular engines, capable of pulling light passenger trains at 60 mph. As well as branch line duties, they were used on main line stopping trains.

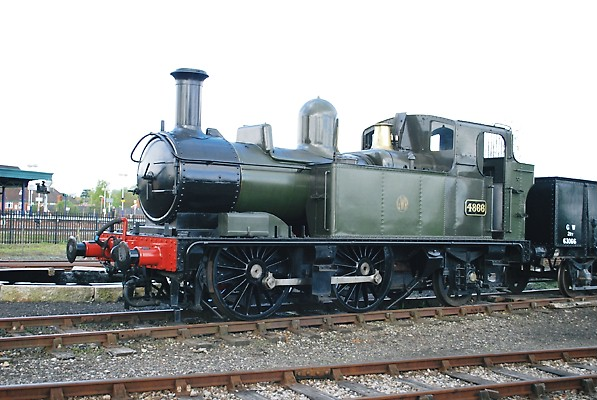
GWR 4800 class no. 4866

For another engine, Collett looked back to the GWR 517 Class for inspiration. Using the same 0-4-2T outline, but modern components in common with the 5400 and 6400 0-6-0PTs, he created the 4800 class. The 75 engines of the 4800 series were all fitted for autotrain working, and were widely distributed around the GWR network. The 20 engines of the 5800 series were identical but not auto-fitted, and less widely spread. In 1946, the 4800 series 0-4-2Ts were renumbered into the 1400 range to make way for some of the 2800 class 2-8-0s which were converted to oil-burning and renumbered in the 4800 range. The 5800s were not renumbered. The 1400s, being small and nowhere near the end of their working life when steam was withdrawn on British Railways, were popular targets for saving, and four have been preserved.

Starting in 1936, Collett took the boilers from a number of old Duke class engines, and mounted them on the frames of some Bulldog class engines. This economical combination of the better parts of older engines was produced as the Earl class, though they were widely termed the Dukedogs due to their origins. Collett was aware that certain members of the GWR Board of Directors (whom he considered pompous) desired that their names should be given to suitable steam engines, and he therefore applied them to Earl class locomotives. When the directors saw their names on these distinctly Victorian-looking double-framed 4-4-0s, they were not amused. The names were later transferred to some of the more impressive Castle class.

Collett bought six 0-4-0T dock shunting engines from the Avonside Engine Company to replace engines absorbed from the Swansea Harbour Trust. This 1101 class was an Avonside design to Collett's specification. They were later modified with a rounded-off cab, for better clearance under tight bridges, and standard GWR safety valve covers.

Minor developments, of less significance to the GWR, were a brief experiment with a Sentinel geared locomotive, and the building/rebuilding of three 2-6-2T engines for the narrow-gauge Vale of Rheidol Railway.

=== Diesel railcars ===
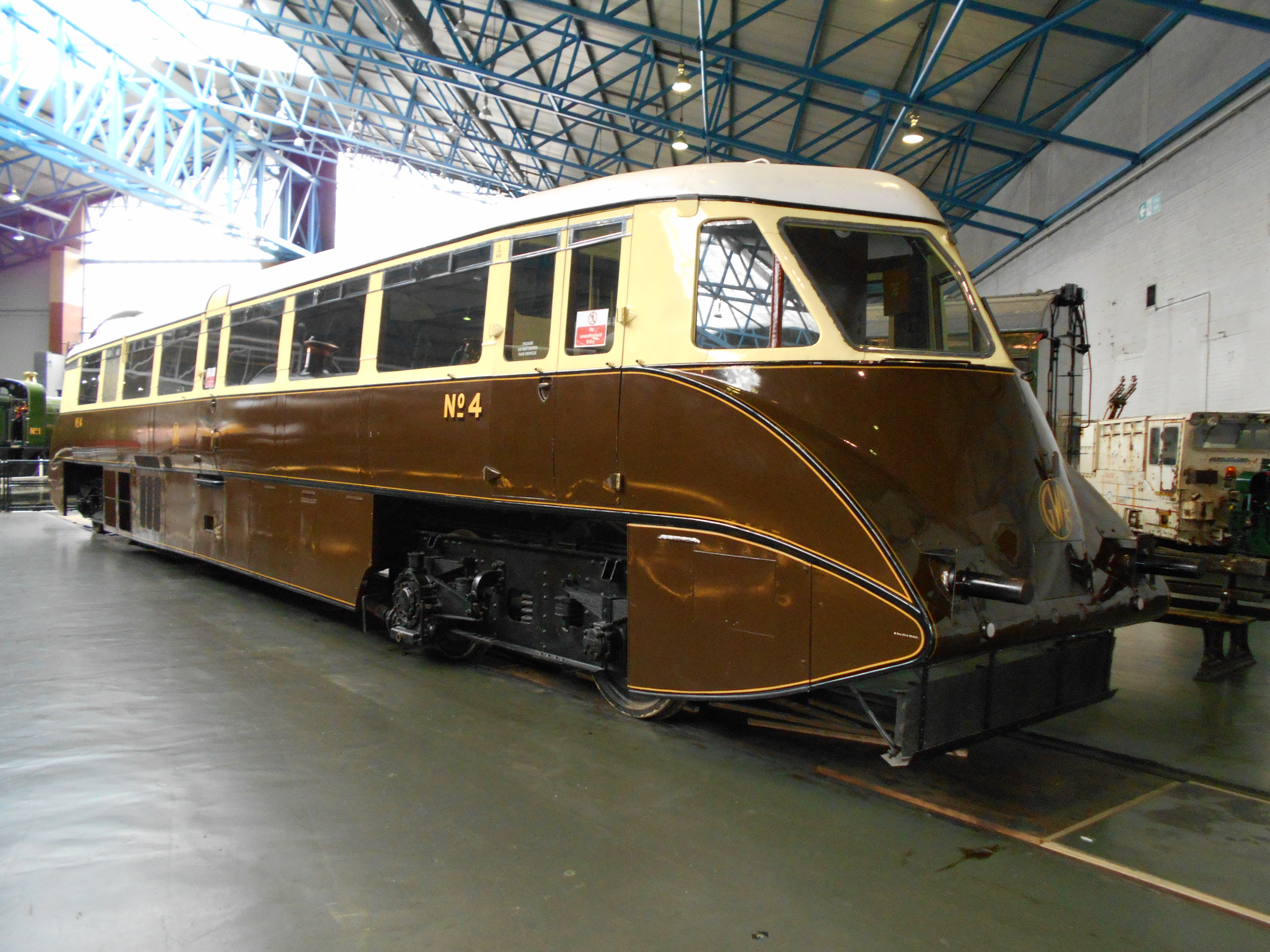
GWR diesel railcar no. 4

While Collett did a lot of reimagining and redevelopment of older steam locomotive designs, he also introduced some very novel diesel railcars. In 1933, AEC built railcar No 1 for the GWR, a streamlined, 121bhp passenger coach with a cab at each end. This proved underpowered, but Collett recognised its potential, and ordered Nos 2–4 which were dual-engined and capable of 75-80mph carrying 44 passengers. A further twelve were purchased in 1935–36. All of these were self-contained; they were not intended to pull other carriages. No 17 was for parcel traffic and carried no passengers.

A further 20 railcars were built at Swindon in 1940–42, with more angular streamlining and no valances over the bogies. These were equipped to pull a load of up to 60 tons, and fitted with autotrain controls so they could be driven from a cab at the far end of an attached autocoach. Nos 35–38 were single-ended, having only one streamlined end with a cab. They were designed to be used back-to-back, or with a coach between them.

=== Other development ===
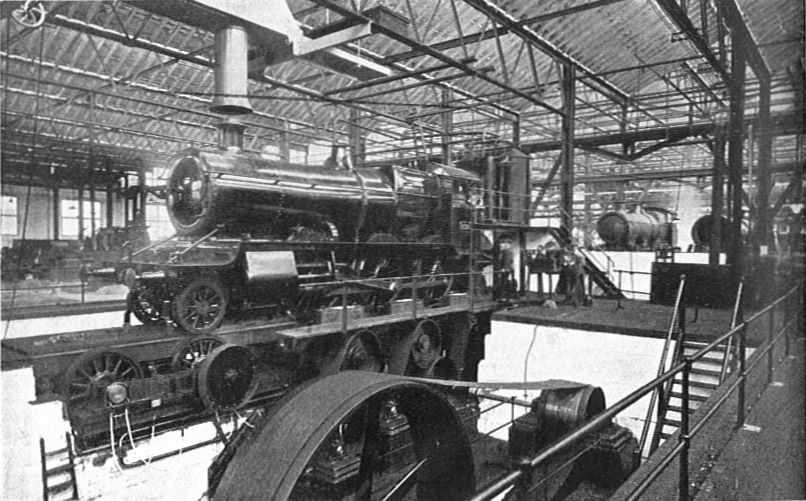
Swindon stationary test plant

In 1933, Collett purchased an 0-4-0 diesel shunter, GWR No. 1, from John Fowler & Co. for use in Swindon Works. A larger 0-6-0 diesel shunter, GWR No. 2, was bought from Hawthorne Leslie in 1935 for use in the Acton goods yard. This second design was the forerunner of the BR Class 08.

Collett was responsible for far more than introducing new and updated locomotives. He replaced Churchward's crimson lake livery, reintroducing the old 'chocolate and cream' colours for coaching stock, in 1922, when the backlog of stock maintenance due to WWI was being tackled. He made good use of the dynamometer car to try out new designs. He modernised and strengthened the stationary test plant at Swindon Works to allow testing of engines generating 2,000 hp (1,500 kW), or running at 70 mph (110 km/h). In 1934 he introduced the use of Zeiss optical apparatus during locomotive manufacturing to improve the accuracy with which frames and bearing, cylinders and motion were lined up. This doubled the mileage that a locomotive could cover before the motion needed attention.

Collett introduced buckeye couplings for coaching stock, and experimented briefly with articulated coaches in 1925. In 1931 he introduced the luxurious 'Super Saloons' for the Paddington–Plymouth boat train, as well as the less ornate but more modern 'Centenary' coaches in 1935. However, he knew that these large vehicles had limited route availability, and brought about an agreement that all future stock should be no more than 8 ft 11 in (2.718 m) wide, to maximise its route availability.

== Legacy ==
A gifted technical engineer, who could look at existing designs and reliably improve them, Collett produced a standardized fleet of locomotives ideally suited to the GWR's requirements. He was able to extract substantial performance gains out of the Churchward designs. In 1924 he reported (in a paper to the World Power Conference) Castle class coal consumption of 2.83 lb per drawbar-horsepower hour, a figure dismissed as too good to be true by many engineers, but taken seriously by Gresley after the locomotive exchange of 1925.

Collett has received criticism by contemporary engineers and later railway historians for undertaking very little innovation in his designs, instead sticking with Churchward's style in every case. Arguably this meant that by the time Collett retired the superiority of Great Western locomotives was lost to more modern designs, particularly those of William Stanier, who worked at Swindon before moving to the LMS in 1932. Stanier took Churchward's style with him, but developed it in line with continuing improvements in steam locomotive technology.

== Personal life ==
Collett married Ethelwyn May Simon (1875/6-1923) at St George's, Bloomsbury on 4 November 1896. They had no children. Ethelwyn's premature death in 1923 came as a great shock, and thereafter Collett avoided most social activities. He was very little involved in Swindon's civic affairs, in contrast to his predecessors, but he was a magistrate from 1921 to 1928.

== See also ==
- Locomotives of the Great Western Railway § Charles Collett (1922-1941)
- List of GWR standard classes with two outside cylinders

=== Charles Collett’s Locomotive Designs ===
- GWR No. 12 0-4-0TG
- GWR 1101 Class 0-4-0T
- GWR 1366 Class 0-6-0T
- GWR 5400 Class 0-6-0PT
- GWR 5700 Class 0-6-0PT
- GWR 6400/7400 Class 0-6-0PT
- GWR 4800/1400 Class 0-4-2T
- GWR 5800 Class 0-4-2T
- GWR 5600 Class 0-6-2T
- GWR 3100 Class 2-6-2T
- GWR 5101 Class 2-6-2T
- GWR 6100 Class 2-6-2T
- GWR 4575 Class 2-6-2T
- GWR 8100 Class 2-6-2T
- GWR 5205 Class 2-8-0T
- GWR 7200 Class 2-8-2T
- GWR 4073 Castle class 4-6-0
- GWR 6000 King class 4-6-0
- GWR 4900 Hall Class 4-6-0
- GWR 6800 Grange Class 4-6-0
- GWR 7800 Manor Class 4-6-0
- GWR 2251 Class 0-6-0
- GWR 3200 Earl Class 4-4-0
- GWR 2884 Class 2-8-0
- GWR diesel shunters
- GWR railcars
- VoR 2-6-2T (narrow gauge)

== Notes ==
Business positions
Preceded by George Jackson Churchward	Chief Mechanical Engineer of Great Western Railway; 1922–1941	Succeeded by Frederick Hawksworth
