= GWR 111 The Great Bear =

Steam locomotive in Great Britain

The Great Bear
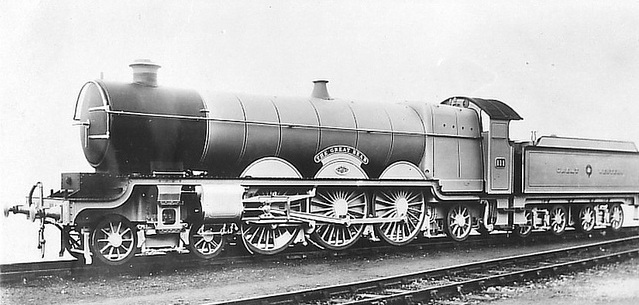
- 111 The Great Bear in 1908
Type and origin
- Power type: Steam
- Designer: George Jackson Churchward
- Builder: GWR, Swindon Works
- Order number: Lot 171
- Serial number: 2279
- Build date: February 1908
- Total produced: 1
- Rebuilder: GWR, Swindon
- Rebuild date: 7 January 1924
- Number rebuilt: 1
Specifications
- Configuration
  - Whyte: 4-6-2
  - UIC: 2'C1'h4
- Gauge: 4 ft 8 1/2 in (1,435 mm) standard gauge
- Leading dia.: 3 ft 2 in (0.965 m)
- Driver dia.: 6 ft 8.5 in (2.045 m)
- Trailing dia.: 3 ft 8 in (1.118 m)
- Wheelbase: 34 ft 6 in (10.52 m)
- Length: 71 ft 2.025 in (21.69 m)
- Axle load: 20 long tons (20 t; 22 short tons)
- Adhesive weight: 60 long tons (61 t; 67 short tons)
- Loco weight: 97 long tons (99 t; 109 short tons)
- Tender weight: 45.75 long tons (46.48 t; 51.24 short tons)
- Total weight: 142.75 long tons (145.04 t; 159.88 short tons)
- Tender type: 8 wheel bogie
- Fuel type: Coal
- Fuel capacity: 6 long tons (6.1 t; 6.7 short tons)
- Water cap.: 3,500 US gal (13,000 L; 2,900 imp gal)
- Firebox
  - Grate area: 41.79 sq ft (3.882 m^{2})
- Boiler: GWR Standard No. 6
- Boiler pressure: 225 psi (1.551 MPa)
- Heating surface
  - Firebox: 158.154 sq ft (14.6930 m^{2})
  - Tubes and flues: 2,697.67 sq ft (250.622 m^{2})
  - Total surface: 3,400.81 sq ft (315.946 m^{2})
- Superheater
  - Type: Swindon No. 1, Field-tube, 3-row
  - Heating area: 545 sq ft (50.6 m^{2})
- Cylinders: 4
- Cylinder size: 15 in × 26 in (381 mm × 660 mm)
Performance figures
- Tractive effort: 27,800 lbf (124 kN) (at 85% boiler pressure)
Career
- Operators: GWR
- Class: 111
- Power class: Special
- Number in class: 1
- Numbers: 111
- Official name: The Great Bear, renamed Viscount Churchill in 1924
- Axle load class: Red
- Locale: Great Western Main Line (Paddington - Bristol)
- First run: 4 February 1908
- Retired: (rebuilt 1924) July 1953
- Disposition: Front end reused to build another GWR 4073 Class, rest of the locomotive was scrapped

The Great Bear, number 111, was a one-off 4-6-2 Pacific steam locomotive of the Great Western Railway. It was the first 4-6-2 (Pacific) locomotive used on a railway in Great Britain, and the only one of its type built by the GWR.

== Origins ==
There are differing views as to why Churchward and the GWR should have built a Pacific locomotive in 1908 when current and future locomotive practice for the railway was centred on the 4-6-0 wheel arrangement. One suggestion is that The Great Bear was built in 1908 to satisfy demands from the directors for the largest locomotive in Britain, and much was made of the locomotive by the GWR's publicity department. However, O. S. Nock was adamant that the design "was entirely due to Churchward, and not to outside influences that pressed the project upon him". Nock regarded the locomotive as "primarily an exercise in boiler design", with Churchward looking forward to a time when his Star Class locomotives could no longer cope with increasing loads. Others have referred to a statement made to the GWR board in 1906 about the GWR-designed 4-4-2 North Star, where Churchward stated that a 4-6-2 would be bigger than required at that time but that such a design was being prepared. The order for The Great Bear was placed in January 1907.

== Design ==
The front-end layout of the class was the same as that for the Star Class except that Churchward fitted 15 in (380 mm) diameter cylinders, the maximum possible without fouling the rear wheels of the front bogie. However, the design of the boiler was entirely new, and with a barrel of 23 ft (7.010 m) in length, which was exceptionally long both by contemporary and later standards. The main reason Churchward adopted the 4-6-2 wheel arrangement was to enable him to fit a wide firebox over the trailing wheels. With a firebox surface of 182 sq ft (16.9 m^{2}), this was a 17.5% increase in size compared to the Star Class. It was also built with a Swindon No. 1 superheater.

== Power classification ==
With the introduction of Great Western Railway Power Classification in 1920, the power classification was "Special" (denoted by a black "+" on the red route availability disc,) although the tractive effort of 27,800 lbf (124,000 N) fell within the range for "D".

== Performance ==
In service, the performance of The Great Bear proved to be disappointing and not a significant improvement on existing classes. "The excessive tube and barrel length of 23 feet made for bulk rather than efficiency". Also, the axle boxes of the trailing wheels tended to become overheated due to their proximity to the firebox. Churchward attempted to improve the locomotive's performance by adding a Swindon No. 3 Superheater in 1913 and top-feed apparatus. However, the excellent performance of the Star Class and the advent of the First World War brought a stop to further experimentation without significant improvement.

== Route availability ==
In addition to the disappointing performance, the locomotive had a highly restrictive route availability which limited its usefulness. The 20 long tons 9 cwt (20.8 t) axle load restricted it to the Paddington to Bristol main line, although it was once recorded to have travelled as far west as Newton Abbot. The GWR route availability colour code for The Great Bear was Red.

== Publicity value ==
Although not a technical success, The Great Bear was considered the company's flagship locomotive from its introduction until Churchward's retirement in 1922. With the introduction of 4073 Caerphilly Castle in 1923 with a higher tractive effort, The Great Bear ceased to have any publicity value and became an embarrassment. It was due for heavy repairs in January 1924 and so was withdrawn from service by Churchward's successor Charles Collett. It had run 527,272 miles by this time. Its regular engine driver was Thomas Blackall, originally from Aston Tirrold, Oxfordshire.

== Rebuilding ==
"The front portion of the original frames and the number plates were used again but probably little else". No. 111 emerged as a 4-6-0 in the Castle Class, given the name Viscount Churchill. Thereafter, the GWR did not use the Pacific wheel arrangement. No. 111 was withdrawn in July 1953 and scrapped later that year. One of the original nameplates is in the Science Museum.

== Assessment ==
According to Cecil J. Allen, "The Great Bear was one of the very few locomotive types that Swindon has produced, and in particular among the Churchward designs, to which the word 'failure' could be applied." Authorities differ as to Churchward's attitude to his locomotive. According to Le Fleming, "his dislike of 'The Bear' was well known", but Nock said that he had "a deep affection for the engine", although he came to regard it as "a white elephant" rather than a "Great Bear". He was disappointed to hear of The Great Bear's destruction, and, upon hearing of Nigel Gresley's plans to construct a Pacific for the Great Northern Railway, is said to have replied: "What did that young man want to build it for? We could have sold him ours!"

== See also ==
- GWR Cathedral Class
