= GWR 5800 Class =

Class of steam tank locomotives

GWR 5800 class
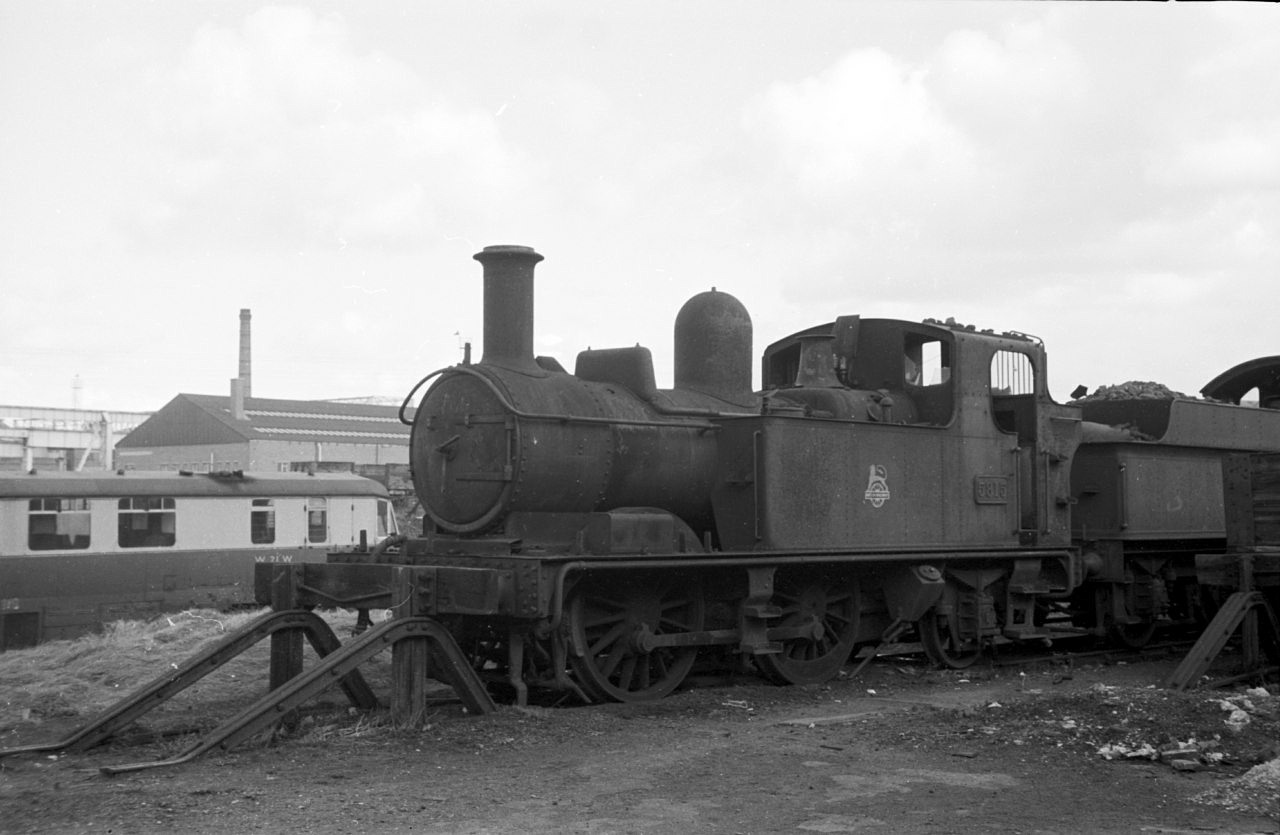
- No. 5815 stored at Swindon after withdrawal 1963
Type and origin
- Power type: Steam
- Designer: Charles Collett
- Builder: Great Western Railway (GWR), Swindon Works
- Order number: Lot 279 (part)
- Build date: 1933
- Total produced: 20
Specifications
- Configuration
  - Whyte: 0-4-2T
  - UIC: B1 n2t
- Gauge: 4 ft 8 1/2 in (1,435 mm) standard gauge
- Driver dia.: 5 ft 2 in (1.575 m)
- Trailing dia.: 3 ft 8 in (1.118 m)
- Wheelbase: 15 ft 6 in (4.72 m)
- Length: 29 ft 11 in (9.12 m)
- Width: 8 ft 7 in (2.616 m)
- Height: 12 ft 6 1/4 in (3.816 m)
- Axle load: 13 long tons 18 cwt (31,100 lb or 14.1 t) (15.6 short tons) full
- Adhesive weight: 27 long tons 8 cwt (61,400 lb or 27.8 t) (30.7 short tons) full
- Loco weight: 41 long tons 6 cwt (92,500 lb or 42 t) (46.3 short tons) full
- Fuel type: Coal
- Fuel capacity: 2 long tons 13 cwt (5,900 lb or 2.7 t) (3.0 short tons)
- Water cap.: 800 imp gal (3,600 L; 960 US gal)
- Firebox
  - Grate area: 12.8 sq ft (1.19 m^{2})
- Boiler: GWR 4800
- Boiler pressure: 165 psi (1.14 MPa)
- Heating surface
  - Firebox: 83.2 sq ft (7.73 m^{2})
  - Tubes: 869.8 sq ft (80.81 m^{2})
- Superheater: None
- Cylinders: Two, inside
- Cylinder size: 16 in × 24 in (406 mm × 610 mm)
- Valve gear: Stephenson
- Valve type: Slide valves
- Train heating: Steam
- Train brakes: Vacuum
Performance figures
- Tractive effort: 13,900 lbf (62 kN)
Career
- Operators: Great Western Railway; British Railways
- Class: 5800
- Power class: GWR: Unclassified, BR: 1P
- Numbers: 5800–5819
- Axle load class: GWR: Unclassified
- Locale: Western Region branch lines
- Withdrawn: 1957–1961
- Disposition: All scrapped

The Great Western Railway (GWR) 5800 Class was a class of twenty 0-4-2T steam tank locomotives. They were built by the GWRs Swindon Works in 1933 and were used for light branch line work. They were similar to the GWR 1400 Class, but lacked the equipment for working autotrains. The last survivor of the class, number 5815, was with withdrawn in 1961. No members of the class were preserved.

== Model form ==
A 5-inch gauge replica of No. 5801 has been built. It works at the Butterley Park Miniature Railway, part of the Swanwick Junction complex.

Dapol have announced O gauge versions to be released in 2018.
