= GWR autocoach =

Type of coach used on the Great Western Railway

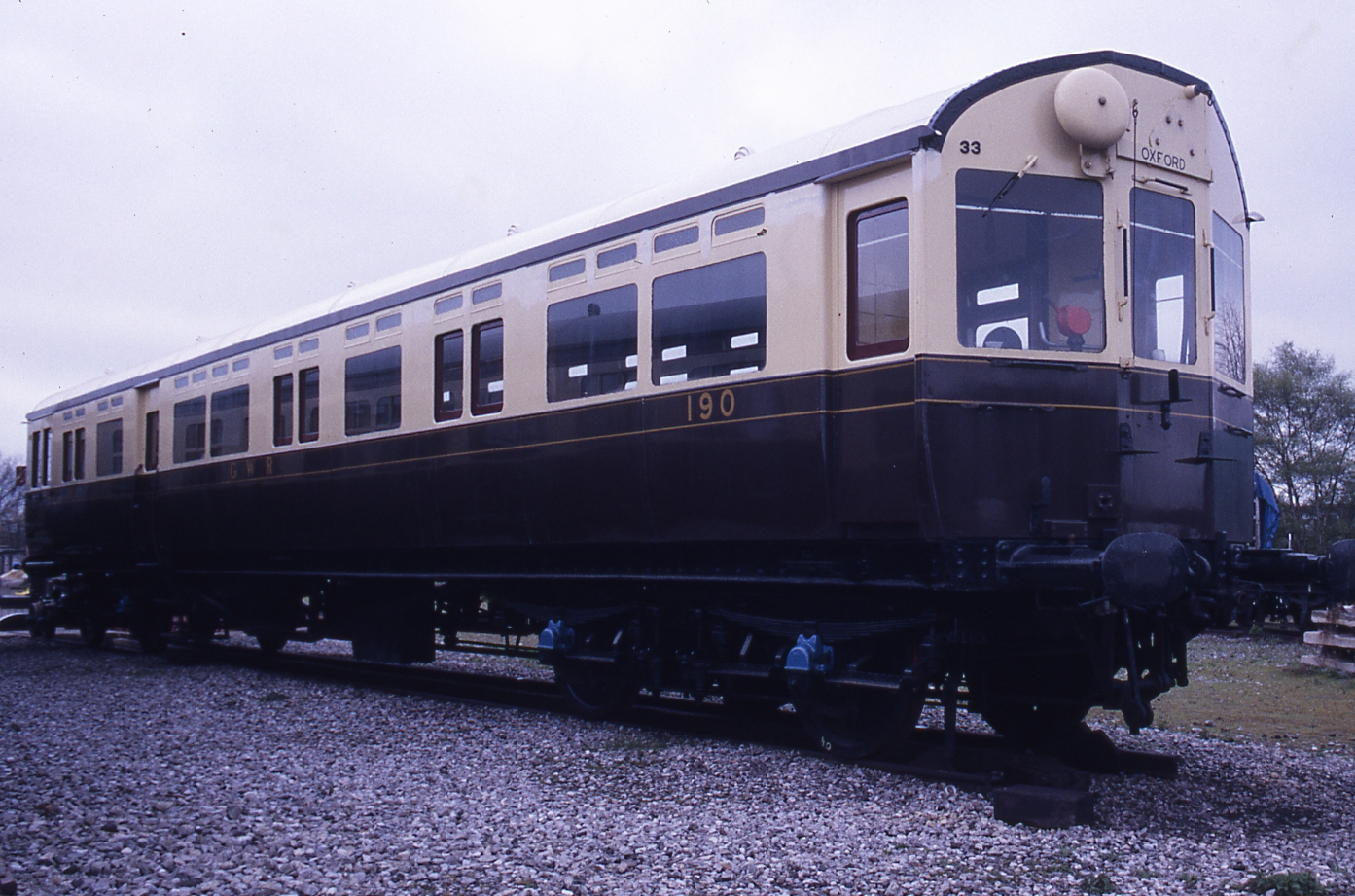
- Autocoach 190 preserved at Didcot Railway Centre
- In service: 1904–1964
- Manufacturer: Swindon Works
- Constructed: 1904–1954
- Number built: 256
- Number preserved: 15
- Number scrapped: 241
- Diagram: A – Z, A1 – A44
- Fleet numbers: 1 – 256
- Operators: Great Western Railway; British Railways

Specifications
- Track gauge: 4 ft 8 1/2 in (1,435 mm)

The GWR autocoach (or auto-trailer) is a type of coach that was used by the Great Western Railway for push-pull trains powered by a steam locomotive. The distinguishing design feature of an autocoach is the driving cab at one end, allowing the driver to control the train without needing to be located in the cab of the steam locomotive. This eliminates the need to run the engine round to the other end of the coach at the end of each journey.

When one or more autocoaches are connected to a suitably equipped steam locomotive, the combination is known as an autotrain, or, historically, a railmotor train. A steam locomotive provided with the equipment to be used as an autotrain is said to be auto-fitted.

The autocoach is the forerunner of the driving trailer used with modern push–pull trains.

== Design features ==
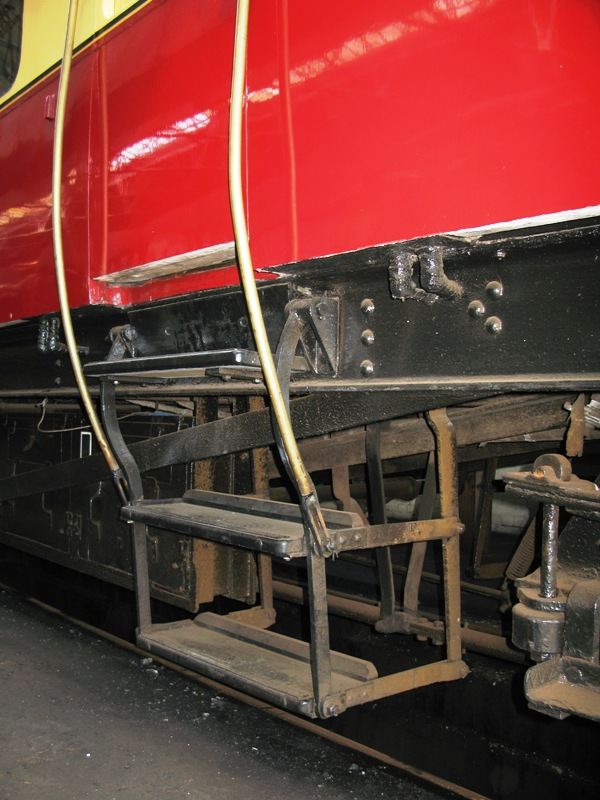
Retractable steps for use at low platforms

A locomotive fitted with additional control equipment is used to power the autotrain. When running 'autocoach first', the regulator is operated by a linkage to a rotating shaft running the length of the locomotive, passing below the cab floor. This engages (via a telescopic coupling) with another shaft running the full length below the floor of the autocoach. This shaft is turned by a second regulator lever in the cab of the autocoach. (See photograph sequence below.) The driver can operate the regulator, brakes and whistle from the far (cab) end of the autocoach; the fireman remains on the locomotive and (in addition to firing) also controls the valve gear settings. The driver can also warn of the train's approach using a large mechanical gong, prominently mounted high on the cab end of the autocoach, which is operated by stamping on a pedal on the floor of the cab. The driver, guard and fireman communicate with each other by an electric bell system.

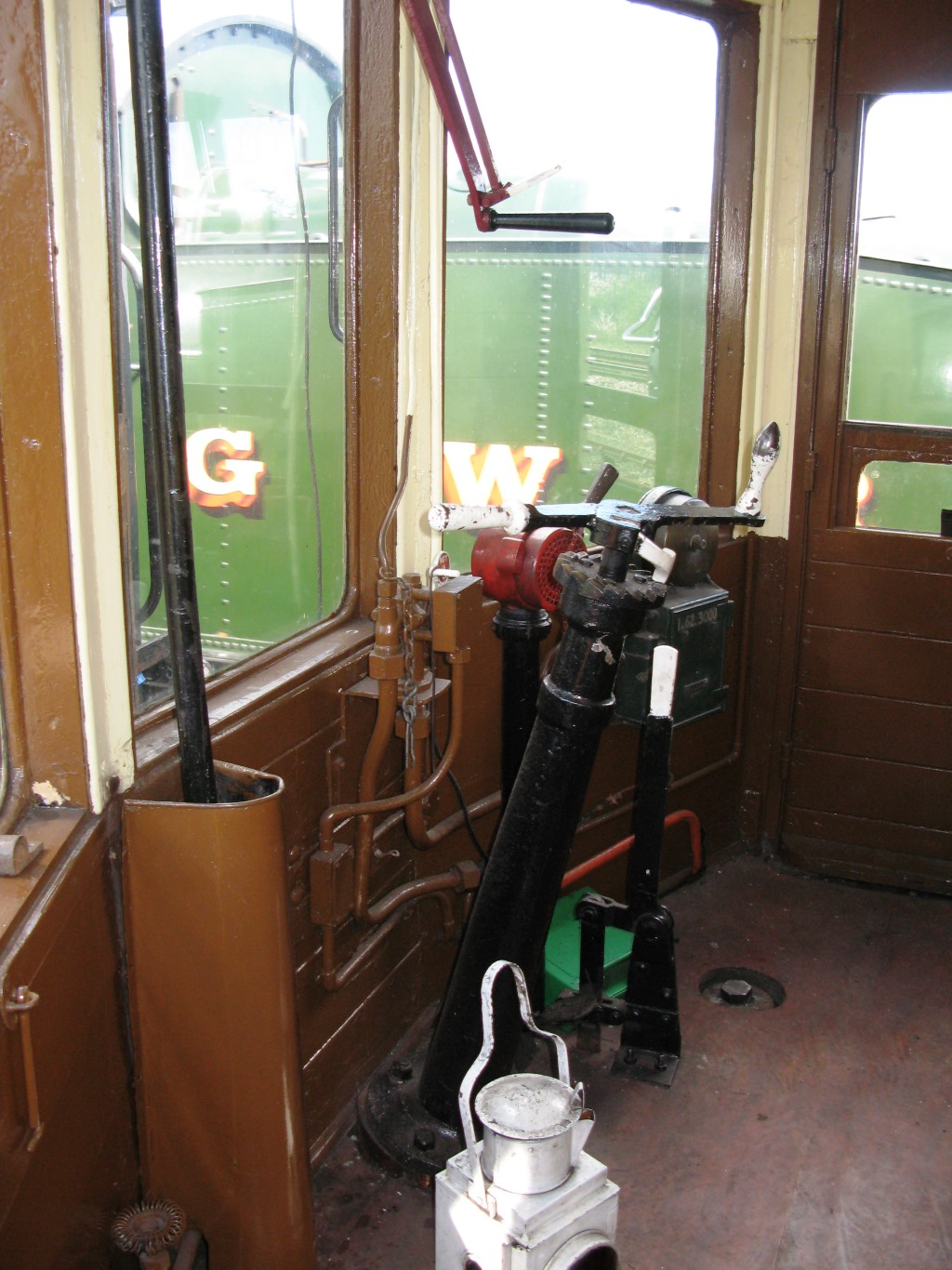
The lever above the cab window moves a vertical rod...

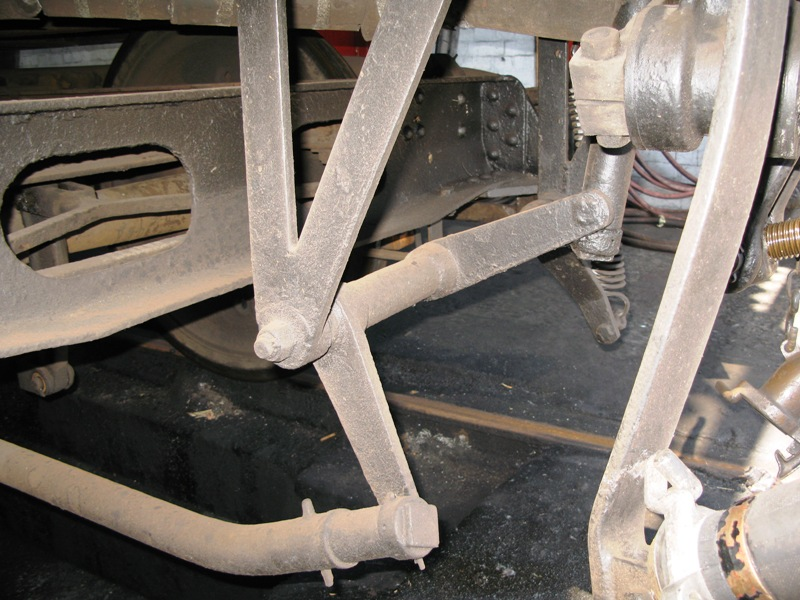
...which rotates the long rod beneath the coach...

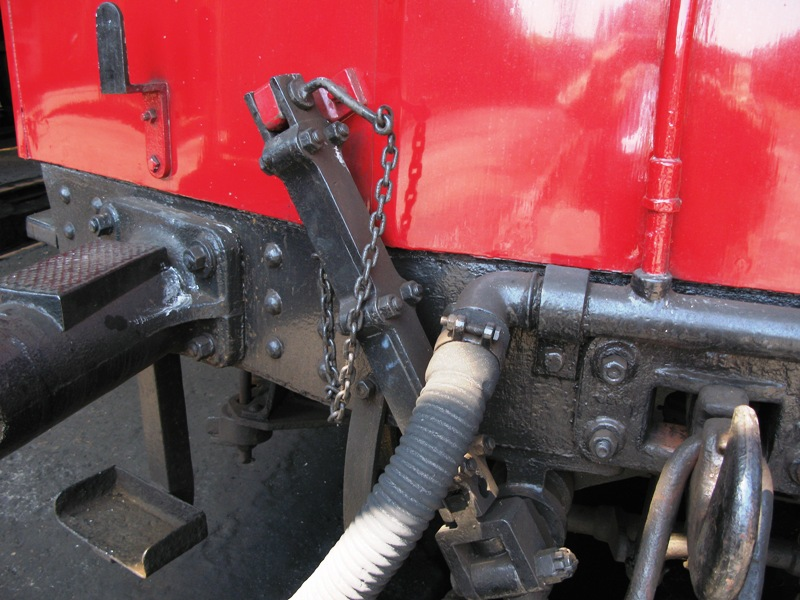
...to turn the flat bar at the back of the coach...

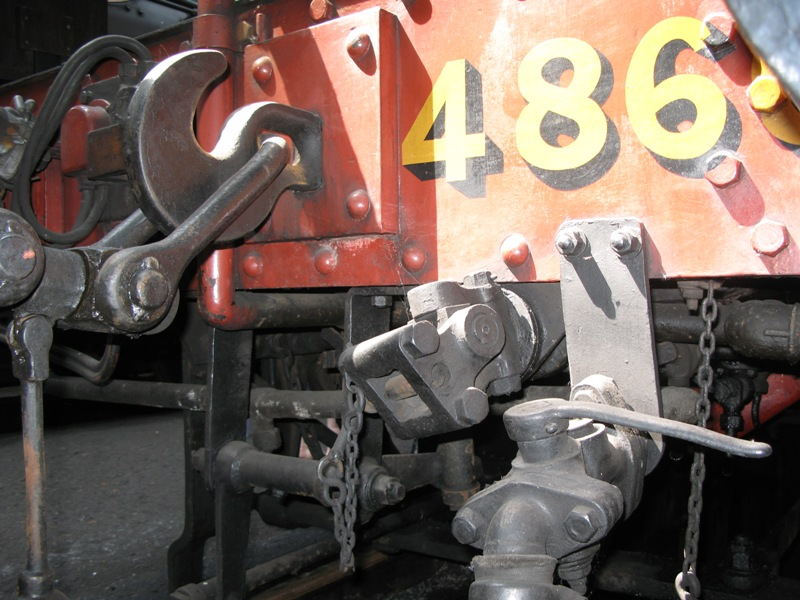
...that engages with the socket on the locomotive to operate the regulator.

== In operation ==
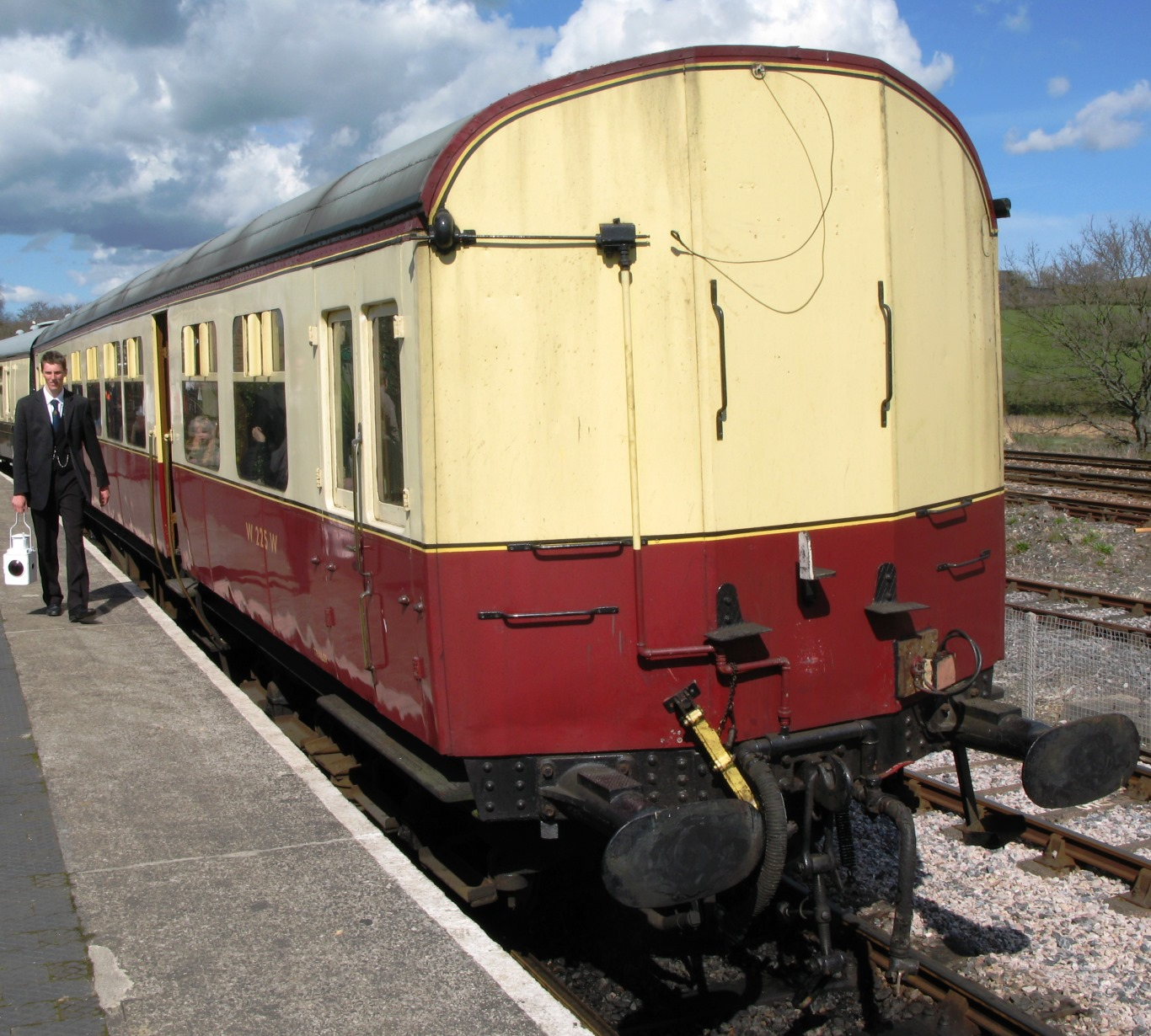
The non-driving end of preserved W225 in British Railways livery on the South Devon Railway

If more than one autocoach was used, the locomotive would usually be marshalled between the coaches, as 'play' in the control linkages could otherwise make operation difficult. This arrangement was not always possible where turntables were not convenient for turning coaches and hence up to two autocoaches could follow or lead a locomotive with cab ends away from the locomotive.

Many GWR suburban services around Plymouth were formed of fixed autotrain formations of four autocoaches, two each side of the locomotive with cabs leading in each direction. When these were introduced in 1906, experiments were made to harmonise the appearance of the locomotive in the middle of the train by cutting down the side tanks and encasing the entire locomotive in a square bodyshell of the same basic design, height and width as the coaches, complete with 'windows' and the same chocolate/cream paint livery. Two 2021 Class and two 517 Class engines were modified in this way.

== Accidents and incidents ==
- On 15 April 1923, carriage No. 70 formed a passenger train hauled by locomotive No. 215. The train was in a head-on collision with a freight train at Curry Rivel, Somerset due to a signalman's error. Nine people were injured.
- On 16 November 1937, an empty train in a siding at the eastern end of Ealing Broadway station (between platforms 2 and 3) was waiting to be called into the platform to form the next service to Denham when the driver started the train in thick fog without noticing that the points were not set for the platform nor that the signals were against him, and the auto-trailer crashed into the signal box. This auto-trailer, no. 211 of Diagram A^{31}, had been converted in August 1935 from steam rail motor no. 81 (Diagram Q^{1}); it was repaired after the accident, and was not withdrawn until March 1959.

== Fleet list ==
Fleet list
Year	Diagram	Lot no.	Fleet no.	Length	Notes	Preserved examples
1904	A	1055	1	59 ft 6 in (18.14 m)		
1904	B	1055	2	70 ft 0 3/4 in (21.36 m)		
1905	B, V, W, X, A4	1081	3–6	70 ft 0 in (21.34 m)		
1905	C	1087	7, 8	59 ft 6 in (18.14 m)		
1905	D, A11, A12	1090	9, 10	70 ft 0 in (21.34 m)		
1905	E, F	1097	11–13	70 ft 0 in (21.34 m)		
1905	G, G1, H	1097	14–17	52 ft 0 3/4 in (15.87 m)		
1906	J, J1	1102	19–24	59 ft 6 in (18.14 m)		
1905	K, K1, Y, A5	1103	25–28	70 ft 0 in (21.34 m)		
1906	L	1108	29–34	70 ft 0 in (21.34 m)		
1906	M, M1, A8	1108	18, 35	54 ft 0 3/4 in (16.48 m)		
1907	N	1126	36–41	59 ft 6 in (18.14 m)		38 at the Telford Steam Railway
1906	L	1127	42–47	70 ft 0 in (21.34 m)		
1907	O, S	1128	48	70 ft 0 in (21.34 m)	Experimental	
1907	P	1130	49–52	70 ft 0 in (21.34 m)		
1908	L	1141	53–58	70 ft 0 in (21.34 m)		
1908	L	1143	59–70	70 ft 0 in (21.34 m)		
1909	Q	1160	71, 72	70 ft 0 in (21.34 m)		
1909	R	1161	73, 74	70 ft 0 in (21.34 m)		
1911	T	1190	75–80	70 ft 0 in (21.34 m)		
1912	U	1198	81–92	70 ft 0 in (21.34 m)		92 at Didcot Railway Centre, used with the steam railmotor
1913	Q	1224	93–95	70 ft 0 in (21.34 m)		
1913	R	1225	96–98	70 ft 0 in (21.34 m)		
1915	Z	—	99–104	59 ft 6 in (18.14 m)	Rebuilt from railmotors 3–8	
1917	A6	—	105, 106	57 ft 0 3/4 in (17.39 m)	Rebuilt from railmotors 1, 2	
1916–19	A7	—	107–112	59 ft 6 in (18.14 m)	Rebuilt from railmotors 9–14	
1919–20	A9	—	113–124	59 ft 6 in (18.14 m)	Rebuilt from railmotors 17–28	
1920–23	A10	—	125, 128–133	59 ft 6 in (18.14 m)	Rebuilt from railmotors 29, 32, 31, 33–36	
1920	A13	—	126	70 ft 0 in (21.34 m)	Rebuilt from railmotor 59	
1920	A14	—	127	70 ft 0 in (21.34 m)	Rebuilt from railmotor 60	
1923	A15	—	136, 137	70 ft 0 in (21.34 m)	Rebuilt from railmotor 46, 47	
1923	A17	—	134	70 ft 0 in (21.34 m)	Rebuilt from railmotor 43	
1923	A18	—	135	70 ft 0 in (21.34 m)	Rebuilt from railmotor 44	
1923	A19	—	138–140	70 ft 0 in (21.34 m)	Rebuilt from railmotors 50–52	
1928	A23	—	146	70 ft 0 in (21.34 m)	Rebuilt from railmotor 38	
1928	A24	—	147	59 ft 6 in (18.14 m)	Rebuilt from railmotor 41	
1928	A25	—	148	70 ft 0 in (21.34 m)	Rebuilt from railmotor 45	
1928	A26	—	149	70 ft 0 in (21.34 m)	Rebuilt from railmotor 57	
1928	A29	—	150–153	70 ft 0 in (21.34 m)	Rebuilt from railmotors 61, 63, 67, 68	
1928	A26	—	154–157	70 ft 0 in (21.34 m)	Rebuilt from railmotor 85, 87, 89, 90	
1928	A26	—	158	70 ft 0 in (21.34 m)	Rebuilt from railmotor 99	
1929	A27	1394	159–170	59 ft 6 in (18.14 m)		163 at the South Devon Railway; 167 at the Chinnor & Princes Risborough Railway; 169 at the West Somerset Railway
1930	A28	1410	171–180	62 ft 8 in (19.10 m)		174 at the Llangollen Railway; 178 at the Severn Valley Railway
1930	A26	1432	181–185	70 ft 0 in (21.34 m)	Rebuilt from railmotors 54, 56, 84, 95, 94	
1930	A29	1432	186	70 ft 0 in (21.34 m)	Rebuilt from railmotor 62	
1933	A33	1480	187–196	62 ft 8 in (19.10 m)		190 at the Didcot Railway Centre
1934	A23	1511	197, 198	70 ft 0 in (21.34 m)	Rebuilt from railmotors 39, 40	
1934	A26	1511	199, 200, 206	70 ft 0 in (21.34 m)	Rebuilt from railmotors 53, 58, 86	
1934	A29	1511	201	70 ft 0 in (21.34 m)	Rebuilt from railmotor 69	
1934	A31	1511	202–205	59 ft 6 in (18.14 m)	Rebuilt from railmotors 73, 74, 82, 83	
1935	A31	1521	207–209	59 ft 6 in (18.14 m)	Rebuilt from railmotors 75, 78, 79	
1936	A26	1542	210, 212–215	70 ft 0 in (21.34 m)	Rebuilt from railmotors 91, 93, 96–98	212 restored as a steam railmotor at the Didcot Railway Centre
1936	A31	1542	211	59 ft 6 in (18.14 m)	Rebuilt from railmotor 81	
1936	A29	1545	216–218	70 ft 0 in (21.34 m)	Rebuilt from railmotors 64, 66, 72	
1936	A31	1542	219	59 ft 6 in (18.14 m)	Rebuilt from railmotor 76	
1938	A34	1600	1668–1671	57 ft 0 in (17.37 m)	Auto-fitted Brake Thirds	
1951	A38	1736	222–234	64 ft 0 in (19.51 m)	232 was modified as a first class saloon on the Dartmouth Steam Railway; 233 was modified as a test coach by British Rail (see below)	225, 228 and 233 at the South Devon Railway; 231 at the Didcot Railway Centre; 232 at the Bodmin and Wenford Railway
1951	A39	1736	220	64 ft 0 in (19.51 m)		
1951	A40	1736	221	64 ft 0 in (19.51 m)		
1953	A43	1766	235–244	64 ft 0 in (19.51 m)		238 Chaffinch on the Severn Valley Railway; 240 on the South Devon Railway
1953	A44	—	245–256		Rebuilt from Brake Thirds 5491/95, 4015/16/05/19, 4343, 5871, 4358, 5875, 4351/45	

== Auto-fitted locomotives ==
Several Great Western locomotive classes included examples equipped to work in autotrains at different times. These included:

Type	Total auto-fitted	Introduced	Preserved examples	Comments
455 Class 2-4-0T	About 40	1869	–	Some fitted with auto gear after 1905
517 Class 0-4-2T	86	1868	–	Some fitted with auto gear after 1905
645 Class 0-6-0PT	1	1872	-	No. 1522 fitted in April 1931; withdrawn November 1937
1076 Class 0-6-0ST/PT	21	1870	–	Some fitted with auto gear after 1905
1854 Class 0-6-0PT	1	1890	-	No. 1728 auto-fitted at some point in the 1920s; withdrawn February 1932
2021 Class 0-6-0ST/PT	27	1897	-	Some fitted with auto gear after 1905
4575 Class 2-6-2T	15	1927	5572	Certain locomotives of this class fitted with auto gear in 1953
4800 Class 0-4-2T	75	1932	1420, 1442, 1450, 1466	Auto-fitted version of 5800 Class later renumbered as 1400 Class
5400 Class 0-6-0PT	25	1930	–	All auto-fitted
6400 Class 0-6-0PT	40	1932	6412, 6430, 6435	Smaller wheel version of 5400 Class, all auto-fitted
