= GWR 2251 Class =

British steam locomotive class (1930–1965)

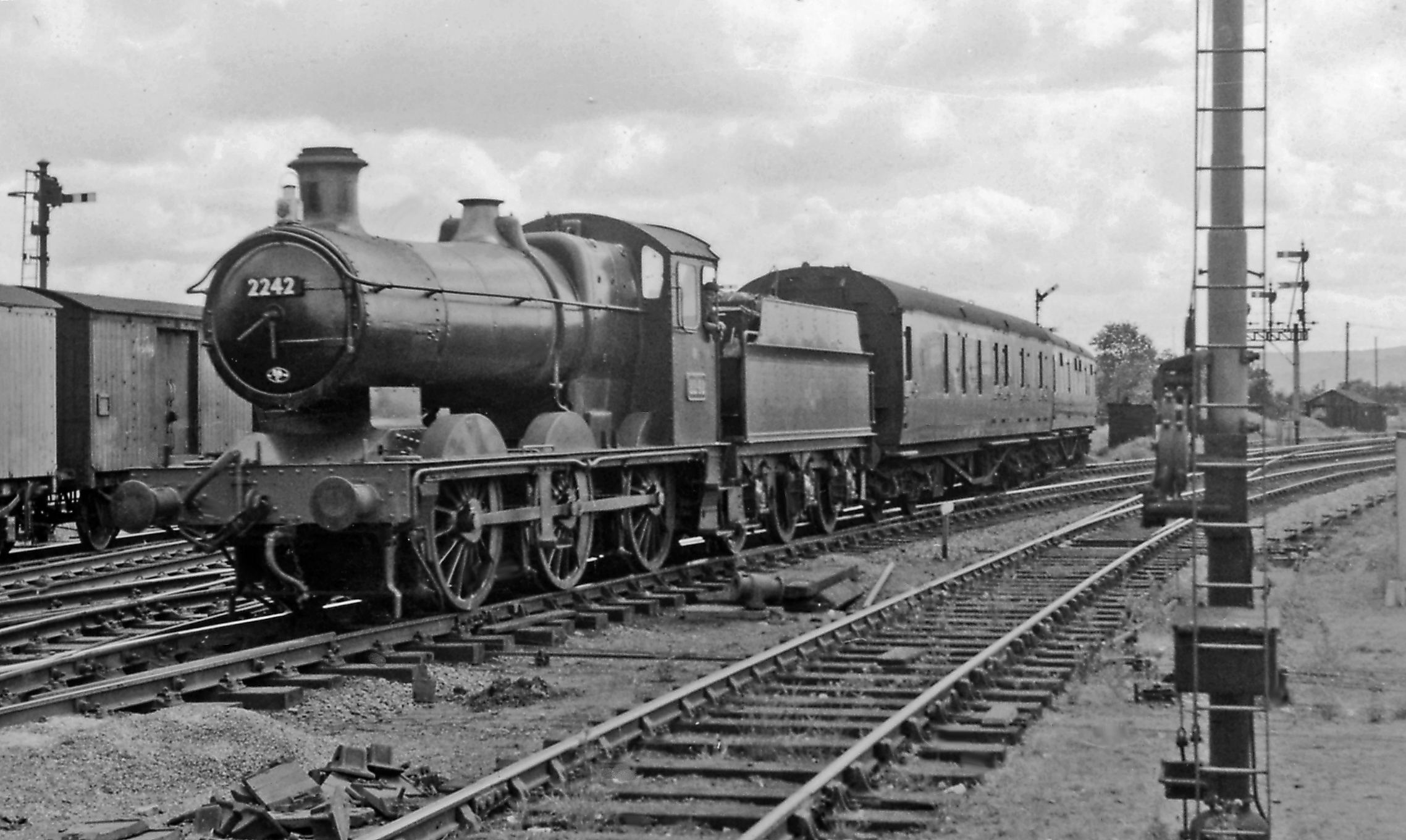
- 2242 at Tramway Junction, Gloucester in 1962
Type and origin
- Power type: Steam
- Designer: Charles Collett
- Builder: GWR Swindon Works
- Order number: Lots 261, 283, 298, 312, 322, 337, 347, 360
- Build date: 1930–1948
- Total produced: 120
Specifications
- Configuration
  - Whyte: 0-6-0
  - UIC: C h2
- Gauge: 4 ft 8 1/2 in (1,435 mm) standard gauge
- Driver dia.: 5 ft 2 in (1.575 m)
- Minimum curve: 4 1/2 chains (297 ft; 91 m) normal, 4 chains (264 ft; 80 m) slow
- Length: 53 ft 8 1/4 in (16.36 m)
- Width: 8 ft 5 in (2.565 m)
- Height: 12 ft 8 7/16 in (3.872 m)
- Axle load: 15 long tons 15 cwt (35,300 lb or 16 t) (17.6 short tons) full
- Loco weight: 43 long tons 8 cwt (97,200 lb or 44.1 t) (48.6 short tons) full
- Tender weight: 36 long tons 15 cwt (82,300 lb or 37.3 t) (41.2 short tons) full
- Fuel type: Coal
- Fuel capacity: 5 long tons 0 cwt (11,200 lb or 5.1 t) (5.6 short tons)
- Water cap.: 3,000 imp gal (14,000 L; 3,600 US gal)
- Firebox
  - Grate area: 17.40 sq ft (1.617 m^{2})
- Boiler: GWR Standard No. 10
- Boiler pressure: 200 lbf/in^{2} (1.38 MPa)
- Heating surface
  - Firebox: 102 sq ft (9.5 m^{2})/
  - Tubes: 1,069 sq ft (99.3 m^{2})
- Superheater
  - Type: 4-element or 6-element
  - Heating area: 4-element: 52.98 sq ft (4.922 m^{2}), 6-element: 70.00 sq ft (6.503 m^{2})
- Cylinders: Two, inside
- Cylinder size: 17 1/2 in × 24 in (444 mm × 610 mm)
Performance figures
- Tractive effort: 20,155 lbf (89.65 kN)
Career
- Operators: GWR » BR
- Power class: GWR: B, BR: 3MT
- Numbers: 2251–2299, 2200–2250, 3200–3219
- Axle load class: Yellow
- Withdrawn: 1958–1965
- Disposition: One preserved, remainder scrapped

The Great Western Railway (GWR) 2251 Class or Collett Goods Class was a class of 0-6-0 type steam tender locomotives designed for medium-powered freight. They were introduced in 1930 as a replacement for the earlier Dean Goods 0-6-0s and were built up to 1948.

== Overview ==
In many ways, the 2251s were modernised Dean Goods, sharing the main dimensions, but having more modern features such as taper boilers and full cabs. Increases in both boiler pressure and heating surface gave a useful increase in power at the expense of weight that restricted permitted routes. Numbers 2211–2230, built in 1940 did not have side windows. Designed by Charles Collett for medium freight and passenger duties they had 5 ft 2 in (1.575 m) driving wheels. Carrying a maximum of 3,000 imperial gallons (14,000 L; 3,600 US gal) of water for a boiler operating at 200 psi (1.4 MPa), they developed 20,155 lbf (89.65 kN) of tractive effort. They could be found operating on most parts of the former GWR system. These were the first GWR 0-6-0 to use the standard number 10 boiler as later fitted to the 94xx, 15xx and various rebuilds of absorbed mainly Welsh locomotives.

Table of orders and numbers
Year	Quantity	Lot No.	Locomotive numbers
1930	20	261	2251–2270
1934	10	283	2271–2280
1936	10	298	2281–2290
1938	10	312	2291–2299, 2200
1939	10	322	2201–2210
1940	20	337	2211–2230
1944–45	20	347	2231–2250
1946–48	20	360	3200–3219

No. 3217, delivered December 1947, was the last locomotive built by the GWR. Nos. 3218 and 3219 were delivered in January 1948, the first locomotives built at Swindon for British Railways.

They were withdrawn between 1958 and 1965.

== Preservation ==
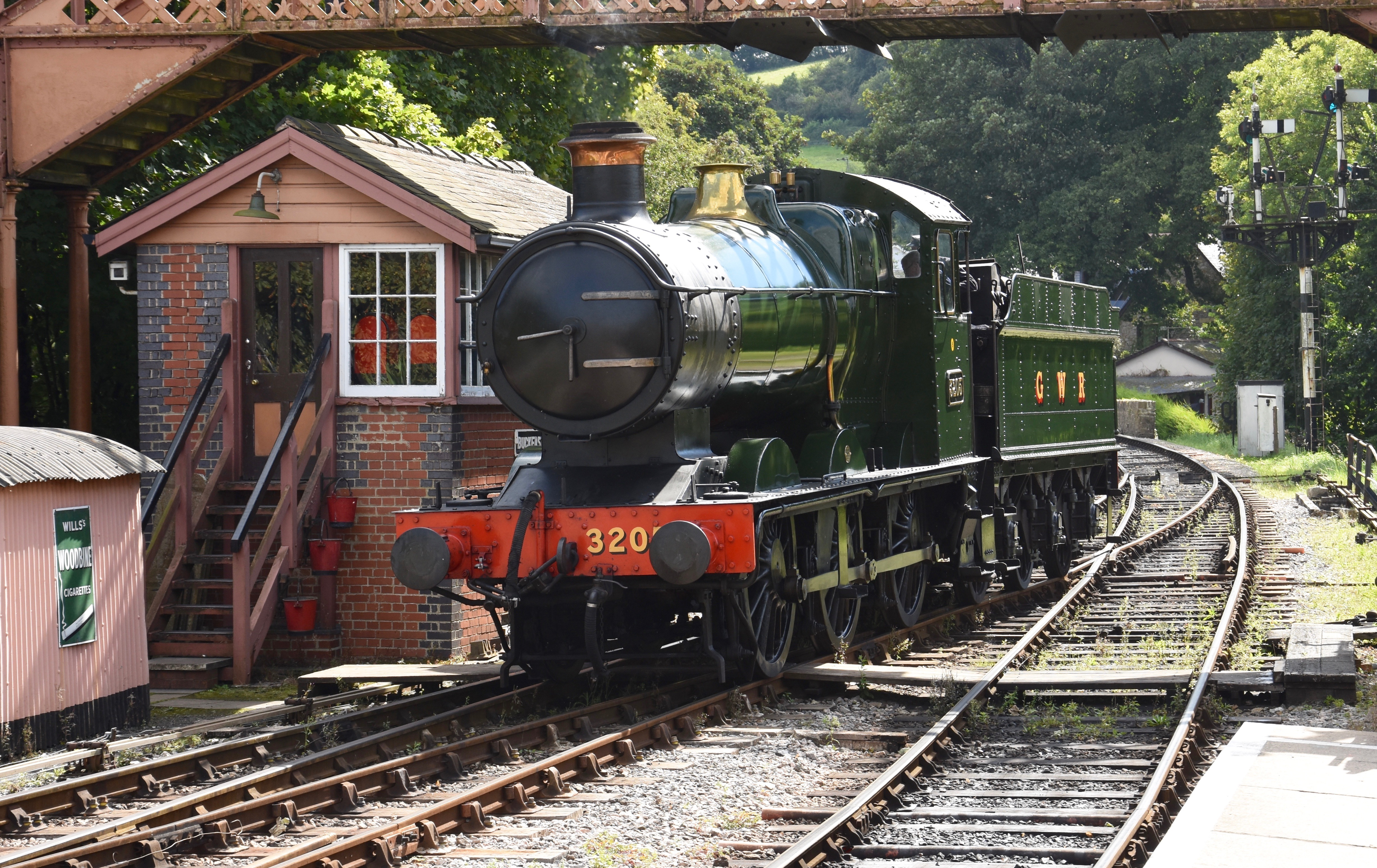
Preserved 3205 on the South Devon Railway.

One, 3205, has been preserved and is located on the South Devon Railway in Devon. While the engine has spent most of its preserved life running on heritage railways including the Severn Valley Railway, West Somerset Railway & then the Dart Valley Railway (before renaming to the SDR). For a very brief one-off appearance the engine made a mainline appearance at the Rocket 150 celebrations in 1980. The engine arrived at the event and then later departed for home under its own power.

As of 2022 the engine is stored awaiting an overhaul following early withdrawal in 2017, the ticket having expired in 2020.

== Models ==
Bachmann Branchline manufactures models of the 2251 in OO gauge. Mainline (Palitoy) released the first ready-to-run OO model in 1978. The Bachmann model was released in 1996. It is based on the Mainline model with revised body tooling to complement a completely new chassis design that allows the boiler backhead to be modelled.

In British N gauge, the first model was the Langley whitemetal kit, designed to fit the Graham Farish 94xx/general purpose tank chassis. The next was the Peco ready-to-run model, introduced in 2007. This was a big step forward, and had DCC fitted as standard. Production of these stopped around 2010. The next model of the class was made by Union Mills, released in 2017.

In 3mm/TT scale, BEC produced a whitemetal kit body for the Tri-ang LMS Fowler Class 3F chassis, though this is long discontinued.
