= GWR 1101 Class =

Class of dock shunting locomotives

- Gwr 1101 As Built
Type and origin
- Power type: Steam
- Designer: Charles Collett
- Builder: Avonside Engine Company
- Order number: GWR lot 246
- Serial number: 1987–1992
- Build date: 1926
- Total produced: 6
Specifications
- Configuration
  - Whyte: 0-4-0T
  - UIC: B n2t
- Gauge: 4 ft 8 1/2 in (1,435 mm) standard gauge
- Driver dia.: 3 ft 9 1/2 in (1.156 m)
- Wheelbase: 6 ft 6 in (1.98 m)
- Length: 25 ft 5 1/2 in (7.76 m) over buffers
- Width: 8 ft 8 in (2.642 m)
- Height: 11 ft 10 in (3.607 m)
- Axle load: 19 long tons 8 cwt (43,500 lb or 19.7 t) (21.7 short tons) full
- Loco weight: 38 long tons 4 cwt (85,600 lb or 38.8 t) (42.8 short tons) full
- Fuel type: Coal
- Water cap.: 1,000 imp gal (4,500 L; 1,200 US gal)
- Firebox
  - Grate area: 12.5 sq ft (1.16 m^{2})
- Boiler pressure: 170 lbf/in^{2} (1.17 MPa)
- Heating surface
  - Firebox: 76 sq ft (7.1 m^{2})
  - Tubes: 788 sq ft (73.2 m^{2})
  - Total surface: 864 sq ft (80.3 m^{2})
- Cylinders: Two, outside
- Cylinder size: 16 in × 24 in (406 mm × 610 mm)
Performance figures
- Tractive effort: 19,510 lbf (86.8 kN)
Career
- Operators: GWR » BR
- Power class: GWR: B
- Numbers: 1101–1106
- Axle load class: GWR: Red
- Withdrawn: 1959–1960
- Disposition: All scrapped

The GWR 1101 Class was a class of 0-4-0T side tank steam locomotives built by the Avonside Engine Company to the order of the Great Western Railway in 1926 as dock shunters.

== British Railways and withdrawal ==
They passed into British Railways ownership in 1948 and were numbered 1101–1106. All were withdrawn and scrapped between 1959 and 1960.

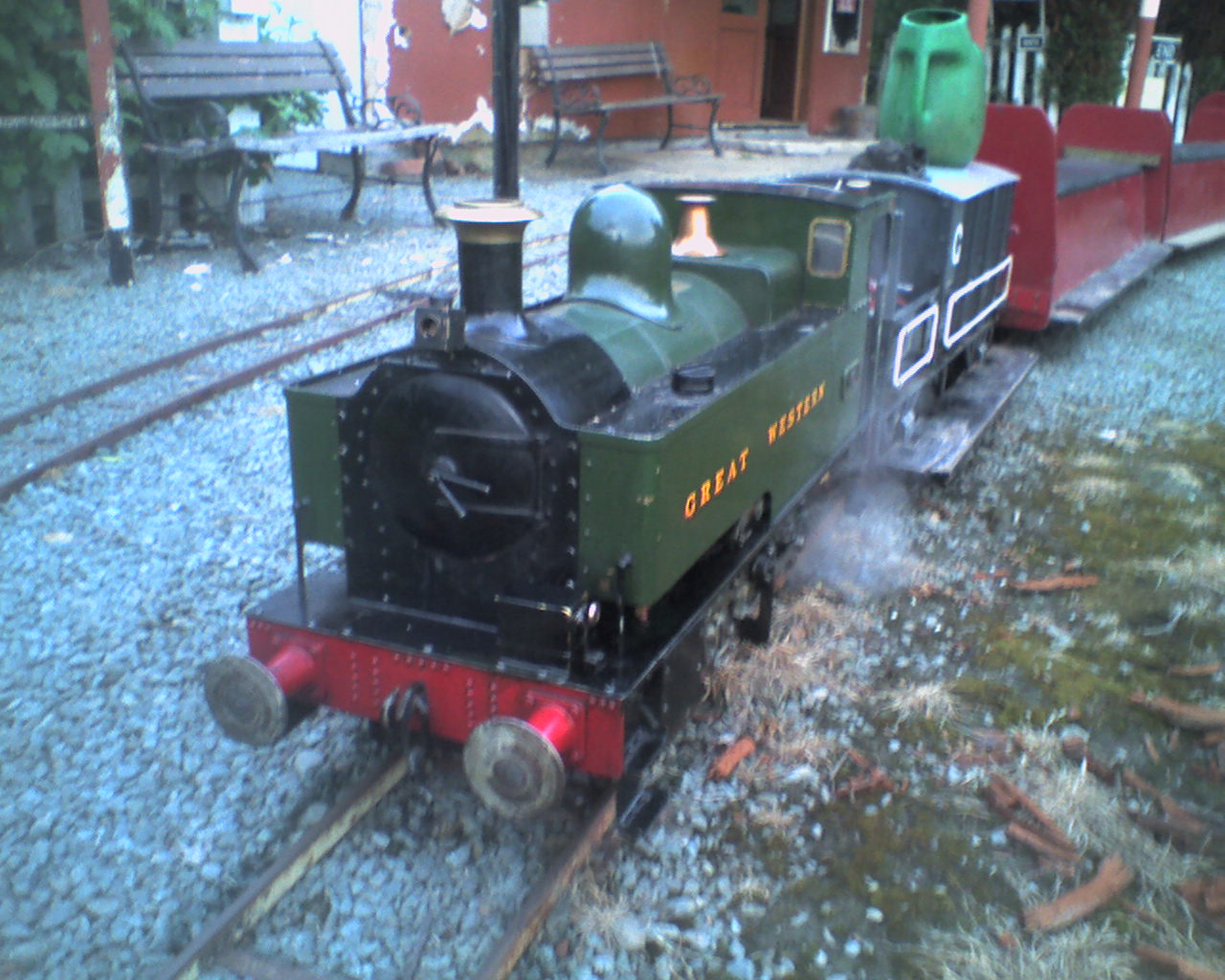
A 7 1/4 in (184 mm) gauge GWR 1101 class loco

== Sources ==
- Ian Allan ABC of British Railways Locomotives, winter 1957/8 edition, part 1, page 24
- Whitehurst, Brian (1973). Great Western Engines, Names, Numbers, Types and Classes (1940 to Preservation). Oxford, UK: Oxford Publishing Company. pp. 17, 102, 142. ISBN 978-0-9028-8821-0. OCLC 815661.
