= GWR 1400 Class =

British 0-4-2T steam locomotive class

GWR 4800 class (later 1400 class)
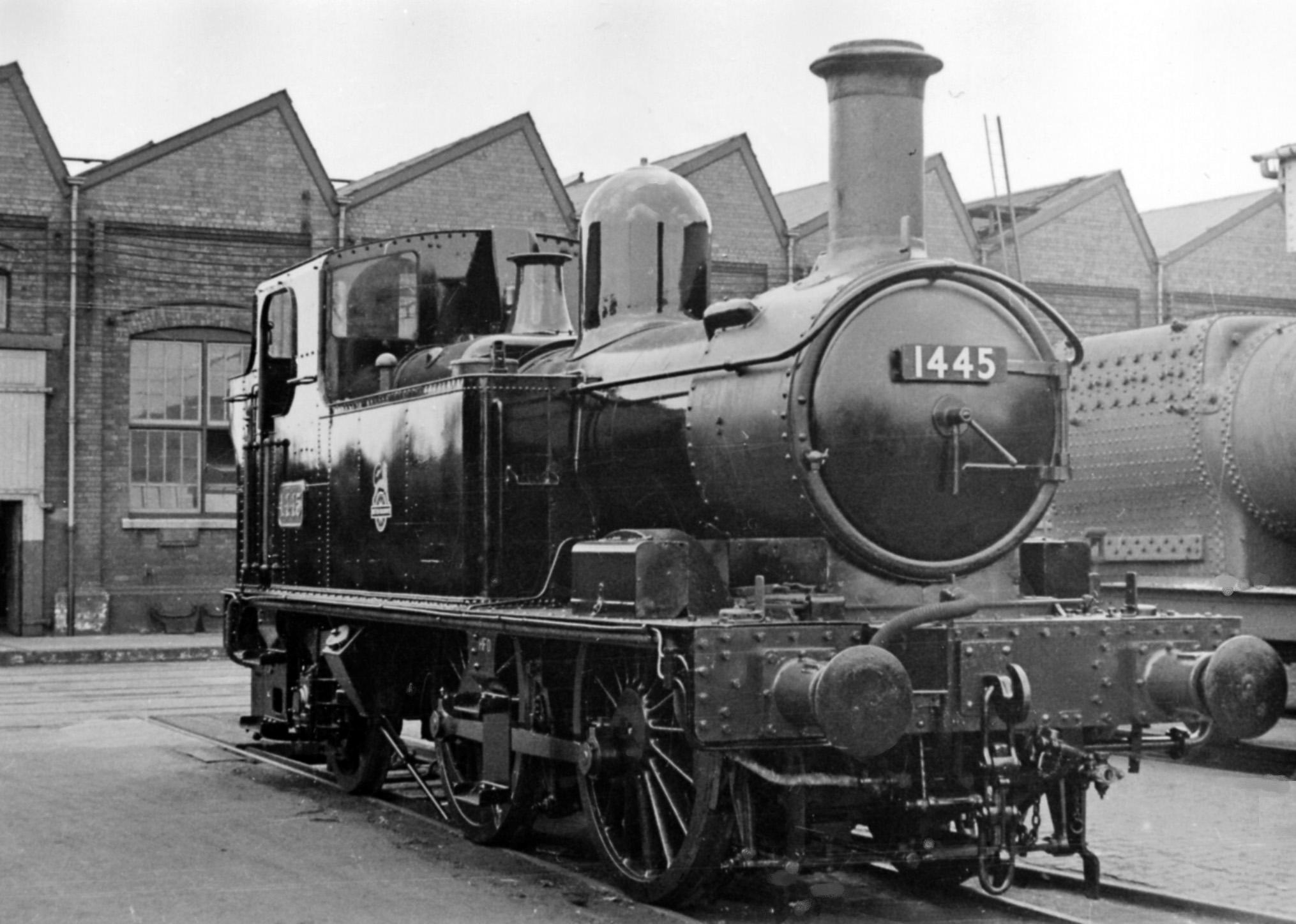
- 1445 freshly painted at Swindon Works in 1950
Type and origin
- Power type: Steam
- Designer: Charles Collett
- Builder: Great Western Railway, Swindon Works
- Order number: Lots 279, 287, 288
- Build date: 1932–1936
- Total produced: 75
Specifications
- Configuration
  - Whyte: 0-4-2T
  - UIC: B1 n2t
- Gauge: 4 ft 8 1/2 in (1,435 mm) standard gauge
- Driver dia.: 5 ft 2 in (1.575 m)
- Trailing dia.: 3 ft 8 in (1.118 m)
- Wheelbase: 15 ft 6 in (4.72 m)
- Length: 29 ft 11 in (9.12 m)
- Width: 8 ft 7 in (2.616 m)
- Height: 12 ft 6 1/4 in (3.816 m)
- Axle load: 13 long tons 18 cwt (31,100 lb or 14.1 t) (15.6 short tons) full
- Adhesive weight: 27 long tons 8 cwt (61,400 lb or 27.8 t) (30.7 short tons) full
- Loco weight: 41 long tons 6 cwt (92,500 lb or 42 t) (46.3 short tons) full
- Fuel type: Coal
- Fuel capacity: 2 long tons 13 cwt (5,900 lb or 2.7 t) (3.0 short tons)
- Water cap.: 800 imp gal (3,600 L; 960 US gal)
- Firebox
  - Grate area: 12.8 sq ft (1.19 m^{2})
- Boiler: GWR 4800
- Boiler pressure: 165 psi (1.14 MPa)
- Heating surface
  - Firebox: 83.2 sq ft (7.73 m^{2})
  - Tubes: 869.8 sq ft (80.81 m^{2})
- Superheater: None
- Cylinders: Two, inside
- Cylinder size: 16 in × 24 in (406 mm × 610 mm)
- Valve gear: Stephenson
- Valve type: Slide valves
- Train heating: Steam
- Train brakes: Vacuum
Performance figures
- Tractive effort: 13,900 lbf (62 kN)
Career
- Operators: Great Western Railway; British Railways
- Class: 4800, later 1400
- Power class: GWR: Unclassified, BR: 1P
- Numbers: 4800–4874, later 1400–1474
- Axle load class: GWR: Unclassified
- Locale: Western Region branch lines
- Withdrawn: 1956–1965
- Preserved: 1420, 1442, 1450, 1466
- Disposition: Four preserved, remainder scrapped

The GWR 1400 Class is a class of steam locomotive designed by the Great Western Railway for branch line passenger work. It was originally classified as the 4800 Class when introduced in 1932, and renumbered in 1946.

Although credited to Charles Collett, the design dated back to 1868 with the introduction of the George Armstrong 517 class.

== Precursors ==
Like the 48xx/14xx, the 517 Class was a lightweight loco for branchline work; it was built at Wolverhampton railway works between 1868 and 1885.

In this period evolutionary changes included:

- 517-570 – with 13 ft 7 in (4.14 m) wheelbase, inside bearings to trailing wheels, and saddle tanks built 1868-1869.
- 571-576 – with 13 ft 7 in (4.14 m) wheelbase, outside bearings and side tanks built 1869-1870
- 826-836, 838-849, 1154–1165, 202-05, 215-222, 1421–1432, 1433–1444, 1465-1482 – all with 15 ft 0 in (4.57 m) wheelbase with side tanks built 1873-1883
- 1483-1488 – with 15 ft 6 in (4.72 m) wheelbase and side tanks built 1884-1885

Later gradual changes included Belpaire fireboxes, boilers rated at 165 psi (1.14 MPa) as opposed to 150 psi (1.0 MPa), full cabs, extended bunkers and the progressive conversion of short wheelbase locos to 15 ft 0 in (4.57 m) or 15 ft 6 in (4.72 m). From 1924 onwards, several were converted to run with an autocoach, and in this configuration were the direct ancestors of the 48xx class.

In this form, the updated 517s were but a small step away from the 48xx. The wheelbase was still 15 ft 6 in (4.72 m), the boiler still rated at only 165 psi (1.14 MPa), and the wheels 5 ft 2 in (1,575 mm) and 3 ft 8 in (1,118 mm). New was the Collett-style cab and bunker and the boiler nominally to a new design. A three bar crosshead was added to the motion. This was a 1924 innovation introduced with the GWR 5600 Class and also seen in the 1930s-built 5400, 6400 and 7400 classes of pannier tanks.

== Into service ==
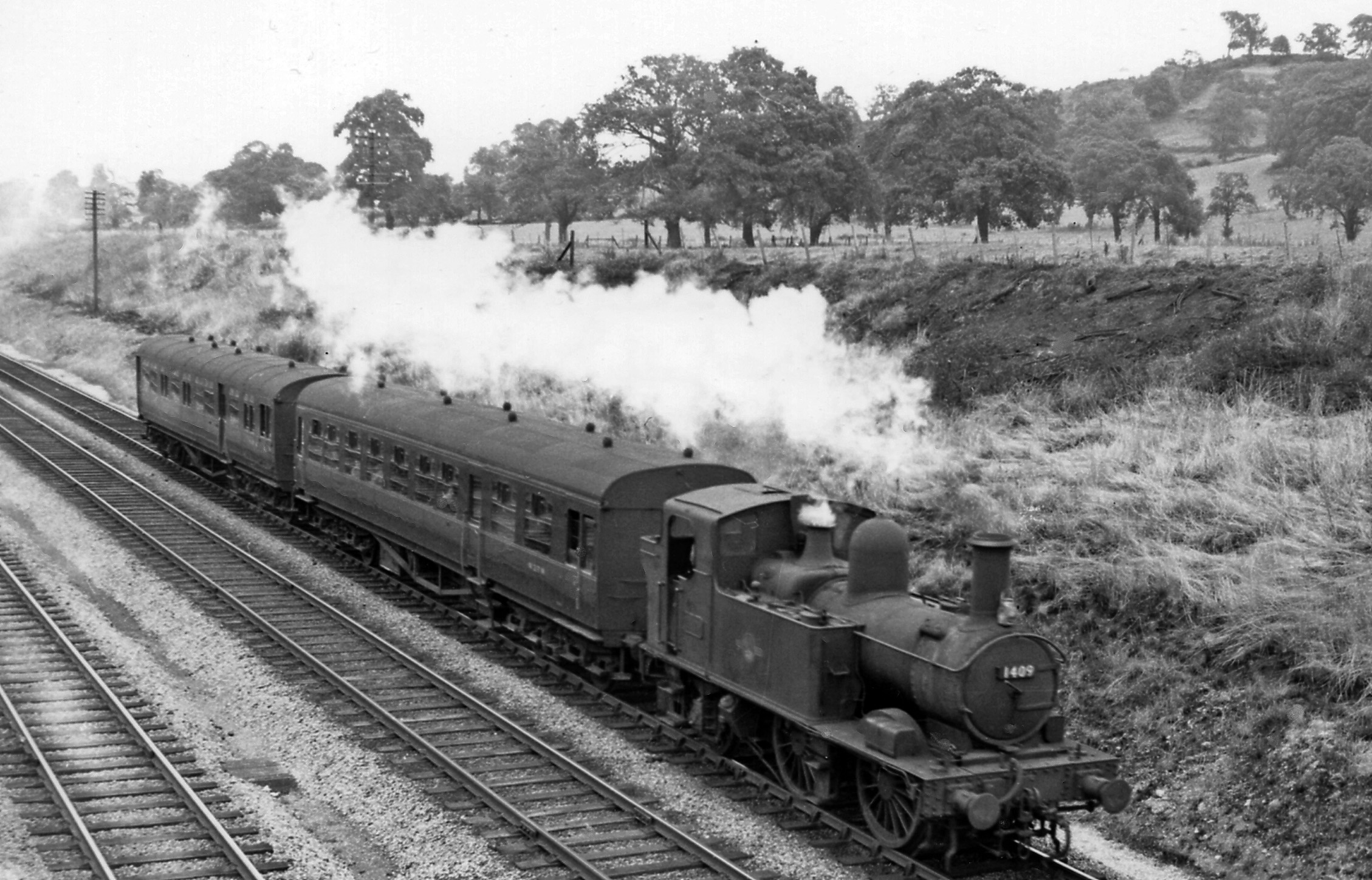
1409 heading an autotrain up the Golden Valley to Chalford in 1961

The 4800 Class was designed as a more modern version of the 517 Class, which were by then beginning to show their relative age. The first locomotive, No 4800, was built by Swindon Works and entered service in 1932, with a further seventy-four engines of this type following up to 1936. During this period, Swindon also built twenty 5800 Class engines, which were broadly similar, but which were not fitted with autotrain equipment or the Swindon top feed as later fitted to a number of 4800 class engines.

The 4800 Class locomotives retained their original numbers until the GWR decided to experimentally convert twelve 2800 Class 2-8-0s for oil-firing. It was decided that the converted engines would be reclassified as the 4800 Class and so the 75 tank locomotives already carrying this designation were reclassified as the 1400 Class with running numbers 1400-1474. The engines did not revert to their original classification after the experiment ended in 1948. They could reach a maximum speed of 80 mph (130 km/h) which was much faster than the diesel railcars designed to replace them could reach.

During the 1953 production of the Ealing comedy The Titfield Thunderbolt, 14xx locomotives Nos. 1401 and 1456 (doubling as 1401) were specially assigned to the film shoot, which took place primarily in the Limpley Stoke area. For this, the locomotives were temporarily allocated to Westbury locomotive depot.

The 1400 Class was designed to work with the GWR design of autocoach, a specialist vehicle with driving controls designed for push-pull working and which could also be used with similarly equipped engines such as the 517 Class, and the 5400, 6400 and the older 2021 classes. This lack of auto gear was the cause of earlier scrapping of the 5800 Class as there was no work for them. The last, no. 5815, was withdrawn from Swindon shed in April 1961.

The auto-fitted locos fared little better; scrapping commenced in 1956 and all were withdrawn by early 1965. Nos. 1442 and 1450 were withdrawn from Exmouth Junction shed in May 1965. By the early 1960s several had been in store (parked in an out-of-the-way siding with a tarpaulin over the chimney) for some time, being occasionally steamed to replace failed diesels.

Table of orders and numbers
Year	Quantity	Lot No.	Locomotive numbers	Notes
1932–33	30	279	4800–4829	renumbered 1400–1429 in 1946
1934–35	30	288	4830–4859	renumbered 1430–1459 in 1946
1936	15	287	4860–4874	renumbered 1460–1474 in 1946

== Preservation ==
Four examples have been preserved, all late withdrawals from service in the 1963-1965 period. All went direct to preservation from British Railways in relatively good condition.

Loco numbers in bold mean their current number.

Number		Built	Withdrawn	Service Life	Location	Owners	Livery	Condition	Mainline Certified	Photograph	Notes
GWR	GWR (1946)	Built	Withdrawn	Service Life	Location	Owners	Livery	Condition	Mainline Certified	Photograph	Notes
4820	**1420**	Nov. 1933	Nov. 1964	31 Years	South Devon Railway	South Devon Railway Association	GWR Green	Undergoing overhaul	No		Has carried the name Bulliver in preservation; "Bulliver" was the local name given to the Ashburton branch line train (which used the route of the present South Devon Railway).
4842	**1442**	Apr. 1935	May 1965	30 Years, 1 month	Tiverton, Devon	Tiverton Museum	GWR Green	Static exhibit	No		Was displayed in the open air at Blundell's Road until 1978 when it was moved to its present location.
4850	**1450**	Jul. 1935	May 1965	29 Years, 10 months	Severn Valley Railway	Privately owned	BR unlined green	Operational	Formerly		Formerly owned by the Dart Valley (later South Devon) Railway. In 1991 it was sold to present owner Mike Little who formed Pull Push Ltd. to manage its operation. Has resided on the SVR since 2014 when it was moved from the Dean Forest Railway.
4866	**1466**	Feb. 1936	Dec. 1963	27 Years, 10 months	Didcot Railway Centre	Great Western Society	BR Black	Operational	No		Was the first example to be preserved, being sold to the GWS for £750 in April 1964.

1442 spent its last years working between Tiverton and Tiverton Junction and became known as Tivvy Bumper. It was purchased by Lord Amory in 1965 for display at Tiverton. All preserved examples apart from 1442 are fitted with auto train equipment, and 1450 has also operated on the mainline in preservation, but due to its size was restricted in the amount of work it could do and was also restricted on mileage, as the 1400s only have a max water capacity of 800 imp gal (3,600 L; 960 US gal). During the 1990s it worked a number of Dawlish Donkey trips from Exeter St Davids to Newton Abbot.

== Models ==
- DJmodels produced models of the 14xx, 58xx and 48xx class locomotives in 00 gauge in 2018.
- Dapol released a version of the 14xx in O gauge in early 2020.
