= GWR 4073 Class 5080 Defiant =

Preserved British 4-6-0 locomotive

GWR 5080 Defiant
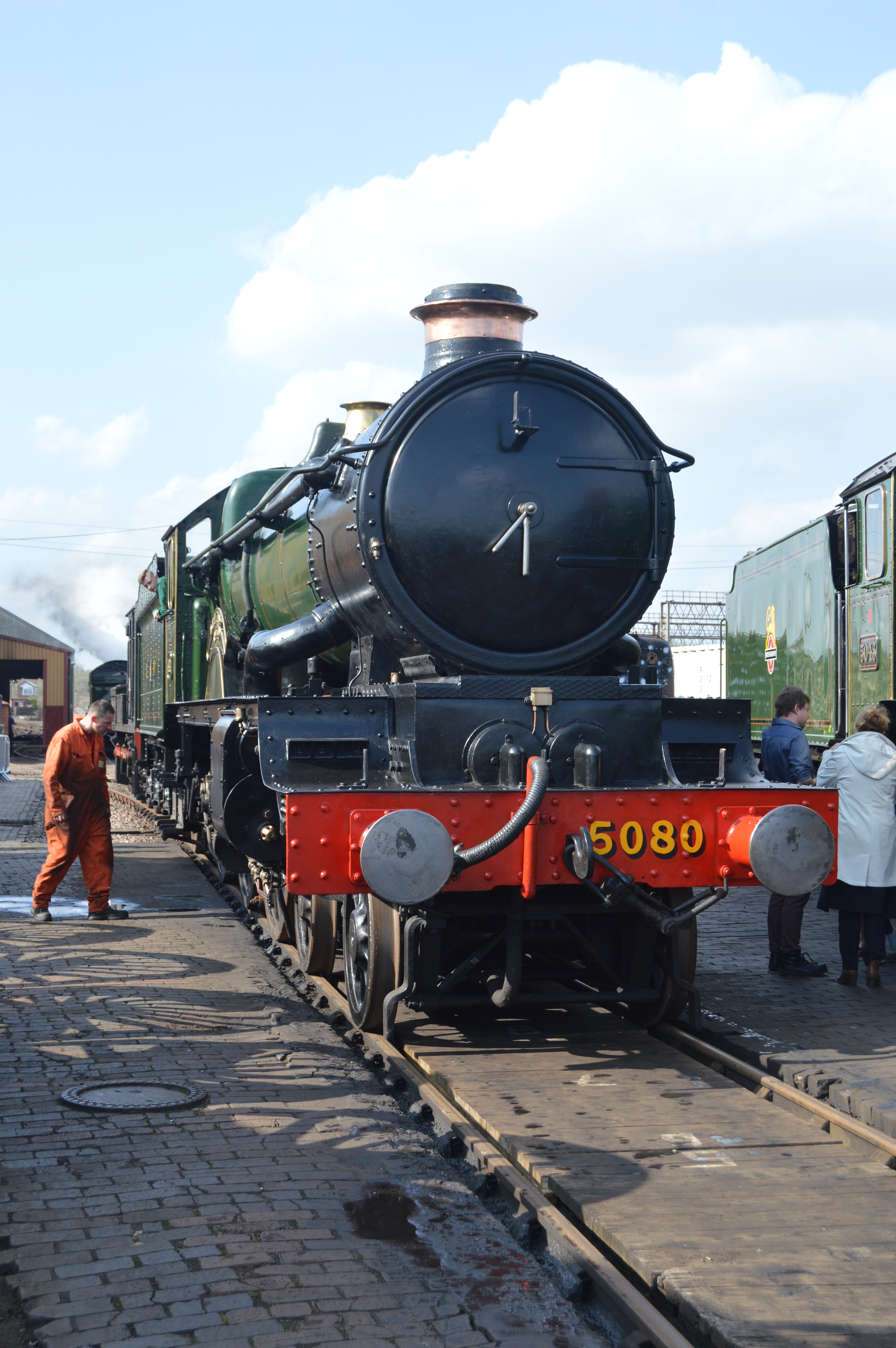
- Defiant is sat waiting for 5043 to be moved off its turntable road prior to being taken back to the shed
Type and origin
- Power type: Steam
- Designer: Charles Collett
- Builder: GWR Swindon Works
- Build date: May 1939
Specifications
- Configuration
  - Whyte: 4-6-0
- Gauge: 4 ft 8 1/2 in (1,435 mm)
- Leading dia.: 3 ft 2 in (0.965 m)
- Driver dia.: 6 ft 8 1/2 in (2.045 m)
- Length: 65 ft 2 in (19.86 m) over buffers
- Width: 8 ft 11 in (2.718 m)
- Height: 13 ft 1 in (3.988 m) (Cut back from 13 ft 4 1/2 in (4.077 m))
- Loco weight: 79 long tons 17 cwt (178,900 lb or 81.1 t); 89.4 short tons full
- Tender weight: 47 long tons 6 cwt (106,000 lb or 48.1 t); 53.0 short tons full
- Fuel type: Coal
- Fuel capacity: 6 long tons 0 cwt (13,400 lb or 6.1 t); 6 long tons 0 hundredweight (6.10 t; 6.72 short tons)
- Water cap.: 4,000 imp gal (18,000 L; 4,800 US gal)
- Firebox
  - Grate area: 29.36 sq ft (2.728 m^{2})
- Boiler: GWR Standard Number 8
- Boiler pressure: 225 lbf/in^{2} (1.55 MPa)
- Heating surface
  - Firebox: 162.7 sq ft (15.12 m^{2}) (Collett); 163.5 sq ft (15.19 m^{2}) (Hawksworth)
  - Tubes: 1,857.7 sq ft (172.59 m^{2}) (Collett); 1,799.5 sq ft (167.18 m^{2}) (Hawksworth)
- Cylinders: Four (two inside, two outside)
- Cylinder size: 16 in × 26 in (406 mm × 660 mm)
- Valve gear: Inside cylinders: Walschaerts; Outside cylinders: derived from inside cylinders via rocking bars.
- Valve type: Piston valves
- Loco brake: Vacuum
Performance figures
- Maximum speed: 25mph - (heritage railways) 45mph - (mainline, tender first) 75mph - (mainline, chimney first)
- Tractive effort: 31,625 lbf (140.68 kN)
Career
- Operators: Great Western Railway; British Railways
- Power class: GWR: D BR: 7P
- Axle load class: GWR: Red
- Withdrawn: April 1963
- Current owner: Tyseley Locomotive Works
- Disposition: Stored

GWR 4073 Class 5080 Defiant is a GWR 4073 Class steam locomotive built for the Great Western Railway at Swindon Works in May 1939. It was originally named Ogmore Castle.

== Allocations ==
The following is a list of 5080's shed locations during her career with the GWR and British Railways over time.

Shed allocations
| Location | Shed code | From |
|---|---|---|
| Old Oak Common | PDN | 25 May 1936 |
| Cardiff Canton | CDF | August 1940 |
| Swindon | SDN | 9 January 1941 |
| Cardiff Canton | CDF | 20 March 1941 |
| Swindon | SDN | 16 August 1949 |
| Cardiff Canton | CDF (86C) | 13 September 1949 |
| Landore | 87E | December 1955 |
| Llanelly | 87F | September 1961 |

== Renaming ==
Prior to 5080's transfer to Cardiff Canton from Swindon, the engine was renamed Defiant in January 1941, commemorating one of the many types of aircraft which had taken part in the Battle of Britain. The engines original name Ogmore Castle was also used on an earlier member of the class and later used by two sister engines; the name was originally allocated to 5056 before it was renamed Earl of Powis in Sept 1937. Following 5080's renaming, the Ogmore Castle was transferred to No. 7007 (later renamed Great Western in January 1948) and 7035.

== British Railways ==
After the arrival of the Britannia Class Pacifics on the Western Region, it was moved to Carmarthen in 1959, staying there until its final move to Llanelli in May 1961.

== Withdrawal and Preservation ==
It was withdrawn in April 1963 and acquired by Woodham Brothers scrapyard in Barry, Vale of Glamorgan, South Wales in October that year.

It was sold to the Standard Gauge Steam Trust (since renamed Tyseley Locomotive Works), initially as spare parts for 7029 Clun Castle, and left as the 62nd departure from Barry in August 1974. Its restoration was completed in July 1987, and it ran for a number of years, appearing on various preserved lines such as the Llangollen Railway Easter 1996. After its boiler certificate expired in 1997, it was sent to be displayed at the Buckinghamshire Railway Centre, where it remained until May 2017 when it was returned to Tyseley.

Defiant is at present stored at Tyseley Locomotive Works, but makes appearances at Tyseley's open weekends as a static exhibit. A group called "The Defiant Club" are raising money to fund an overhaul of No. 5080 for a return to service on the mainline to work excursion trains. As of March 2024, 5080's tender is undergoing overhaul with completion expected before the end of 2024 and the engines boiler is due to be assessed in 2024 to ascertain how much it will cost. To speed up 5080's return to service, Tyseley's intention is to only overhaul the engines boiler and leave it's bottom-end intact. The engine will be overhauled only for use on heritage railways but once enough money has been raised to cover a full mechanical overhaul for 5080, the engine will be overhauled to mainline standards.

== Gallery ==
Below are a set of photos showing 5080 during its career with British Railways alongside its time at Barry Island and in preservation.

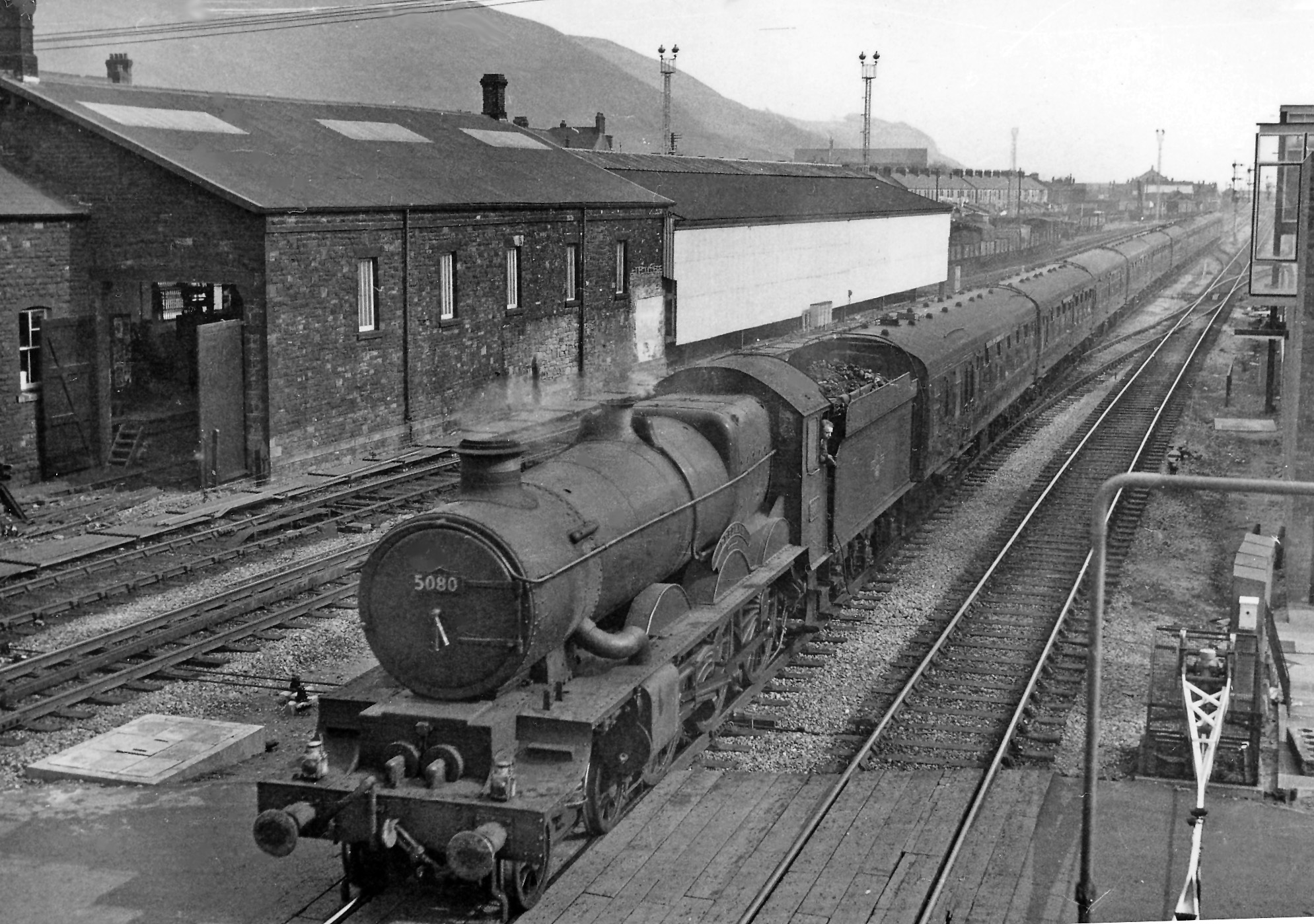
Defiant passing through Port Talbot with the West Wales Express from Paddington - Pembroke Dock and Milford Haven in April 1962.

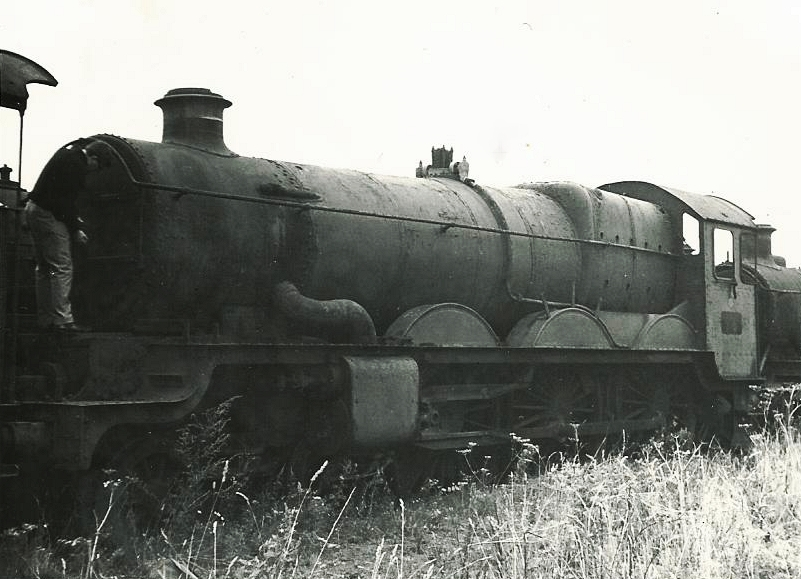
Defiant minus tender at Woodham's Scrapyard at Barry in May 1967.

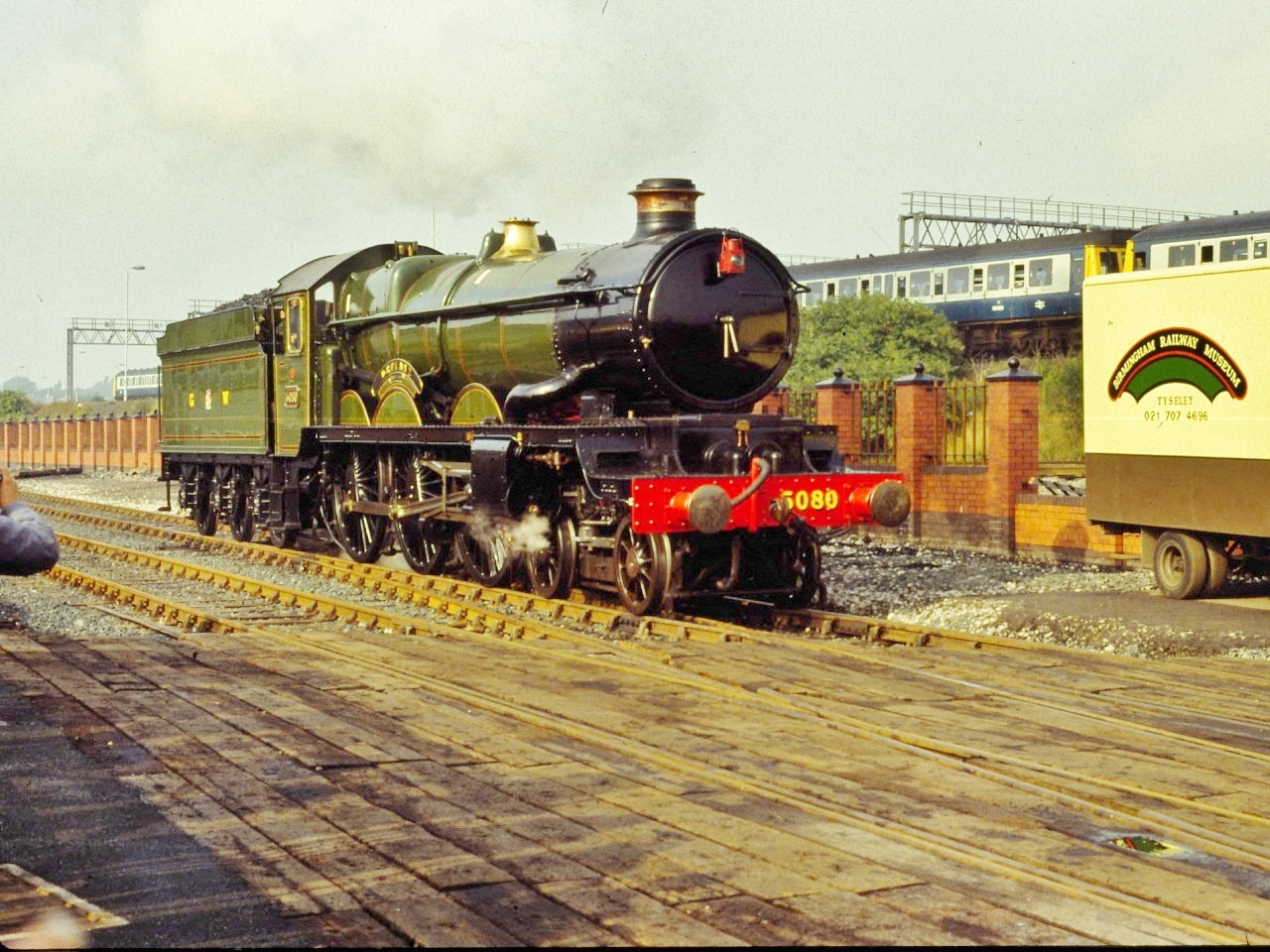
Defiant on the demonstration line at Tyseley Locomotive Works in August 1987.

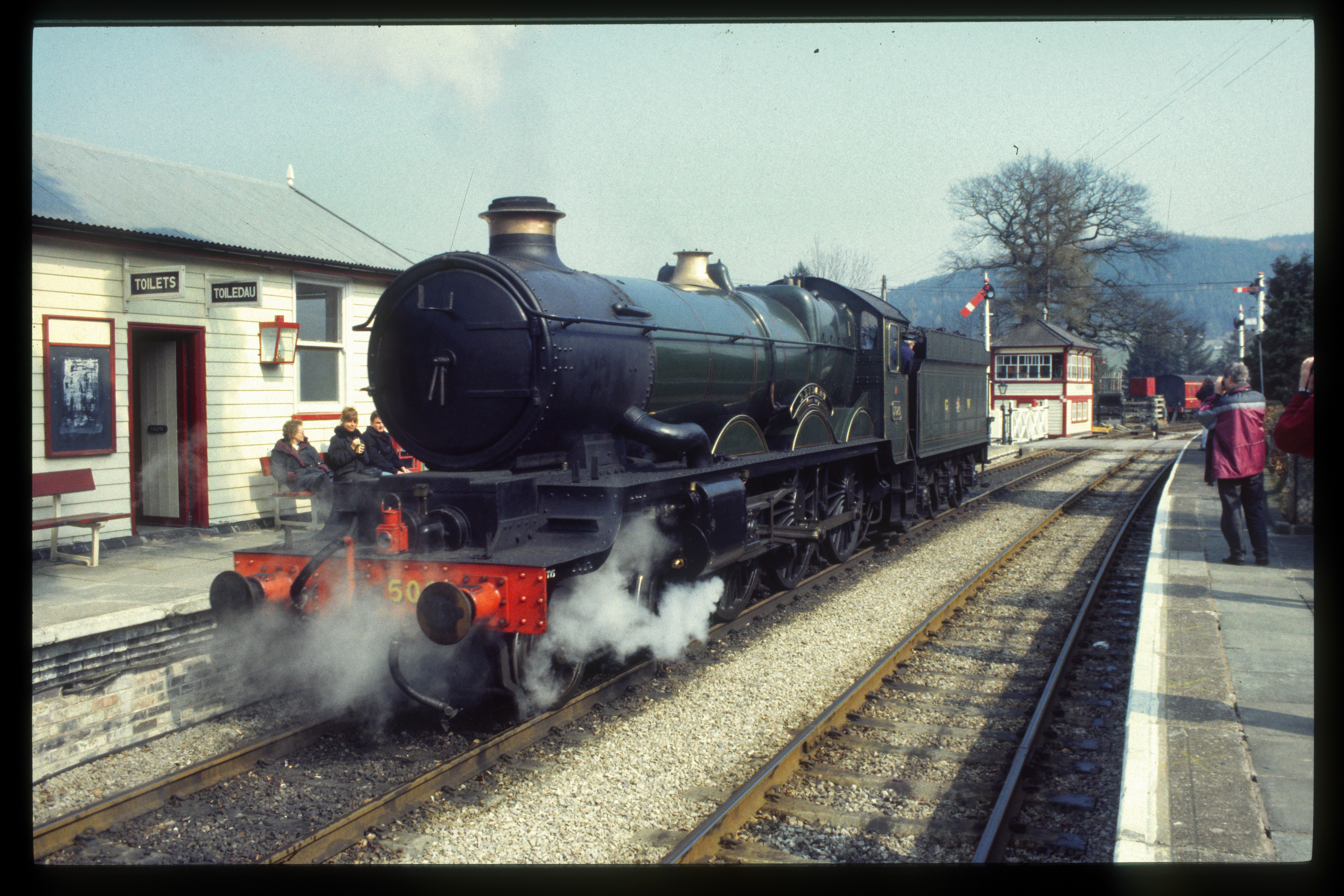
Castle Class No.5080 shunts at Glyndyfrdwy on Llangollen Railway Easter 1996 (possibly 5/4/96)

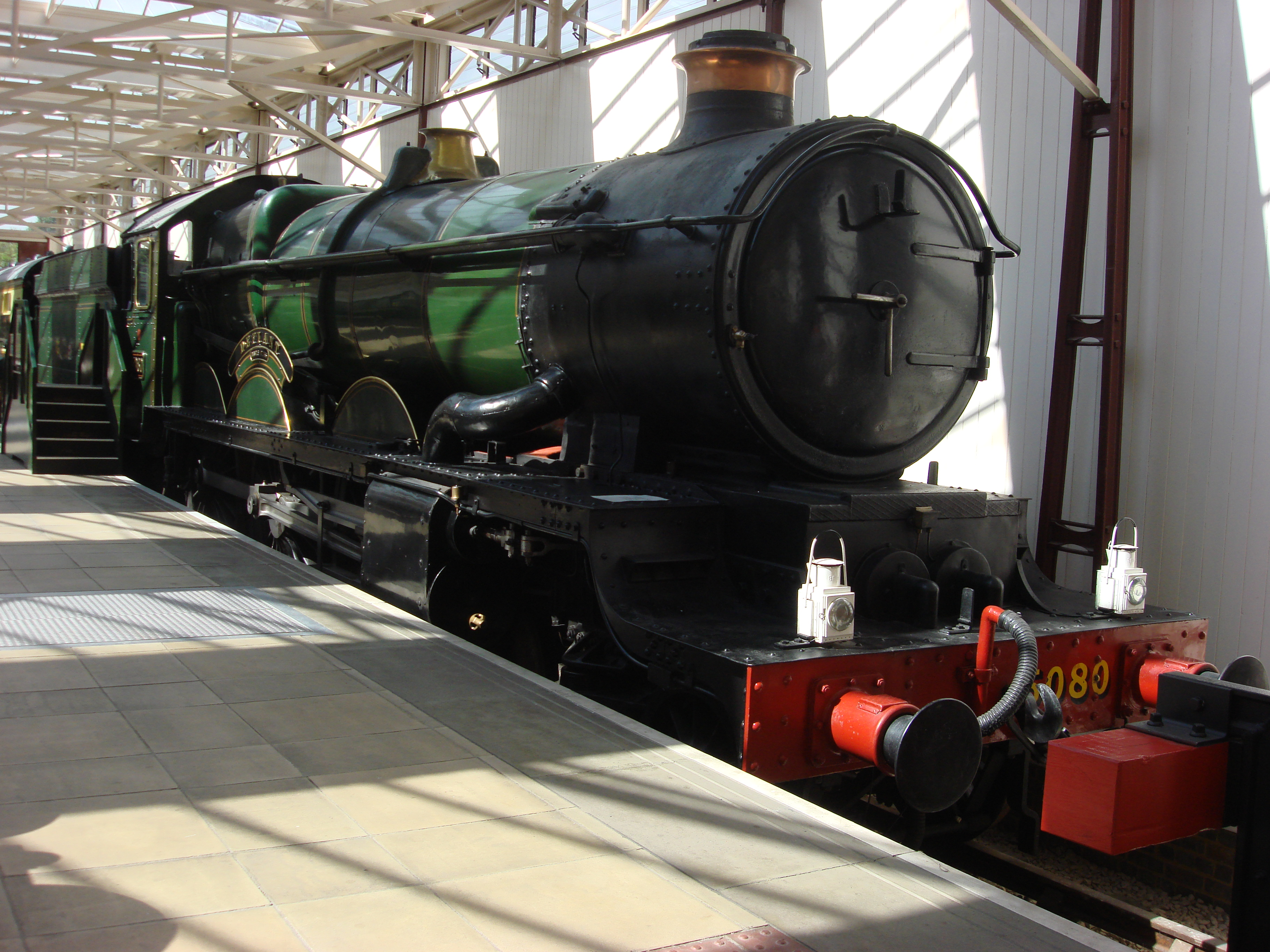
Defiant on display at the Buckinghamshire Railway Centre in August 2008.

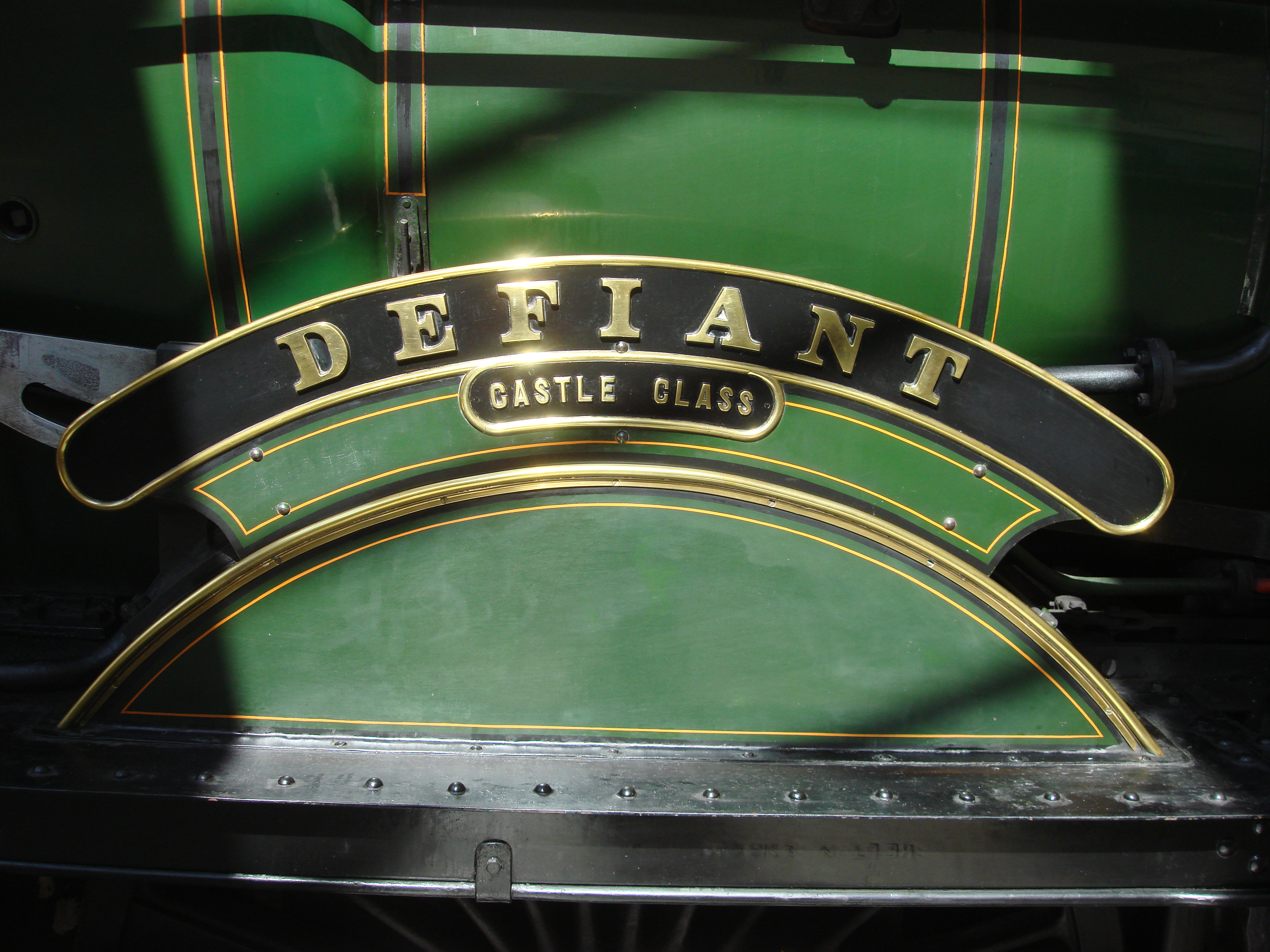
Defiant's nameplate.

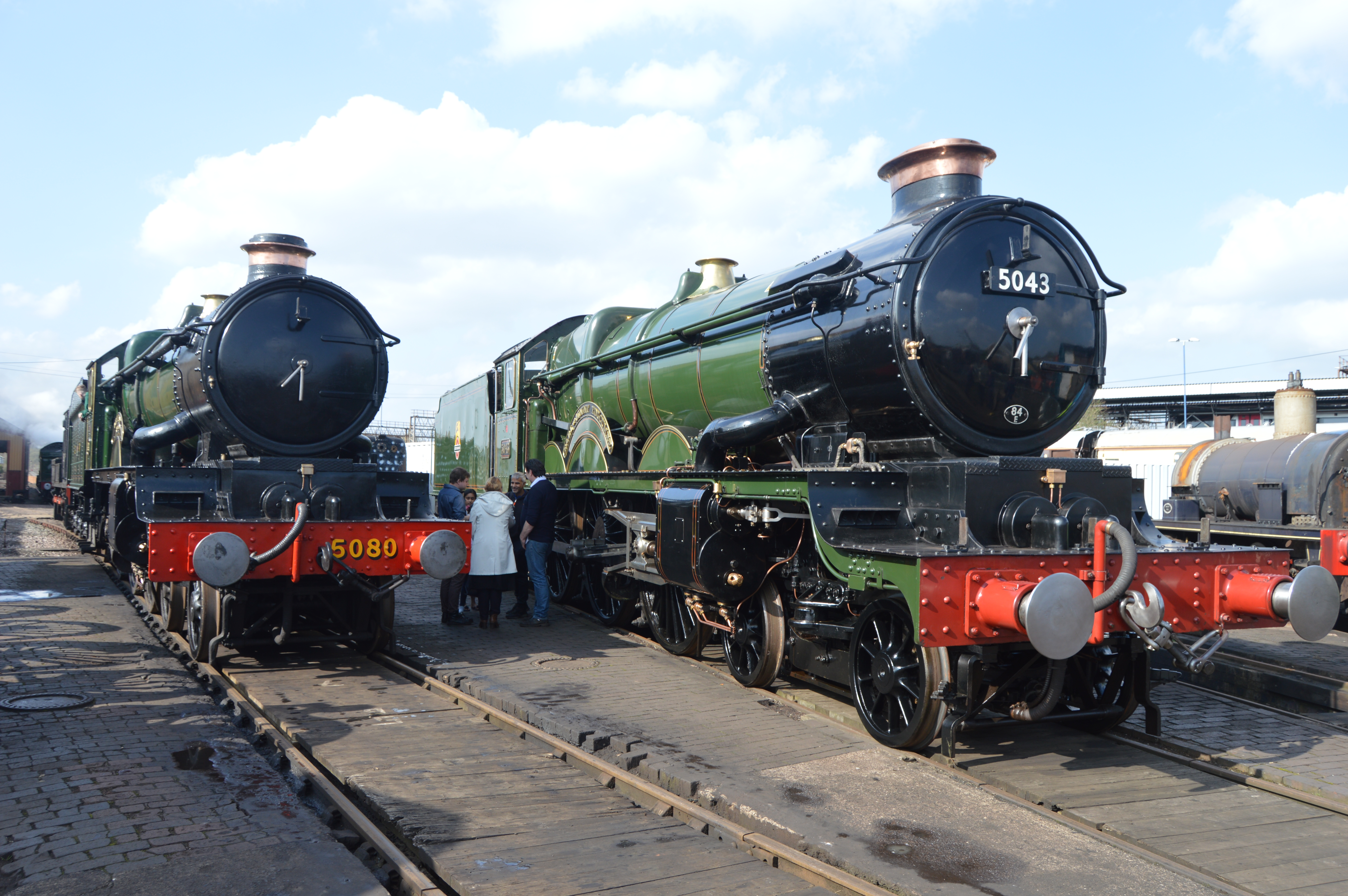
Defiant parked up opposite classmate 5043 Earl of Mount Edgcumbe during the Clun Castle steaming event in April 2018.
