= GWR 4073 Class 5051 Earl Bathurst =

Preserved British steam locomotive

GWR 5051 Drysllwyn Castle
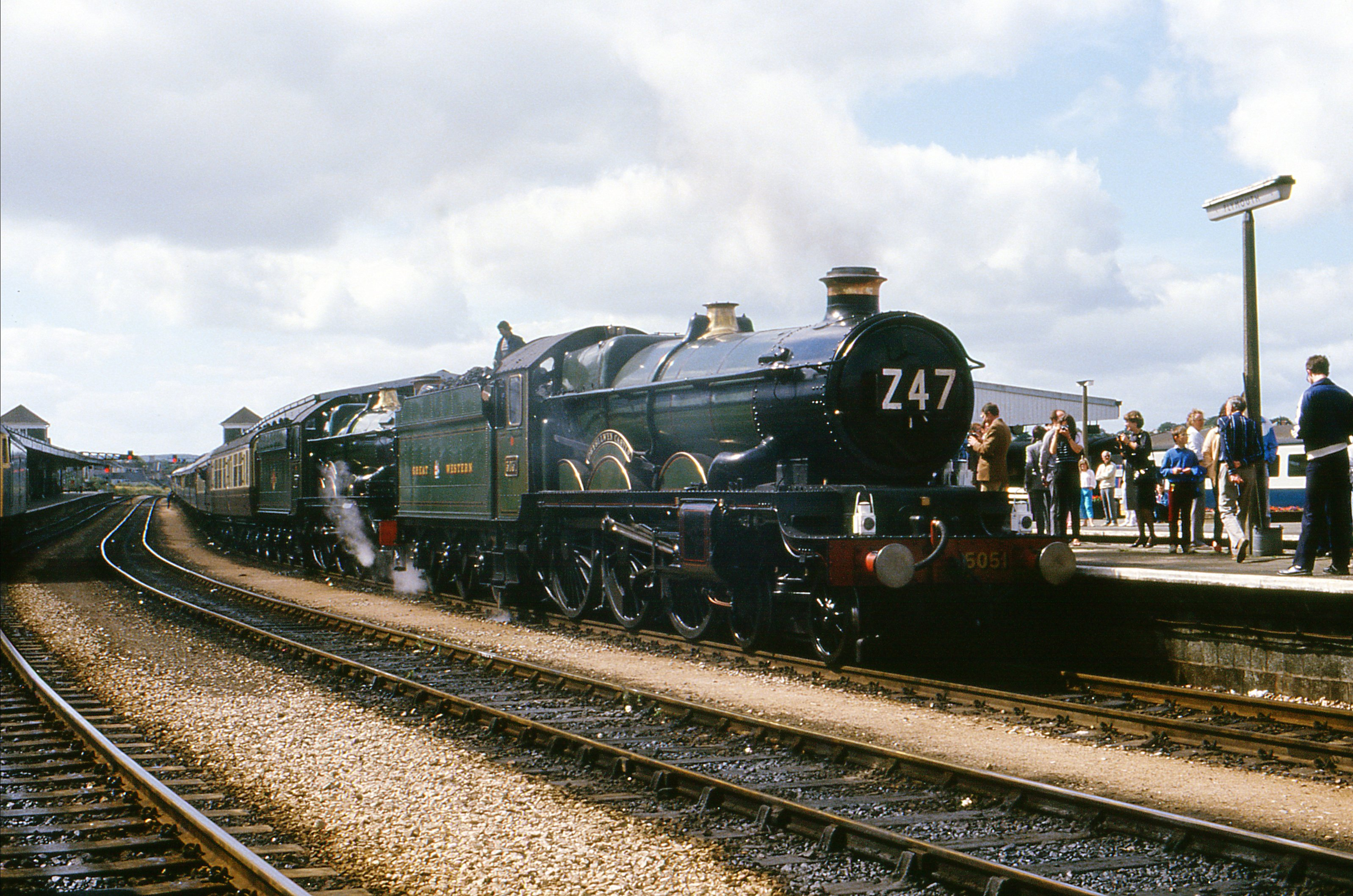
- 5051 Drysllwyn Castle & 7029 Clun Castle at Plymouth in 1985 while working "The Great Western Limited" railtour.
Type and origin
- Power type: Steam
- Designer: Charles Collett
- Builder: GWR Swindon Works
- Build date: May 1936
Specifications
- Configuration
  - Whyte: 4-6-0
- Gauge: 4 ft 8 1/2 in (1,435 mm)
- Leading dia.: 3 ft 2 in (0.965 m)
- Driver dia.: 6 ft 8 1/2 in (2.045 m)
- Length: 65 ft 2 in (19.86 m) over buffers
- Width: 8 ft 11 in (2.718 m)
- Height: 13 ft 1 in (3.988 m) (Cut back from 13 ft 4 1/2 in (4.077 m))
- Loco weight: 79 long tons 17 cwt (178,900 lb or 81.1 t); 89.4 short tons full
- Tender weight: 47 long tons 6 cwt (106,000 lb or 48.1 t); 53.0 short tons full
- Fuel type: Coal
- Fuel capacity: 6 long tons 0 cwt (13,400 lb or 6.1 t); 6 long tons 0 hundredweight (6.10 t; 6.72 short tons)
- Water cap.: 4,000 imp gal (18,000 L; 4,800 US gal)
- Firebox
  - Grate area: 29.36 sq ft (2.728 m^{2})
- Boiler: GWR Standard Number 8
- Boiler pressure: 225 lbf/in^{2} (1.55 MPa)
- Heating surface
  - Firebox: 162.7 sq ft (15.12 m^{2}) (Collett); 163.5 sq ft (15.19 m^{2}) (Hawksworth)
  - Tubes: 1,857.7 sq ft (172.59 m^{2}) (Collett); 1,799.5 sq ft (167.18 m^{2}) (Hawksworth)
- Cylinders: Four (two inside, two outside)
- Cylinder size: 16 in × 26 in (406 mm × 660 mm)
- Valve gear: Inside cylinders: Walschaerts; Outside cylinders: derived from inside cylinders via rocking bars.
- Valve type: Piston valves
- Loco brake: Vacuum
Performance figures
- Tractive effort: 31,625 lbf (140.68 kN)
Career
- Operators: Great Western Railway; British Railways
- Power class: GWR: D BR: 7P
- Axle load class: GWR: Red
- Withdrawn: May 1963
- Current owner: Didcot Railway Centre
- Disposition: Static Display

5051 Drysllwyn Castle is a Great Western Railway (GWR) Castle Class locomotive built at Swindon Works in May 1936 and named after Dryslwyn Castle. It is owned by the Didcot Railway Centre.

== Service life ==
5051 was built at Swindon Works in May 1936 and was named after Dryslwyn Castle, carrying this name for the first 18 months of its working life before being renamed to Earl Bathurst in August 1937 (the name coming from a de-named Dukedog Class No. 3208/9008). It would carry this name for the rest of its Great Western and British Railways working career. Its original name would later be applied to classmate No. 7018.

It was first allocated to Landore depot in Swansea and remained there until June of 1961, when it was transferred to Neath (shed code 87A). It was transferred to Llanelly (87F) in February 1963 and remained there until withdrawal in May that same year, having run 1,300,000 miles. It was later sold to Woodham Brothers in Oct of the same year.

== Preservation ==
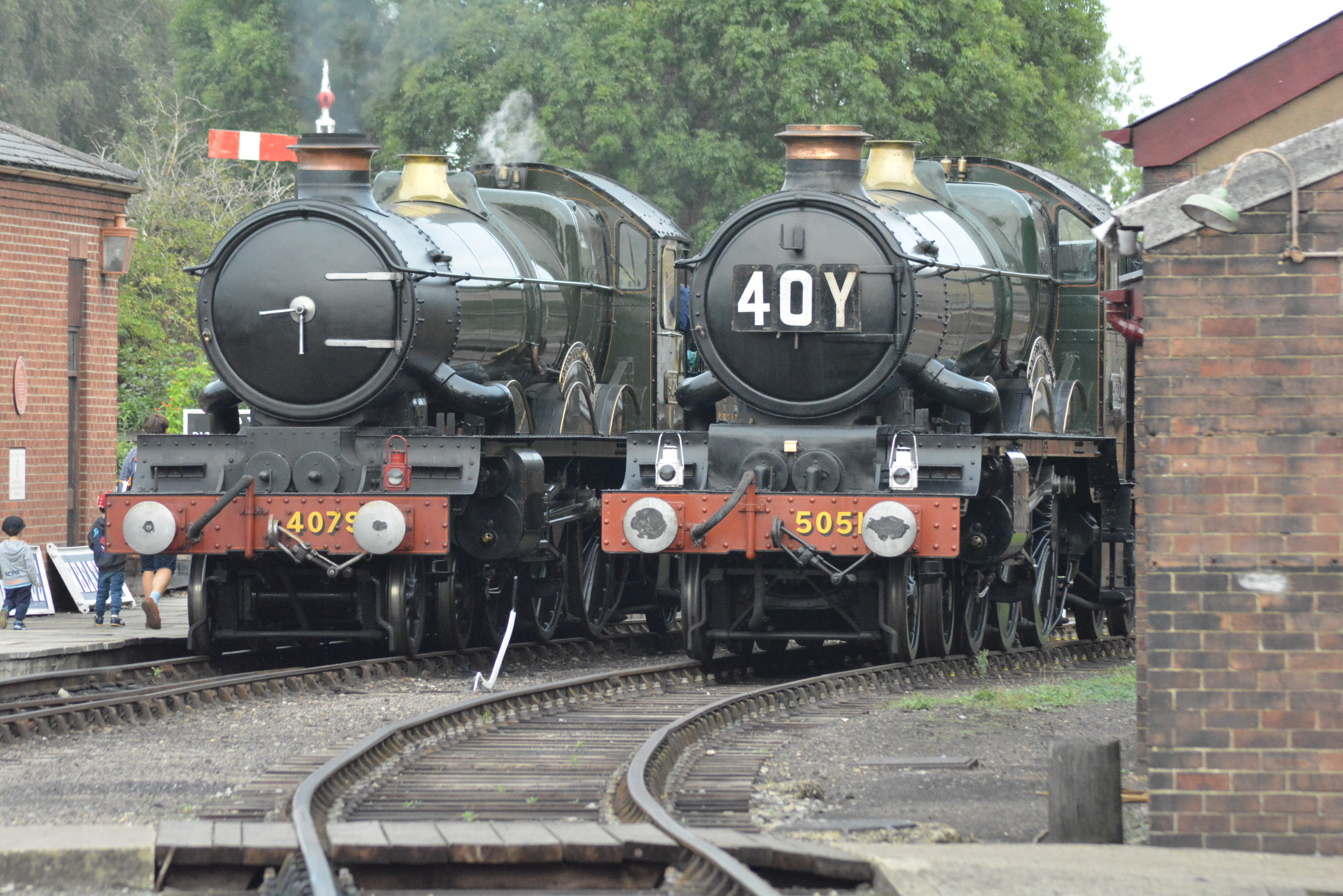
4079 Pendennis Castle and 5051 Earl Bathurst at Didcot, 2025

5051 was sold to John Mynors and left Barry in February 1970 for Didcot Railway Centre. John Mynors subsequently passed on ownership to the Great Western Society. It was restored to steam in 1979 and was reunited with its original Drysllwyn Castle nameplates. It was regularly steamed during the 150th anniversary celebrations of the Great Western Railway in 1985.

It returned to steam in 1998 following an overhaul at Didcot and it was later returned to mainline service. On one occasion in the summer of 2003, it stood in for 7802 Bradley Manor working the Torbay Express, promoted by Past-Time Rail, after 7802 developed a hot axle box.

It ran for most of its preserved life in lined GWR green with the letters GW on its tender. Prior to withdrawal, it was painted in BR lined green with the early emblem on its tender. Its boiler ticket later expired in 2008. At present, 5051 remains a static display.

In preservation, it has run with both Collett and Hawksworth tenders; it was initially paired with a Collett tender following its restoration from scrapyard condition in the 1970s, and briefly used a Churchward tender following its overhaul in 1998. It was later paired with a Hawksworth tender, which it used for its previous boiler ticket. It has now once again been paired with a Collett tender while on display in the Great Western Society's engine shed at Didcot.
