= GWR 4073 Class =

Class of 171 four-cylinder 4-6-0 locomotives

GWR 4073 Castle class
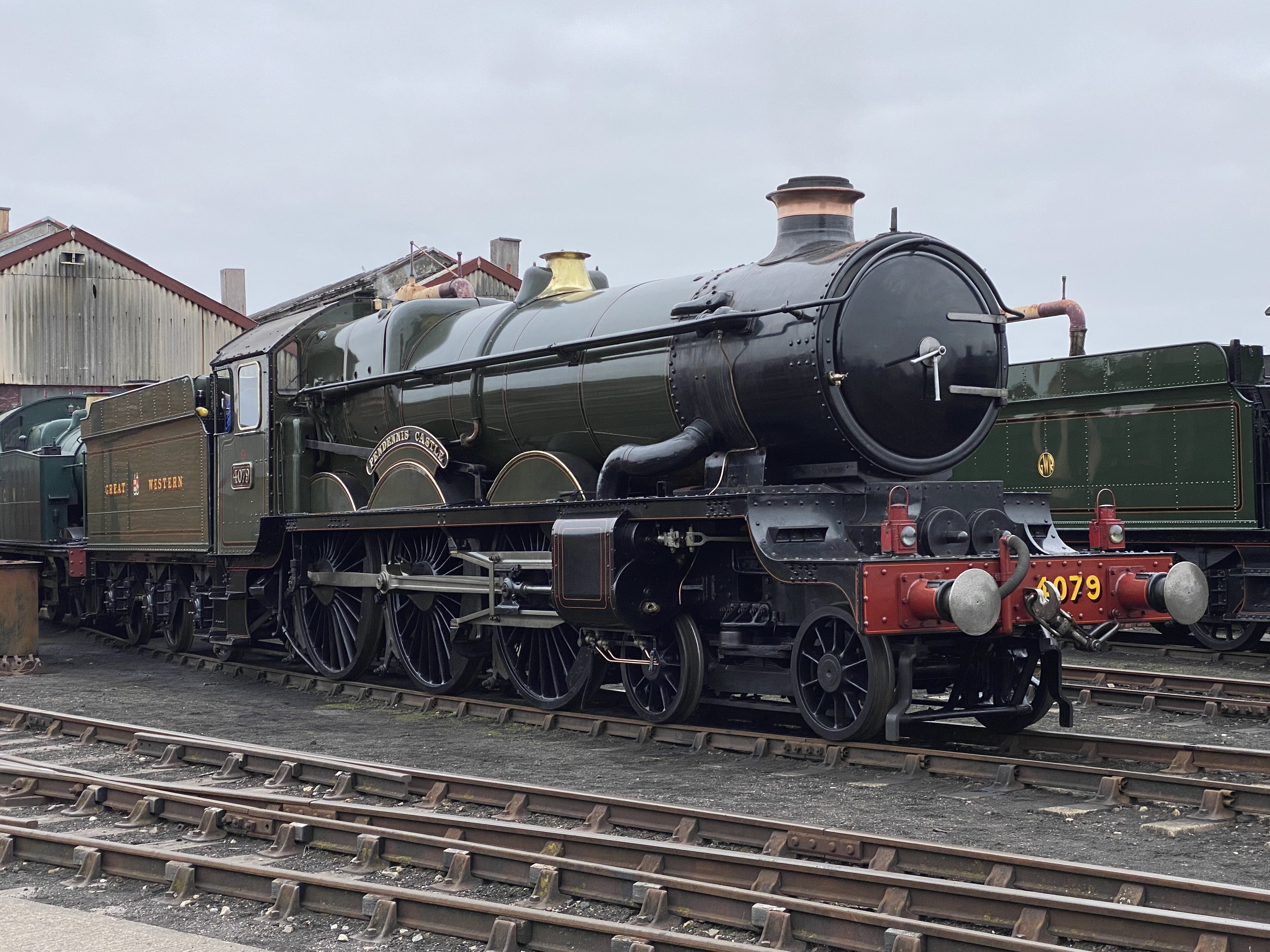
- 4079 Pendennis Castle at Didcot Railway Centre in 2023
Type and origin
- Power type: Steam
- Designer: Charles Collett
- Builder: GWR / BR Swindon Works
- Order number: Lots 224, 232, 234, 280, 295, 296, 303, 310, 317, 324, 357, 367, 375
- Build date: 1923–1950
- Total produced: 171
Specifications
- Configuration
  - Whyte: 4-6-0
  - UIC: 2′C h4
- Gauge: 4 ft 8 1/2 in (1,435 mm) standard gauge
- Leading dia.: 3 ft 2 in (0.965 m)
- Driver dia.: 6 ft 8 1/2 in (2.045 m)
- Minimum curve: 8 chains (530 ft; 160 m) normal, 7 chains (460 ft; 140 m) slow
- Length: 65 ft 2 in (19.86 m) over buffers
- Width: 8 ft 11 in (2.718 m)
- Height: 13 ft 4 1/2 in (4.077 m)
- Axle load: 19 long tons 14 cwt (44,100 lb or 20 t); 22.1 short tons full
- Adhesive weight: 58 long tons 17 cwt (131,800 lb or 59.8 t); 65.9 short tons full
- Loco weight: 79 long tons 17 cwt (178,900 lb or 81.1 t); 89.4 short tons full
- Tender weight: 47 long tons 6 cwt (106,000 lb or 48.1 t); 53.0 short tons full
- Fuel type: Coal
- Fuel capacity: Churchward tender: 7 long tons (7.1 t; 7.8 short tons); Collett/Hawksworth tender: 6 long tons (6.1 t; 6.7 short tons)
- Water cap.: Churchward tender: 3,500 imp gal (16,000 L; 4,200 US gal); Collett/Hawksworth tender: 4,000 imp gal (18,000 L; 4,800 US gal)
- Firebox
  - Grate area: 29.36 sq ft (2.728 m^{2})
- Boiler: GWR Standard No. 8
- Boiler pressure: 225 lbf/in^{2} (1.55 MPa)
- Heating surface
  - Firebox: 162.7 sq ft (15.12 m^{2}) (Collett); 163.5 sq ft (15.19 m^{2}) (Hawksworth)
  - Tubes: 1,857.7 sq ft (172.59 m^{2}) (Collett); 1,799.5 sq ft (167.18 m^{2}) (Hawksworth)
- Superheater
  - Type: 14-element "Swindon" (Collett); 21-element (Hawksworth)
  - Heating area: 262.6 sq ft (24.40 m^{2}) (Collett); 295.0 sq ft (27.41 m^{2}) (Hawksworth)
- Cylinders: Four (two inside, two outside)
- Cylinder size: 16 in × 26 in (406 mm × 660 mm)
- Valve gear: Inside cylinders: Walschaerts; Outside cylinders: derived from inside cylinders via rocking bars.
- Valve type: Piston valves
Performance figures
- Tractive effort: 31,625 lbf (140.68 kN)
Career
- Operators: Great Western Railway; British Railways
- Power class: GWR: D; BR: 7P
- Numbers: 4073–4099; 5000–5099; 7000–7037.
- Axle load class: GWR: Red
- Locale: Great Western Main Line
- Withdrawn: May 1950 to December 1965
- Disposition: Eight preserved, remainder scrapped

The 4073 or Castle Class are 4-6-0 type steam locomotives of the Great Western Railway, built between 1923 and 1950. They were designed by the railway's Chief Mechanical Engineer, Charles Collett, for working the company's express passenger trains. They could reach speeds of up to 100 mph (160 km/h).

== Background ==
The origins of this highly successful design date back to the Star Class of 1907 which introduced the basic 4-cylinder 4-6-0 layout with long-travel valves and Belpaire firebox that was to become characteristic of Great Western Railway (GWR) express passenger locomotives. The Star class was designed to take the top express trains on the GWR, with 61 in service by 1914, but after World War I there was a need for an improved design. To meet this need, Chief Mechanical Engineer George Churchward had in mind an enlarged Star class design with a standard No.7 boiler, as fitted to his GWR 4700 Class express freight 2-8-0. However, this combination would have taken the axle load over the 20-ton limit then set by the civil engineers, and in the end, nothing came of the idea.

== Design ==
Charles Collett succeeded Churchward as Chief Mechanical Engineer of the GWR in 1922 and immediately set about meeting the need for a new locomotive design that would both supplement the Stars and replace them on the heaviest expresses. Collett's solution was to take the basic layout of the Star with an extended frame, and add a newly designed No.8 boiler which was both larger and lighter. The increased amount of steam that this produced allowed an increase in the cylinder diameter from 15 in × 26 in (381 mm × 660 mm) to 16 in × 26 in (406 mm × 660 mm). The extended frame allowed for a side window cab and an increased grate area. The result was an increase in tractive effort to 31,625 lbf (140.68 kN), and a well-proportioned aesthetic that remained within the 20-ton axle limit.

== Production ==
Unlike the Star class, there was no prototype. Collett was sufficiently confident of the design to place an order with Swindon Works (Lot 224) for ten locomotives in 1923, although there was a four-month delay between the appearance of the first example in August 1923 and the second in December, to allow for the correction of any teething problems. Thereafter the remaining eight locomotives came out at regular intervals until April 1924. They were 4073–4082, the number series continuing unbroken from the Star class. The last 12 Star class locomotives, which were built in 1922–23, had been given names of abbeys in the western area served by the GWR. The new locomotives were named after castles, also in the west, beginning with Caerphilly Castle.

Over the twenty-seven years from August 1923 to August 1950, 155 Castles were built new at Swindon Works and a further sixteen were converted from other classes. In February 1952, two engines, 4082 Windsor Castle and 7013 Bristol Castle, swapped names and numbers: 7013 was disguised as 4082 to run George VI's funeral train and the numbers were never swapped back. 4082 was withdrawn from service in 1964 as 7013 and 7013 was withdrawn from service as 4082 in 1965.

=== New builds ===
The new-builds were as follows.

Great Western Railway

- Lot 224: Nos. 4073–4082, delivered August 1923 to April 1924.
- Lot 232: Nos. 4083–4092, delivered May to August 1925.
- Lot 234: Nos. 4093–4099 and 5000 to 5012, delivered May 1926 to July 1927.
- Lot 280: Nos. 5013–5022, delivered June to August 1932.
- Lot 295: Nos. 5023–5032, delivered June to August 1932.
- Lot 296: Nos. 5033–5042, delivered May to July 1933.
- Lot 303: Nos. 5043–5067, delivered March 1936 to July 1937. (Nos. 5043–5063 were originally named after Castles, but were renamed in 1937 after Earls)
- Lot 310: Nos. 5068–5082 delivered June 1938 to June 1939. (Nos. 5069 and 5070 were named after Isambard Kingdom Brunel and Sir Daniel Gooch; In 1941 5071–5082 were renamed after aircraft used by the Royal Air Force)
- Lot 324: Nos. 5093–5097, delivered June to July 1939.
- Lot 357: Nos. 5098–5099, 7000–7007 delivered May to July 1946.

British Railways (Western Region)

- Lot 367: Nos. 7008–7027, delivered May 1948 to August 1949.
- Lot 375: Nos. 7028–7037, delivered May 1950 to August 1950.

These locomotives were built with minimal changes to the dimensions. However, from 5013 Abergavenny Castle there was an alteration to the shape of the front-end casing over the inside cylinders, and from 5043 Earl of Mount Edgcumbe a shorter chimney was fitted. Those built before 1926 were fitted with a 3,500 imp gal (16,000 L; 4,200 US gal) tender but thereafter 4,000 imp gal (18,000 L; 4,800 US gal) became standard for the class.

=== Rebuilds ===
Between January and September 1924, the only Great Western 4-6-2, No.111 The Great Bear, was rebuilt into a member of the Castle Class, although only the "front portion of the original frames and the number plates were used again but probably little else". The new locomotive was renamed Viscount Churchill and survived until withdrawal in July 1953.

In April 1925, Star class No. 4009 Shooting Star was likewise rebuilt as a Castle by extending the frames and fitting a new Castle Class boiler and cab. It was renumbered and renamed 100 A1 Lloyds and was withdrawn in 1950.

In October 1925 a second Star class, No. 4016 The Somerset Light Infantry (Prince Albert's), was similarly converted to a Castle although in this case, it retained its name and number. Two further conversions of Stars were undertaken in 1926; Nos. 4032 Queen Alexandra and 4037 The South Wales Borderers retaining their names and numbers and surviving until 1951 and 1962 respectively.

In November 1929 the prototype for the Star Class, No. 4000 North Star was rebuilt into a Castle, being subsequently withdrawn in 1957.

Between 1937 and 1940 a further ten members of the 'Abbey series' of the Star class (Nos. 4063–4072) were rebuilt as Castles on Lot 317. They were allocated new numbers 5083 to 5092 but retained their original names and were withdrawn between 1958 and 1964.

== Publicity and trials ==
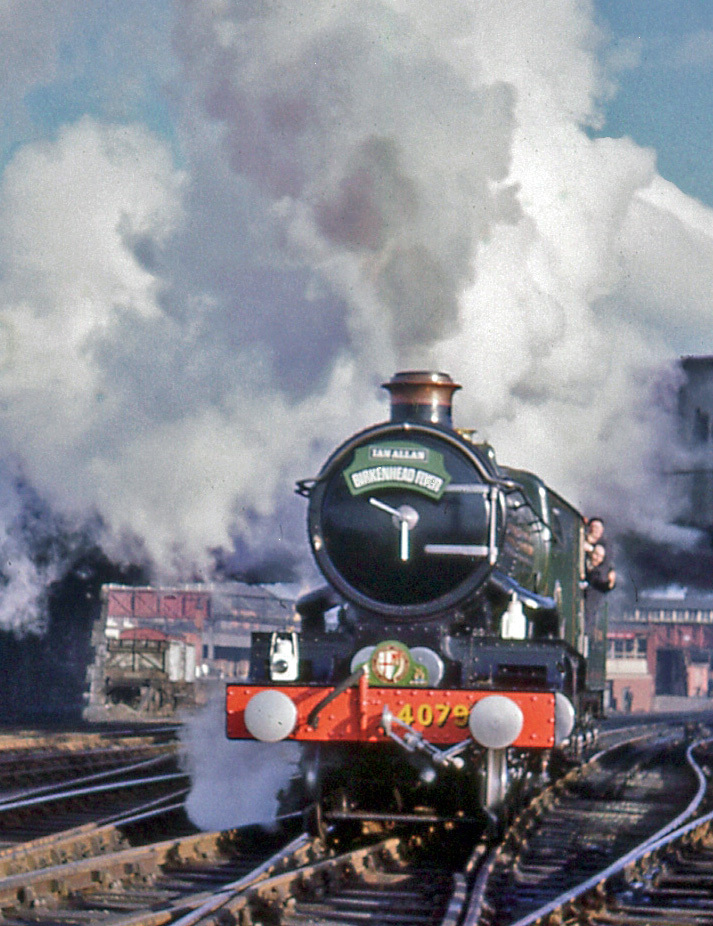
4079 Pendennis Castle at Chester General station in March 1967

When introduced they were heralded as Britain's most powerful express passenger locomotive, being some 10% more powerful than the Stars. The first, No. 4073 Caerphilly Castle, made its debut at Paddington station on 23 August 1923. The choice of 4082 as Windsor Castle proved fortuitous as this locomotive was used to haul the Royal Train when King George V and Queen Mary visited Swindon Works in 1924, and much publicity was gained when the king was invited to drive the engine back from the works to the station before the return journey, with the Queen and several high-ranking GWR officers also on the footplate.

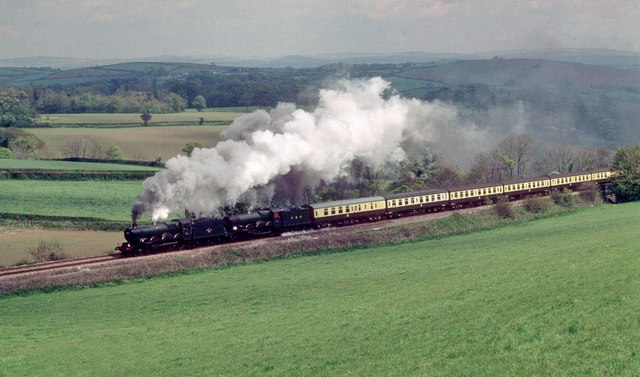
Castle class locos 5051 Earl Bathurst and 5029 Nunney Castle climb St Germans bank

5029 Nunney Castle steam special passing through Dorchester West in August 2011

During 1924, 4073 Caerphilly Castle was exhibited at the British Empire Exhibition at Wembley, alongside Nigel Gresley's Flying Scotsman. The Great Western declared their engine to be more powerful than its bigger LNER rival, and in terms of tractive effort alone they were entitled to do so. As a result of this, GWR General Manager Sir Felix Pole proposed to LNER Southern Area General Manager Alexander Wilson that a trial of the two types should take place via an exchange arrangement. The resulting trials commenced in April 1925 with 4079 Pendennis Castle representing the GWR on the East Coast Main Line and 4474 Victor Wild representing the LNER on GWR tracks. On the first morning Pendennis Castle was to work a 480-ton train from King's Cross to Doncaster, and LNER officials fully expected the smaller, lighter engine to encounter problems climbing Holloway Bank. However, railway writer Cecil J. Allen records that the GWR locomotive made a faster start from King's Cross to Finsbury Park than any LNER Pacific he had recorded up to that time, and over the trial Pendennis Castle kept well within the scheduled time and used less coal, considerably denting LNER pride. For the LNER, Victor Wild was compared on the Cornish Riviera Express to 4074 Caldicot Castle and although it kept to time the longer wheelbase of the Pacific proved unsuited to the many curves on the route. Again the GWR took the honours with Caldicot Castle burning less fuel and always ahead of time, this being illustrated on the last 2 days of the trial by gaining 15 minutes on the schedule in both directions.

In 1926, number 5000 Launceston Castle was loaned to the London, Midland & Scottish Railway (LMS) where it ran trials between London and Carlisle. The locomotive fulfilled the LMS requirements so well that the latter first requested the GWR to build a batch of Castles for use on the West Coast Main Line, and, failing that, a full set of construction drawings. Both proposals were rejected by the GWR Board of Directors. The LMS eventually succeeded in gaining access to the design by recruiting William Stanier, the GWR's Works Manager at its Swindon Works to become the new Chief Mechanical Engineer for the LMS.

In 1935 attention was turning to streamlining locomotives, particularly with the introduction of the LNER A4, and the GWR felt that they could gain publicity in this area. Instructions were passed to Swindon Works to select a suitable locomotive and as 5005 Manorbier Castle was being prepared for test, additions were made to the locomotive to effect some streamlining. The application of shaped steel sheet in an attempt to smooth airflow has been described as a "bodge-up" and certainly lacked either the elegance of the A4 design, or the sense of power associated with the streamlined LMS Coronation Class introduced 2 years later. Once the additions had been added a test run was carried out between Bristol and Swindon during which Manorbier Castle achieved a speed of 100 mph, but the experiment did not have any lasting effect on GWR locomotive design and the additions were later removed.

== Performance ==
The Castles handled all but the heaviest loads, these being entrusted to the 30-strong King Class, themselves a development of the Castles with an even larger boiler and smaller wheels (6 ft 6 in diameter) for both increased tractive effort and to allow for loading gauge clearance.

The Castle class was noted for superb performance overall, and notably on the Cheltenham Flyer during the 1930s: for example, on 6 June 1932 the train, pulled by 5006 Tregenna Castle, covered the 77.25 miles from Swindon to Paddington at an average speed of 81.68 mph start-to-stop (124.3 km at an average speed of 131.4 km/h). This world record for steam traction was widely regarded as an astonishing feat.

== Subsequent modification ==
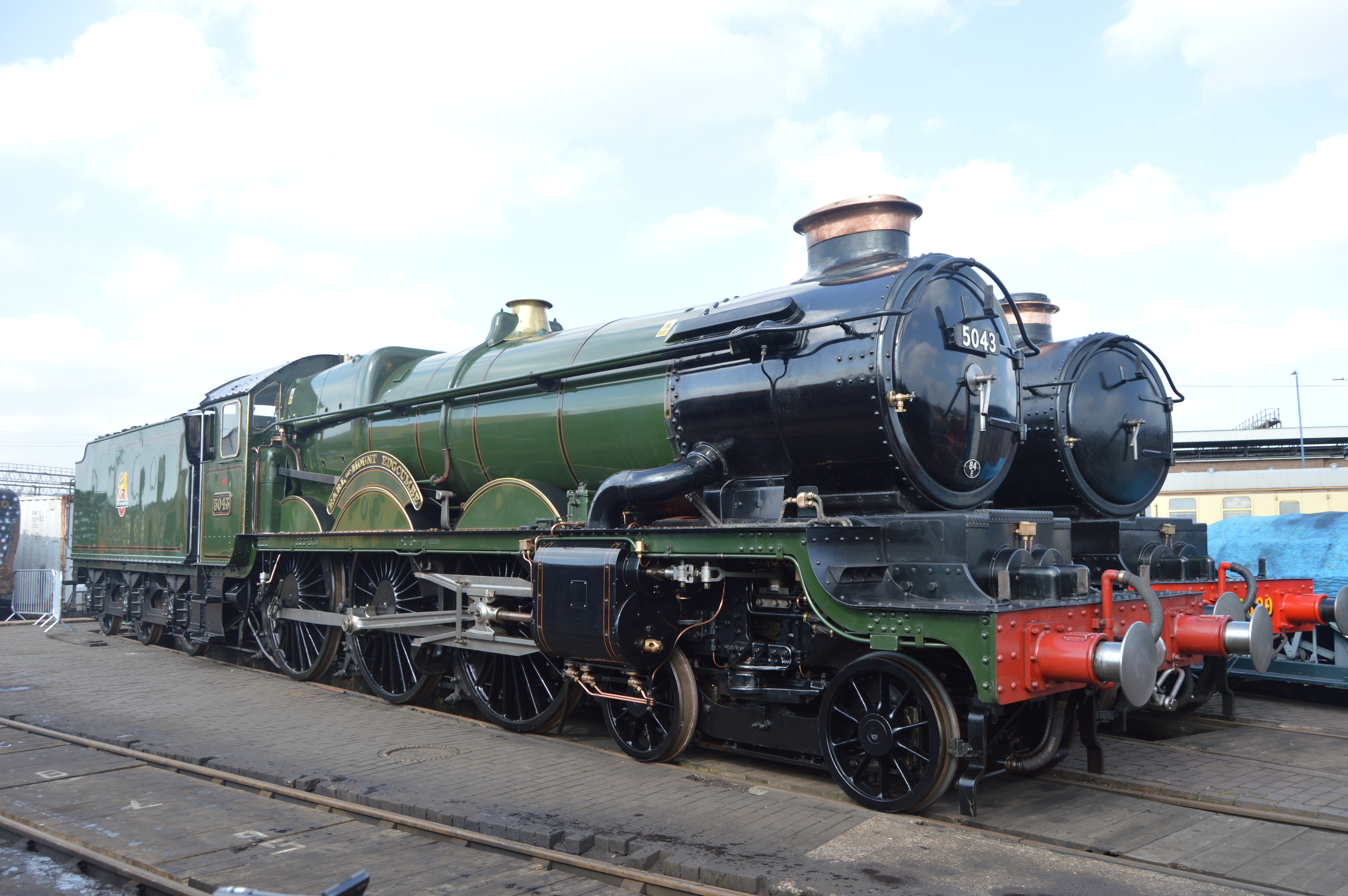
5043 Earl of Mount Edgcumbe is one of two preserved Castles to be fitted with a double chimney

In 1946 Frederick Hawksworth, Collett's successor, introduced a higher degree of superheat to the Castle boiler with resulting increased economy in water consumption. From 1956 the fitting of double chimneys to selected engines, combined with larger superheaters, further enhanced their capacity for sustained high-speed performance. The fastest recorded speed of a Castle Class engine was 102 mph achieved by 7018 Drysllwyn Castle at Little Somerford in April 1958 while hauling The Bristolian from Bristol to London. The non-stop run over 117.6 miles took 93 minutes 50 seconds, an average speed of more than 75 mph.

=== Oil firing ===
Between 1946 and 1948 five engines—100A1, 5039, 5079, 5083 and 5091—were converted to oil-firing, but were soon restored to burn coal. Eleven Halls were also temporarily converted.

== Accidents and incidents ==
- On 2 July 1941, 4091 Dudley Castle was hauling an express passenger train that was in a head-on collision with a freight train, hauled by LMS Stanier 8F 2-8-0 No. WD 407 (LMS 8293), at Slough, Berkshire. 5 people were killed and 21 were injured.
- On 30 November 1948, a passenger train hauled by 5022 Wigmore Castle overran signals and was in collision with locomotive 4150, which was running round its train at Lapworth. Eight passengers were injured.
- On 12 November 1958, a freight train, hauled by GWR 4700 Class 2-8-0 No. 4707, overran signals and was derailed at Highworth Junction, Swindon. Locomotive No. 5009 Shrewsbury Castle was hauling a newspaper train which collided with the wreckage.

== Royal connections ==
On 28 April 1924, King George V drove locomotive No. 4082 Windsor Castle from the Swindon Works to Swindon railway station, accompanied on the footplate by Queen Mary. Plaques to commemorate the event were fixed to the sides of the cab and it was considered to be a royal locomotive from then onwards. At the king's state funeral on 28 January 1936, Windsor Castle was chosen to haul the funeral train from Paddington Station in London to Windsor & Eton. It was preceded at ten-minute intervals by another six trains hauled by Castle-class engines, each carrying royal and other important mourners.

The same locomotive was requested for the funeral of King George VI in February 1952; however, Windsor Castle was under repair at Swindon, so the number, name plate and commemorative plaques were swapped with No. 7013 Bristol Castle for the event. Following the funeral, the two locomotives retained their exchanged names and numbers, but the commemorative plaques were returned. No. 7013 (originally 4082) was scrapped in September 1964 while number 4082 (originally 7013) survived until February 1965.

== Withdrawal ==
Withdrawal of steam power started in the 1950s, with the first 100 A1 Lloyds withdrawn from Old Oak Common in March 1950. The first "new build" Castle, number 4091 Dudley Castle, was withdrawn from Old Oak Common nearly nine years later in January 1959.

The lowest mileage of a Castle was the 580,346 miles run by 7035 Ogmore Castle between August 1950 and June 1964; the highest mileage of any Castle class was by 4080 Powderham Castle which totalled 1,974,461 miles in 40 years and 5 months.

The last three Castles to be withdrawn were all allocated to Gloucester shed, with 5042 Winchester Castle and 7022 Hereford Castle withdrawn in June 1965. The last to be withdrawn was 7029 Clun Castle in December 1965, which worked the last steam train out of Paddington on 27 November 1965.

Table of withdrawals
Year	Number in service at start of year	Number withdrawn	Total withdrawn	Locomotive numbers	Notes
1950	171	1	1	100A1	
1951	170	2	3	4016/32	
1953	168	1	4	111	
1957	167	1	5	4000	
1958	166	1	6	5086	
1959	165	3	9	4091, 5010/83	
1960	162	7	16	4073/84/97, 5005/09/28/79	4073 preserved
1961	155	4	20	4037/75/83/92	
1962	151	54	74	4077–78/85–86/94–95/99, 5003–04/06–08/11–13/16–17/19–21/24/27/30/32–36/44–48/52–53/59, 5061/62/64/66–69/72/75/77–78/82/84/88/90/94–95, 7016	
1963	97	49	123	4074/76/81/87/90/96/98, 5001/15/22–23/25/29/31/38/40–41/43/49–51/58/60/65/71/80–81/87/92–93/97/99, 7000–01/06–07/09/15/17–18/20–21/27–28/30–31/33/36–37	5029, 5043, 5051, 5080 & 7027 preserved
1964	48	36	159	4079–80/82/88–89/93, 5000/02/18/26/37/39/54–57/70/73–74/76/85/89/91/96/98, 7002–05/08/10/12/19/25–26/32	4079 preserved
1965	12	12	171	5014/42/63, 7011/13–14/22–24/29/34–35.	7029 preserved

== List of locomotives ==
See List of GWR 4073 Class locomotives

== Preservation ==
On 4 March 1967, Nos. 7029 Clun Castle and 4079 Pendennis Castle hauled specials from Banbury and Oxford respectively to Chester, to mark the end of through trains between Paddington and Birkenhead. These two, and six other Castles, survive in preservation.

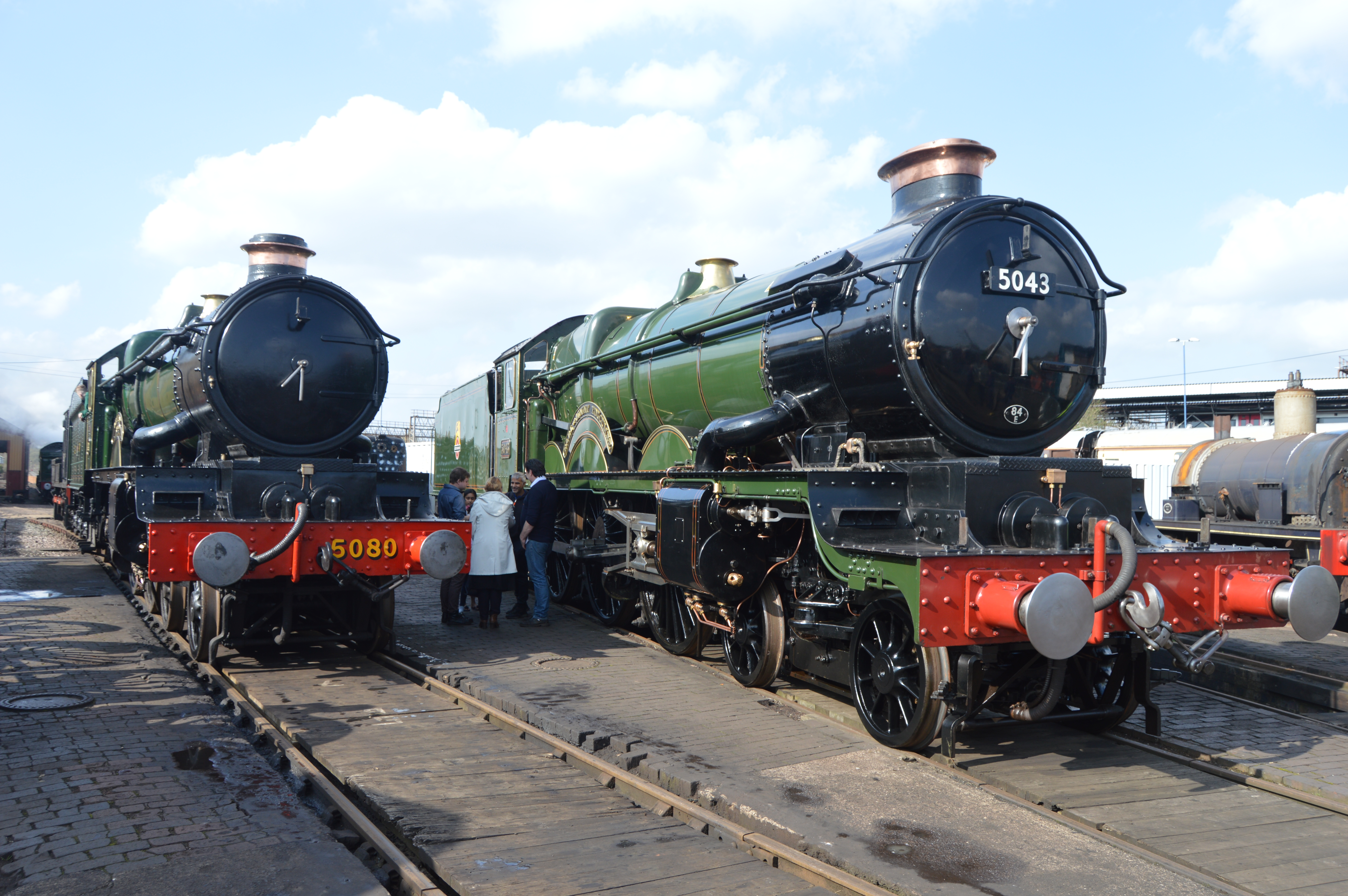
5080 Defiant and 5043 Earl of Mount Edgcumbe at Tyseley

Of the eight Castles to be preserved, six have steamed in preservation and have been operated on the main line. Three were obtained direct from BR, 4073, 4079 and 7029, with the remaining five being rescued from Barry Scrapyard.

No. 4073 Caerphilly Castle was given directly to the National Collection upon withdrawal and has not run since being preserved. It can currently be found at STEAM, the Museum of the Great Western Railway in Swindon. No. 7027 Thornbury Castle was in ex-Barry Scrapyard condition and in July 2016 was sold by Pete Waterman to the Somerset transport firm JJP Holdings SW, transported to Weston-super-Mare on a low loader, then placed on a temporary track in the Crosville Motor Services bus depot. In summer 2018 it was moved briefly to Tyseley Locomotive Works in Birmingham to make an appearance at their open weekend before moving to its planned home at the West Somerset Railway for restoration. It is now located at Loughborough on the Great Central Railway, but will not be restored to mainline standards as its current owner intends to run it for its first ticket on the GCR before considering future mainline certification.

Two of the eight preserved Castles, nos. 5043 Earl of Mount Edgcumbe and 7029 Clun Castle, are fitted with double chimneys while the remaining six are still fitted with the original single chimney.

4079 was purchased by Sir William McAlpine and hauled a small number of railtours on the main line in its early preservation years before being sold to Hamersley Iron in the Pilbara region of Western Australia and exported in 1977. In 1989 it was moved by road to Perth where it double-headed with 4472 Flying Scotsman operating as far as Esperance. In 2000 it was donated by Rio Tinto to the Great Western Society and restored to operational condition at the Didcot Railway Centre in 2021.

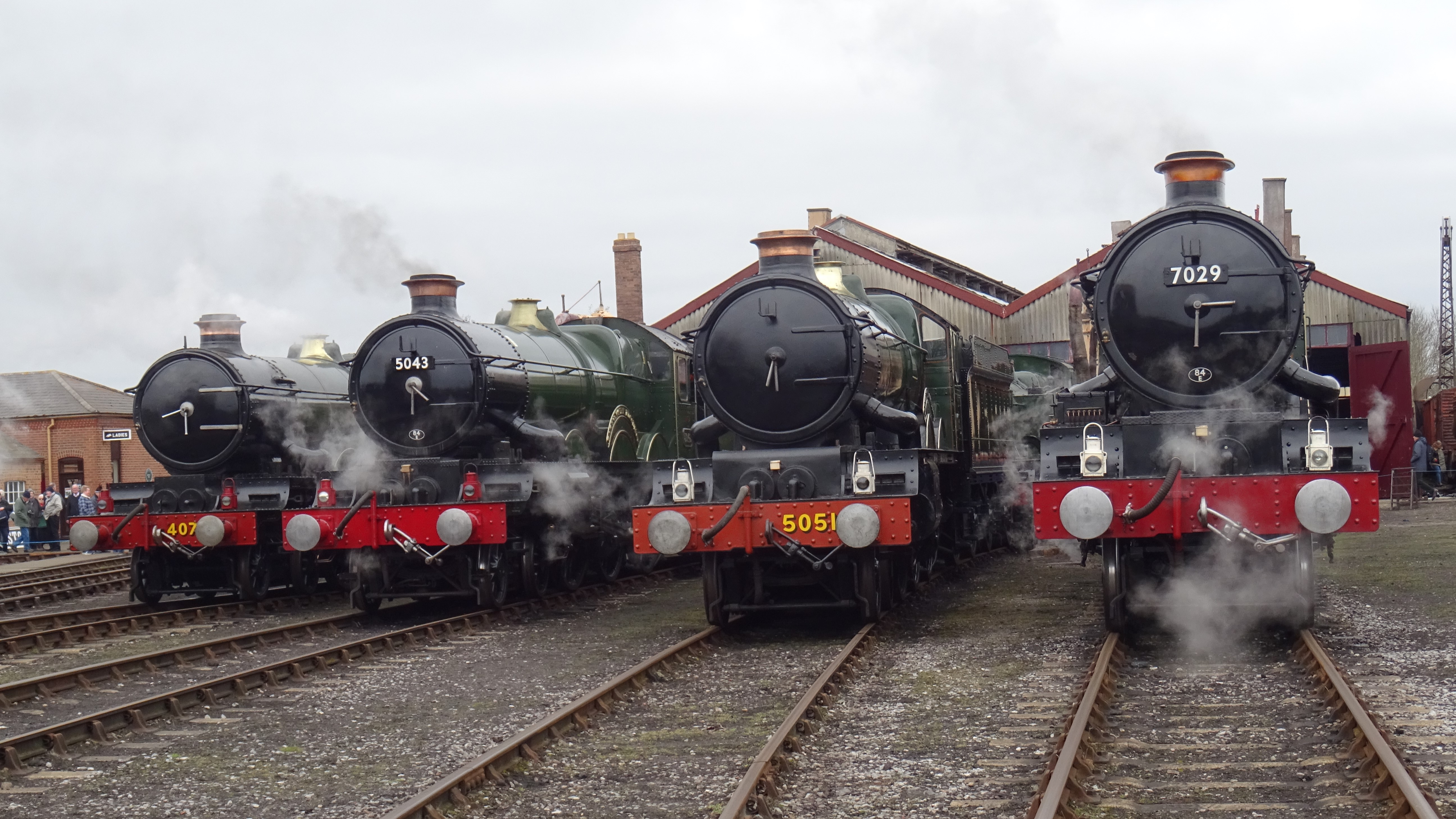
4 of the preserved Castle locomotives on display for the classes Centenary celebration at the Didcot Railway Centre, 4 March 2023

As of 2026, four Castles are operational. 5029, 5043 and 7029 have mainline certificates with 4079 restricted to only operate on heritage lines. 5080 is being overhauled, 5080 is due to have its boiler assessed to ascertain the cost of its overhaul; to speed up the engine's return to service only the boiler is to be overhauled while its bottom-end remains intact. The engine will only operate on heritage railways at first, but a full mechanical overhaul to mainline standards will be undertaken once enough money has been raised. The engine will eventually become part of Tyseley's pool of mainline certified alongside class members 5043 and 7029.

4079 was originally planned to operate on the mainline following completion of its overhaul, but Didcot later announced that they intended to stop operating on the mainline, running only on heritage railways. Upon completion of its restoration, 7027 is also intended to operate only on heritage railways, however debate over its restoration continued.

Image	Number	Name (Current in Bold)	Built	Renamed	Withdrawn	Chimney fitted	Tender fitted	Owner	Livery	Home Base	Current status	Mainline Certified	Notes
	4073	Caerphilly Castle	August 1923	–	May 1960	Single	Churchward	National Railway Museum	GWR Lined Green, Great Western Lettering	Museum of the Great Western Railway	On static display	No	
	4079	Pendennis Castle	February 1924	–	May 1964	Single	Collett	Great Western Society	GWR Lined Green, Garter Crest	Didcot Railway Centre	Operational, (Boiler Certificate 2021–31)	No	
	5029	Nunney Castle	May 1934	–	December 1963	Single	Hawksworth	Jeremy Hosking	GWR Lined Green, GW Lettering	Crewe Diesel TMD	Operational, (Boiler Certificate 2025-35)	Yes (2025-Ongoing)	As of June 2025, it was working mainline charters.
	5043	**Earl of Mount Edgcumbe** (Barbury Castle)	March 1936	September 1937	December 1963	Double	Hawksworth	Birmingham Railway Museum	BR Lined Green, Early Emblem	Tyseley Locomotive Works	Operational (Boiler Certificate 2023–33).	Yes (2023-Ongoing)	
	5051	Earl Bathurst (**Drysllwyn Castle**)	May 1936	August 1937	May 1963	Single	Collett	Great Western Society	GWR Lined Green, Shirtbutton Logo	Didcot Railway Centre	On static display	No	
	5080	**Defiant** (Ogmore Castle)	May 1939	January 1941	April 1963	Single	Collett	Birmingham Railway Museum	GWR Lined Green, GW Lettering (on completion)	Tyseley Locomotive Works	Undergoing mainline standard overhaul.	No, to be certified	5080's tender is undergoing overhaul with completion expected before the end of 2024 and 5080's boiler is due to be assessed in 2024 to ascertain the cost of an overhaul.
	7027	Thornbury Castle	August 1949	–	December 1963	Single	Hawksworth	Great Western Society's 4709 Group	BR Lined Green, TBC (on completion)	Great Central Railway	Stored	No	Initially undergoing restoration but now sold to the 4709 Group which intends to use the boiler in their project to re-create a GWR 4700 Class.
	7029	Clun Castle	May 1950	–	December 1965	Double	Collett	Birmingham Railway Museum	BR Lined Green, Late Crest	Tyseley Locomotive Works	Operational, boiler certificate 2017–27	Yes (2019-Ongoing)	
