= GWR 4700 Class =

Class of nine 2-8-0 steam locomotives

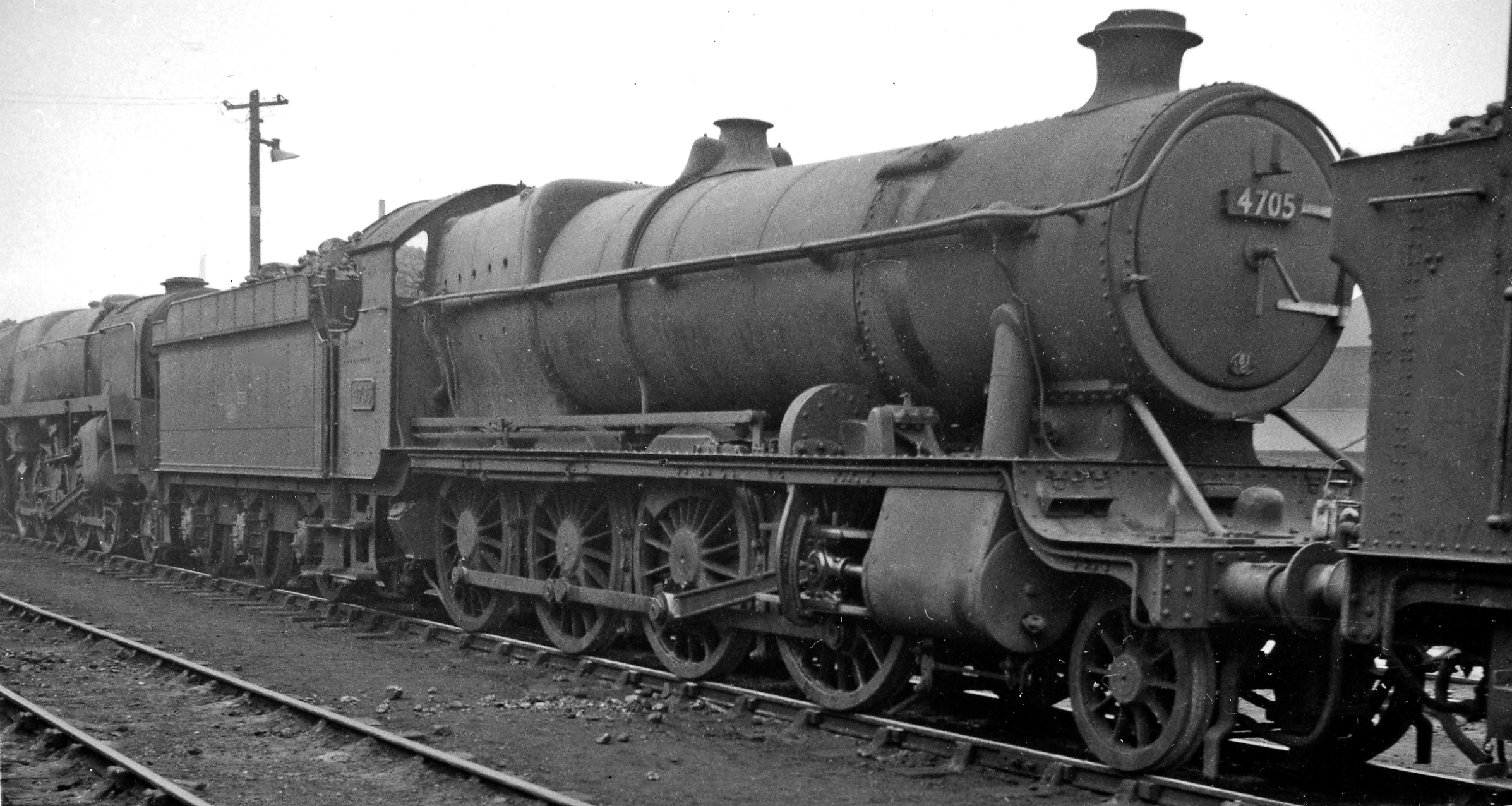
- 4705 at the Southall Locomotive Depot, in 1962
Type and origin
- Power type: Steam
- Designer: George Jackson Churchward
- Builder: GWR Swindon Works
- Order number: Lots 214, 221
- Serial number: 4700: 2866, 4701–4708: none
- Build date: 1919 (1), 1922–1923 (8)
- Total produced: 9
Specifications
- Configuration
  - Whyte: 2-8-0
  - UIC: 1'D h2
- Gauge: 4 ft 8 1/2 in (1,435 mm) standard gauge
- Leading dia.: 3 ft 2 in (0.965 m)
- Driver dia.: 5 ft 8 in (1.727 m)
- Minimum curve: 8 chains (530 ft; 160 m) normal, 7 chains (460 ft; 140 m) slow
- Length: 66 ft 4 1/4 in (20.22 m)
- Width: 8 ft 11 in (2.718 m)
- Height: 13 ft 4 3/4 in (4.083 m)
- Axle load: 19 long tons 12 cwt (43,900 lb or 19.9 t); 19 long tons 12 hundredweight (19.9 t; 22.0 short tons) full
- Adhesive weight: 73 long tons 8 cwt (164,400 lb or 74.6 t); 73 long tons 8 hundredweight (74.6 t; 82.2 short tons) full
- Loco weight: 82 long tons 0 cwt (183,700 lb or 83.3 t); 82 long tons 0 hundredweight (83.3 t; 91.8 short tons) full
- Tender weight: 46 long tons 14 cwt (104,600 lb or 47.4 t); 45 long tons 14 hundredweight (46.4 t; 51.2 short tons) full
- Fuel type: Coal
- Water cap.: 3,500 or 4,000 imperial gallons (16,000 or 18,000 L; 4,200 or 4,800 US gal)
- Firebox
  - Grate area: 30.28 sq ft (2.813 m^{2})
- Boiler: GWR Standard No. 7
- Boiler pressure: 225 lbf/in^{2} (1.55 MPa)
- Heating surface
  - Firebox: 169.75 sq ft (15.770 m^{2})
  - Tubes: 2,062.35 sq ft (191.599 m^{2})
- Superheater
  - Type: 4-element or 6-element
  - Heating area: 4-element: 211.20 sq ft (19.621 m^{2}), 6-element: 276.98 sq ft (25.732 m^{2})
- Cylinders: Two, outside
- Cylinder size: 19 in × 30 in (483 mm × 762 mm)
- Valve gear: Stephenson
- Valve type: Piston valves
Performance figures
- Tractive effort: 30,460 lbf (135.5 kN)
Career
- Operators: GWR » BR
- Class: 4700
- Power class: GWR: D, BR: 7F
- Numbers: 4700–4708
- Nicknames: Night Owls
- Axle load class: GWR: Red
- Withdrawn: 1962–1964
- Disposition: All original locomotives scrapped; one new-build under construction

The Great Western Railway (GWR) 4700 Class was a class of nine 2-8-0 steam locomotives, designed by George Jackson Churchward. They were introduced in 1919 for heavy mixed-traffic work. Although primarily designed for fast freight, the class also sometimes hauled passenger trains, notably heavy holiday expresses in the summer months. They were unofficially nicknamed "Night Owls" because they were primarily designed to haul goods during the night and they could be seen simmering in the daylight, awaiting their nocturnal duties.

== Background ==
At the end of the First World War, the running department of the GWR identified the need for a larger version of the successful GWR 4300 Class 2-6-0 incorporating the Swindon No. 1 boiler. They envisaged a smaller version of the successful Saint class 4-6-0 with 5 ft 8 in (1.727 m) driving wheels - the intermediate of Churchward's three standard wheel sizes, for express goods trains. However, Churchward preferred a 2-8-0 design for this purpose.

== Prototype ==
The prototype of the new class was built at Swindon Works in May 1919 (Lot 214) and was the last design by Churchward. It was numbered 4700. According to the RCTS monograph, the design was not successful as built because the No. 1 boiler proved to be inadequate for such a large engine. In May 1921, it was therefore rebuilt with a newly designed and larger Swindon No. 7 boiler. However, according to Cook it was built with a Standard No. 1 boiler as the intended design of the larger Standard No. 7 boiler, which was not yet ready.

== Production series ==
Eight further locomotives with the larger No. 7 boilers and detail differences were ordered by Churchward in 1921 (Lot 221), but these only appeared after his retirement. These were numbered 4701 to 4708. Although they were mechanically successful locomotives, their large size severely restricted their route availability and so no more examples were built. Churchward's successor Charles Collett later rebuilt a Saint Class with 6 ft 0 in (1.829 m) wheels to form the Hall Class which was a far more versatile mixed traffic locomotive. Later, Collett would produce the Grange Class which was exactly as the traffic department had originally envisaged: a 4-6-0 with Standard No. 1 boiler and 5 ft 8 in driving wheels. The class was originally fitted with 3,500 imperial gallons (16,000 L; 4,200 US gal) tenders but during 1933/4 these were replaced by 4,000 imperial gallons (18,000 L; 4,800 US gal) tenders.

== Use ==
The class were primarily used on fast overnight freight services on the London, Exeter and Plymouth, London–Bristol and London, Birmingham and Wolverhampton routes.

From 1957 onwards, several members of the class were often used on heavy Saturday relief passenger services to the West of England during the summer months, where they gained the Brunswick Green livery. Immediately previously they were either lined or unlined black.

Despite their limited use, the Night Owls were exceptional mixed traffic locomotives which proved their worth on the heavier express freight and passenger services.

== Accidents and incidents ==
- On 12 November 1958, locomotive No. 4707 was hauling a freight train when it overran signals and was derailed at Highworth Junction, Swindon, Wiltshire. A newspaper train, hauled by GWR 4073 Class 4-6-0 No. 5009 Shrewsbury Castle, collided with the wreckage.

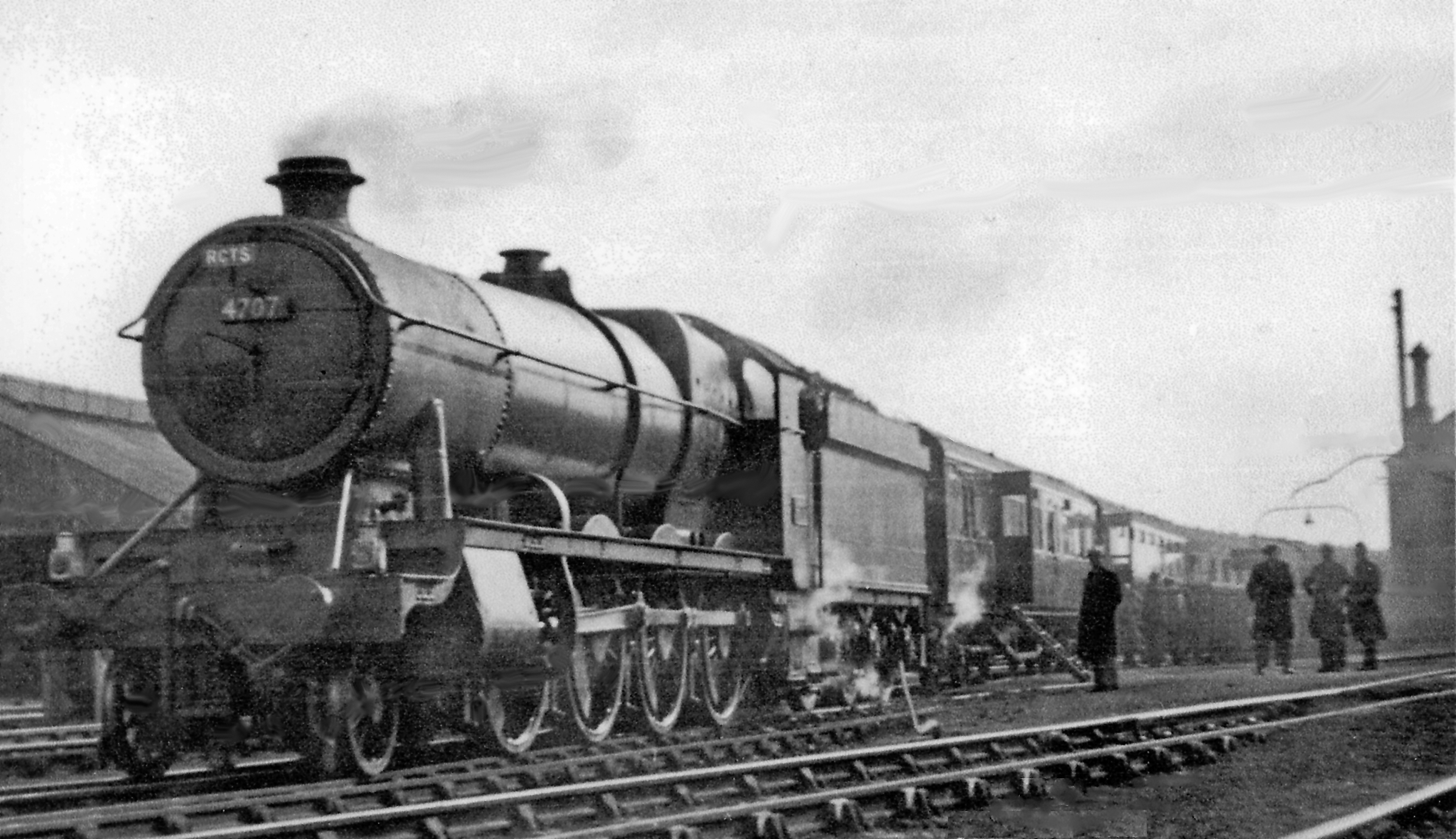
No. 4707 at Swindon Works 25 April 1954

== Withdrawal ==
Withdrawal of the class began in June 1962 with No. 4702, while the last were removed from service in May 1964. As a result of their limited usefulness, the mileages achieved by the class were not exceptional, with No. 4705 recording the greatest at 1,656,564 miles (2,665,981 km).

== Preservation ==
No members of the class were preserved. However, the Great Western Society 4709 Group made the decision to create the next locomotive in the sequence, GWR 4709. Supported via a GWS sub-group; the plan was to build it using a mixture of new parts and others recycled from former Barry scrapyard locomotives:

- GWR 5101 class 2-6-2T 4115 - six of the eight driving wheels and the frame extension.
- GWR 2800 class 2-8-0 2861 - the cylinder block.
- GWR 5205 class 2-8-0T 5227 - the axleboxes, horns and other various components.
- GWR 4073 Class 4-6-0 7027 Thornbury Castle - the boiler.

The plates for the new frames were cut and machined in 2012.

In order to fit within the more restrictive modern loading gauge, so that it could operate on the main line, the project has changed the plan to use the 2800 cylinder, and has instead had new cylinders designed and cast.

== See also ==
- List of GWR standard classes with two outside cylinders
