= GWR 4073 Class 4073 Caerphilly Castle =

Preserved GWR 4-6-0 steam locomotive

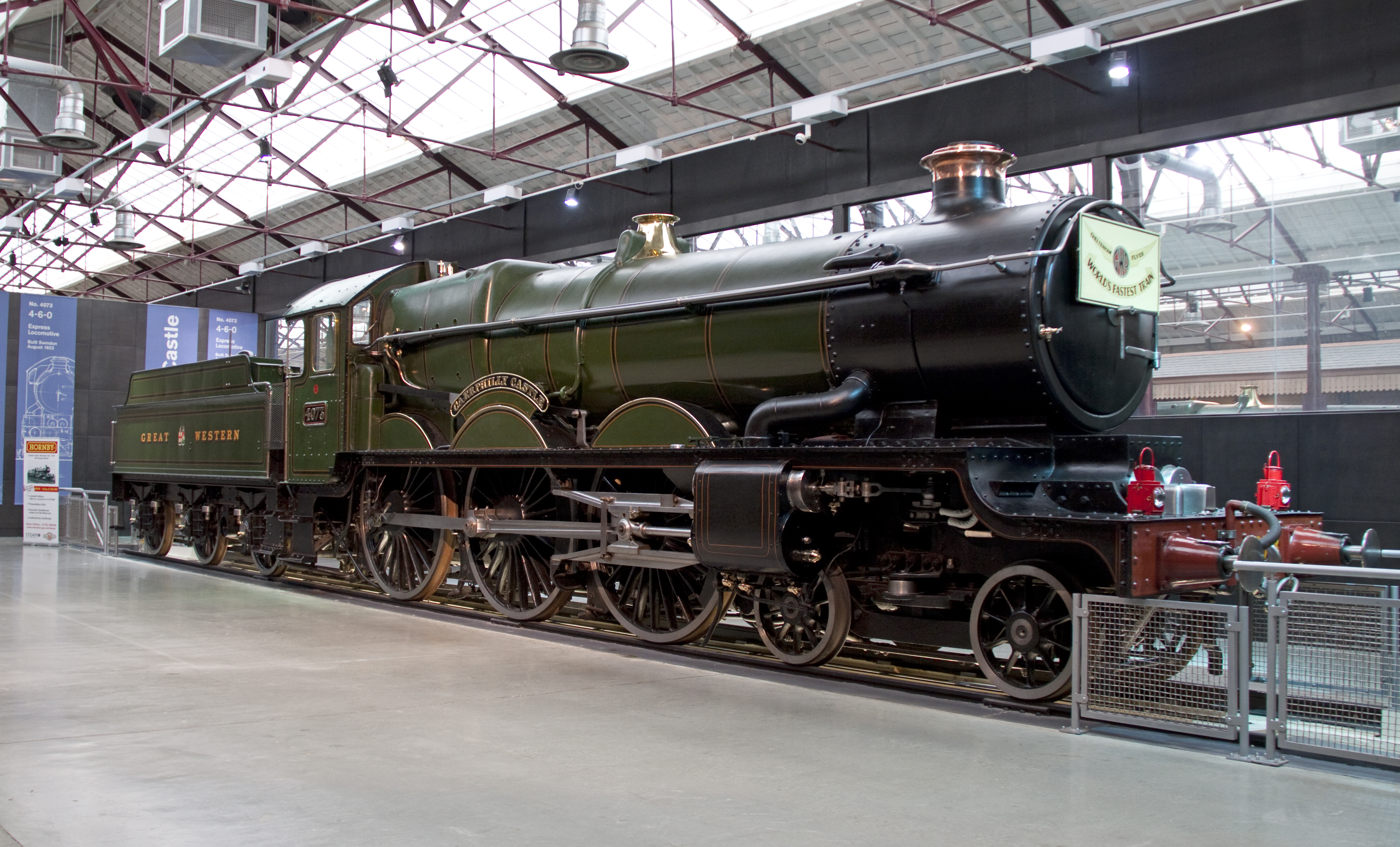
- Caerphilly Castle on static display in the STEAM museum in 2011. Note the GWR headboard for the Cheltenham Flyer.
Type and origin
- Power type: Steam
- Designer: Charles Collett
- Builder: BR Swindon Works
- Build date: 1923
Specifications
- Configuration
  - Whyte: 4-6-0
- Gauge: 4 ft 8 1/2 in (1,435 mm)
- Leading dia.: 3 ft 2 in (0.965 m)
- Driver dia.: 6 ft 8 1/2 in (2.045 m)
- Length: 65 ft 2 in (19.86 m) over buffers
- Width: 8 ft 11 in (2.718 m)
- Height: 13 ft 1 in (3.988 m) (Cut back from 13 ft 4 1/2 in (4.077 m))
- Loco weight: 79 long tons 17 cwt (178,900 lb or 81.1 t); 89.4 short tons full
- Tender weight: 47 long tons 6 cwt (106,000 lb or 48.1 t); 53.0 short tons full
- Fuel type: Coal
- Fuel capacity: 6 long tons 0 cwt (13,400 lb or 6.1 t); 6 long tons 0 hundredweight (6.10 t; 6.72 short tons)
- Water cap.: 4,000 imp gal (18,000 L; 4,800 US gal)
- Firebox
  - Grate area: 29.36 sq ft (2.728 m^{2})
- Boiler: GWR Standard Number 8
- Boiler pressure: 225 lbf/in^{2} (1.55 MPa)
- Heating surface
  - Firebox: 162.7 sq ft (15.12 m^{2}) (Collett); 163.5 sq ft (15.19 m^{2}) (Hawksworth)
  - Tubes: 1,857.7 sq ft (172.59 m^{2}) (Collett); 1,799.5 sq ft (167.18 m^{2}) (Hawksworth)
- Cylinders: Four (two inside, two outside)
- Cylinder size: 16 in × 26 in (406 mm × 660 mm)
- Valve gear: Inside cylinders: Walschaerts; Outside cylinders: derived from inside cylinders via rocking bars.
- Valve type: Piston valves
- Train heating: Steam heating
- Loco brake: Vacuum brake
Performance figures
- Maximum speed: 45 mph (72 km/h) - (mainline, tender first) 75 mph (121 km/h) - (mainline, chimney first)
- Tractive effort: 31,625 lbf (140.68 kN)
Career
- Operators: Great Western Railway; British Railways
- Power class: GWR: D BR: 7P
- Axle load class: GWR: Red
- Withdrawn: 1960
- Current owner: National Railway Museum
- Disposition: Static display

GWR 4073 Castle class 4073 Caerphilly Castle is a steam locomotive completed in August 1923. It is a 4-6-0 standard gauge locomotive built to a design by Charles Collett, it was the first member of its class to be constructed. It operated on the British mainline from construction until the end of steam on Britain's railway network in 1960, after which it was preserved as part of the National Railway Museum's National Collection. As of March 2025, Caerphilly Castle is on static display at the Museum of the Great Western Railway in Swindon.

In 1924, Caerphilly Castle was displayed at the British Empire Exhibition alongside the LNER's Flying Scotsman, and was subsequently involved in comparative trials against the locomotive.

== Operation ==
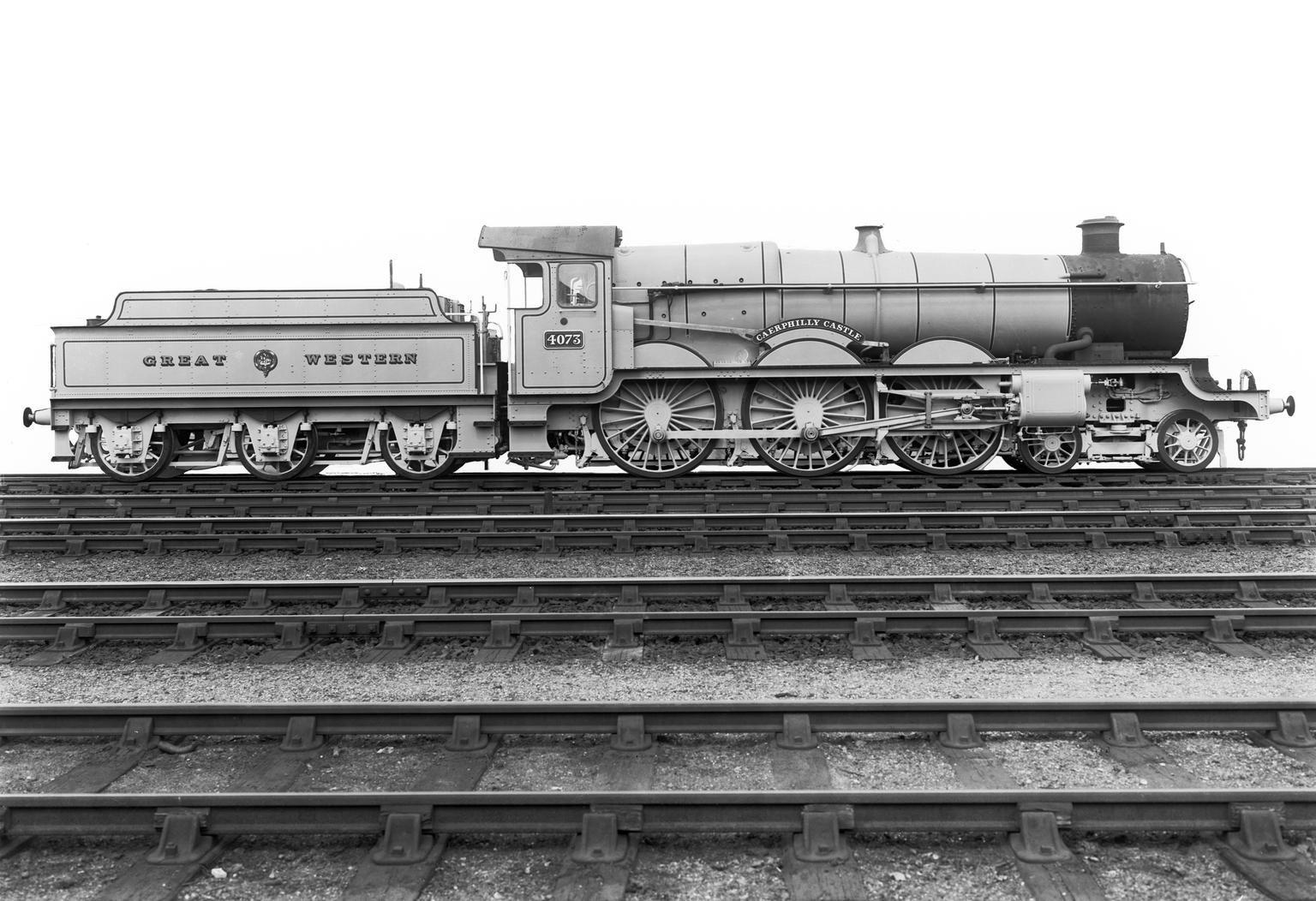
4073 Caerphilly Castle when new.

Following a brief period of running-in and testing, Caerphilly Castle's first shed allocation was Old Oak Common, where it began hauling express passenger trains, a duty which it would continue to perform as its primary operation throughout its 37 year career. Its last shed allocation was Cardiff Canton in March 1959. After running nearly 2 million miles on Britain's railway network, it was withdrawn for preservation in the National Collection in 1960.

== Display at the British Empire Exhibition ==
Between April and October 1924, the locomotive was exhibited alongside the LNER's Flying Scotsman at the British Empire Exhibition, which was held at Wembley Park, north-west London.

As part of their exhibition, the GWR claimed that the then-new Castle was the “Most powerful express passenger locomotive in Britain”, a claim also made by the LNER about their engine. The conflicting claims would lead the two companies to perform comparative trials between Caerphilly Castle and Flying Scotsman. The Castle proved the better locomotive due to its lesser coal and water consumption despite faster speeds compared to the LNER's engine, proving the GWR's claim.

== Preservation ==
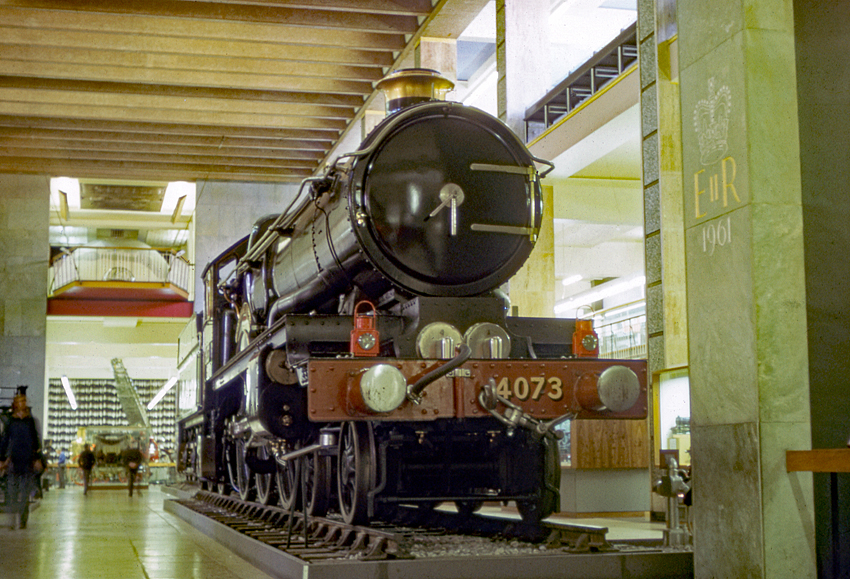
4073 Caerphilly Castle in the Science Museum at Kensington.

Withdrawn in May 1960, Caerphilly Castle was made part of the National Collection due to its historical significance being the first member of the 4073 Castle class, and its ability to demonstrate the design of the GWR's Castle class to "future generations". After being cosmetically refurbished at Swindon Works, on 2 June 1961, it was formally handed over from British Railways by Dr Richard Beeching at Paddington Station to the director of the Kensington Science Museum. The engine was subsequently hauled by road through London from Park Royal Goods Depot to the Science Museum on Sunday 4 June 1961. Caerphilly Castle was placed on static display in the then-new land transport gallery.

After the Science Museum decided to refurbish the gallery, and therefore no longer had a space to exhibit the locomotive, the National Railway Museum agreed to loan the locomotive to the then-new Museum of the GWR at Swindon. Due to this, after a period on display at the National Railway Museum, 4073 Caerphilly Castle was moved to Swindon in December 1999, to be displayed in the buildings in which it was constructed. Caerphilly Castle remains on static display in Swindon as of March 2025.
