= GWR 4073 Class 5029 Nunney Castle =

Preserved British steam locomotive

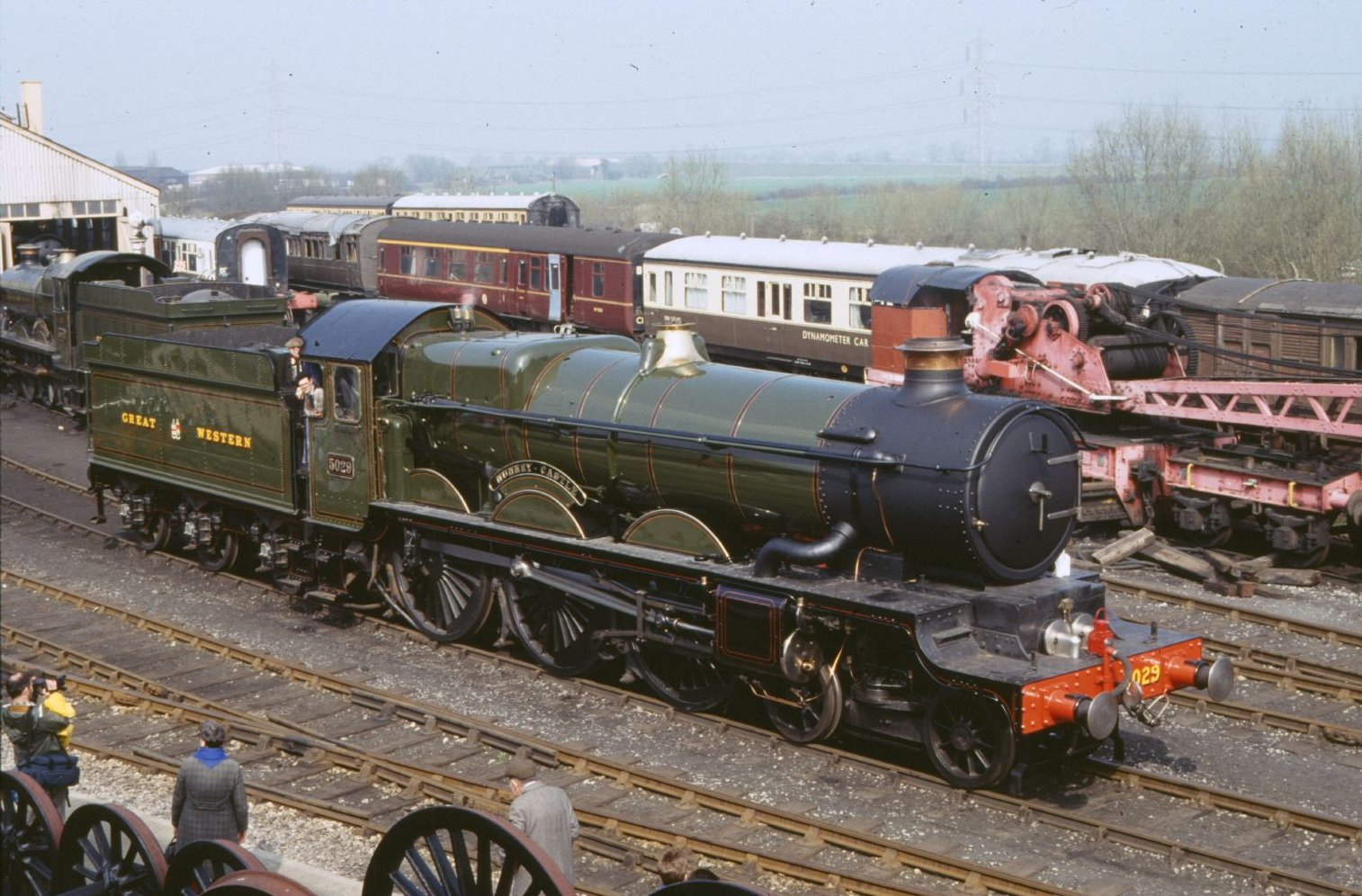
5029 Nunney Castle seen in preservation at Didcot Railway Centre in the 1980s.

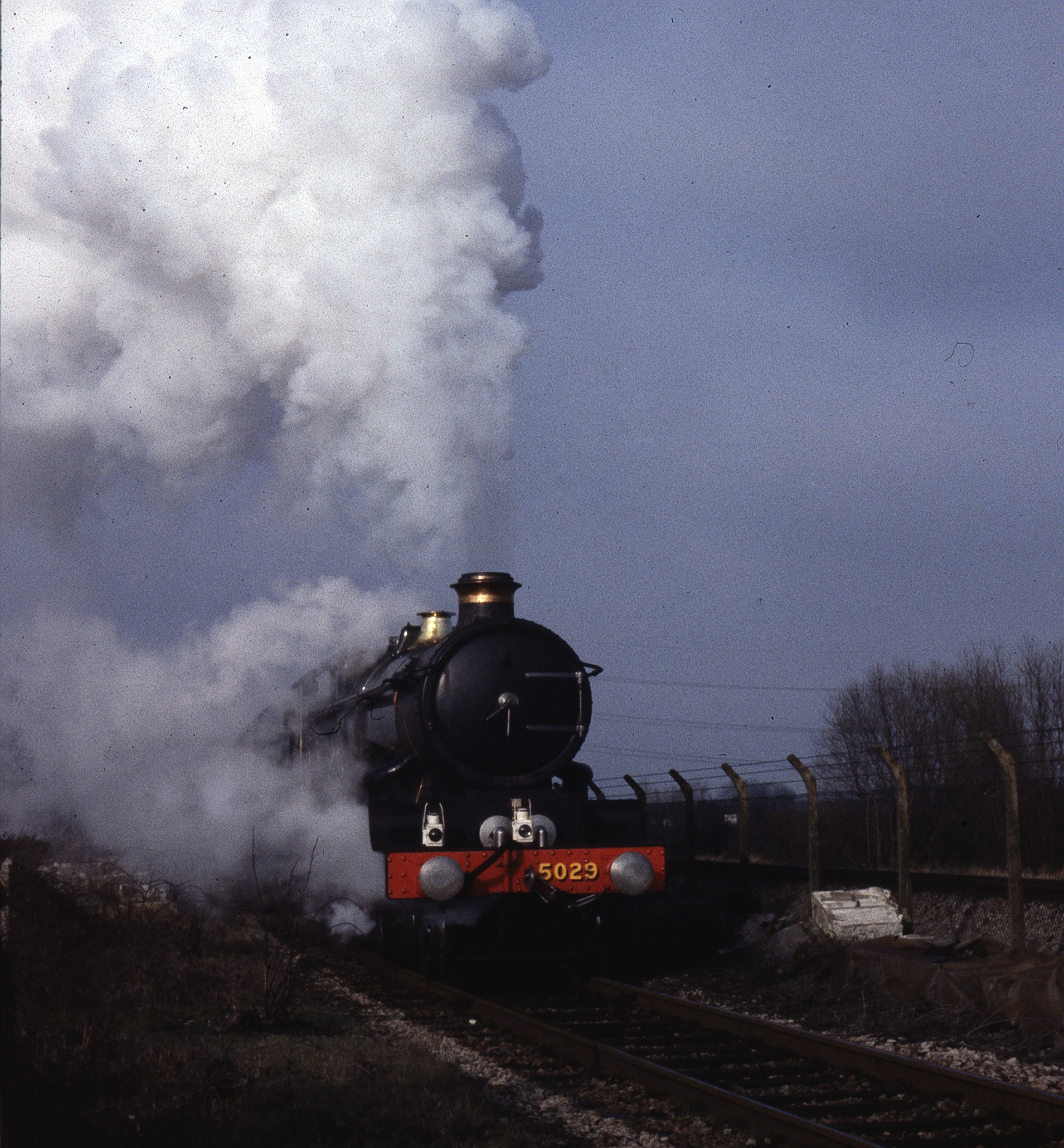
5029 Nunney Castle at speed, 1980s photo

Nunney Castle steam special passing through Dorchester West on its return from Weymouth to Bath 14 August 2011

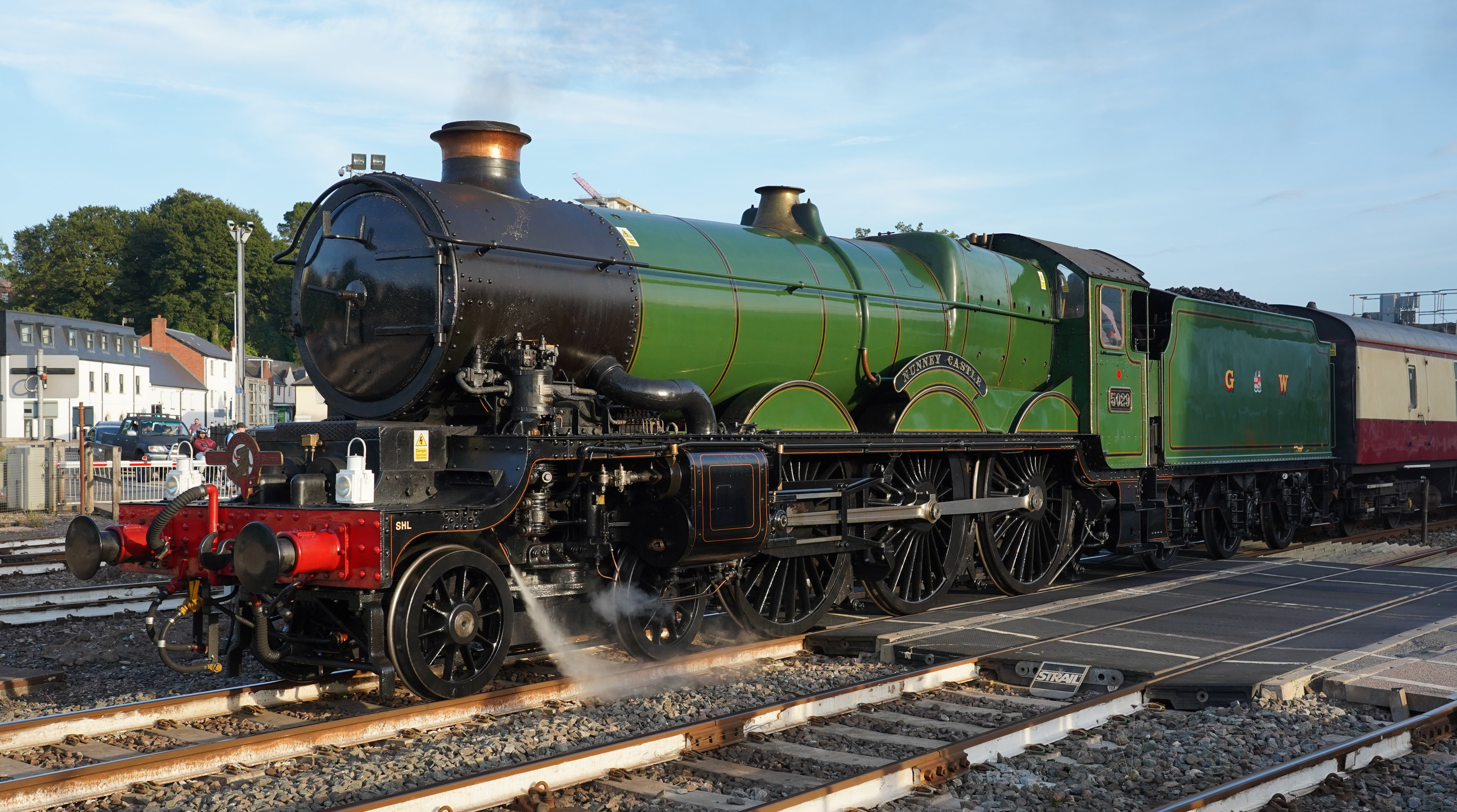
5029 Nuuney Castle departing from Exeter St David's in September 2025 with the return leg of a Kingswear railtour

GWR 4073 Class 5029 Nunney Castle is a Great Western Railway Castle Class steam locomotive. It was built at the GWR's Swindon Works in 1934, being outshopped on 28 May and being named after Nunney Castle near Frome, Somerset. The locomotive was used in many publicity and "life on the railway" type of photographs. During the first day of the evacuation of civilians during World War II, the locomotive hauled trains carrying children being taken from London to the safety of the countryside. Nunney Castle was also used to haul the Royal Train in October 1957 from London Paddington station to Gloucester.

== Allocation ==
No. 5029 was initially allocated to Old Oak Common MPD (code PDN/81A) in West London where it spent most of its working life. The engine moved to Worcester in 1958, then had spells at Newton Abbot and Laira before a final transfer in December 1962 took it to Cardiff East Dock, where it remained until being withdrawn along with other members of its class in December 1963.

== Sale and restoration ==
Nunney Castle was sold in 1964 to Woodham Brothers at Barry, Vale of Glamorgan, arriving at the famous scrap yard in June. After 12 years at Barry, it was sold to a consortium consisting of private individuals (50%) and the Great Western Society at Didcot Railway Centre (50%). It was rescued from Woodham's in May 1976, and was the last loco to leave Barry scrapyard by rail. The loco returned to the main line in 1990. In the mid-1990s, the private consortium took total control and the loco left Didcot for a life on the main line. After sale to Jeremy Hosking and a further overhaul, the locomotive returned to the main line in April 2008. In 2020, it was awaiting overhaul at Crewe. As of June 2025, it was working mainline charters.
