= GWR 4073 Class 7027 Thornbury Castle =

Preserved British 4-6-0 locomotive

GWR 7027 Thornbury Castle
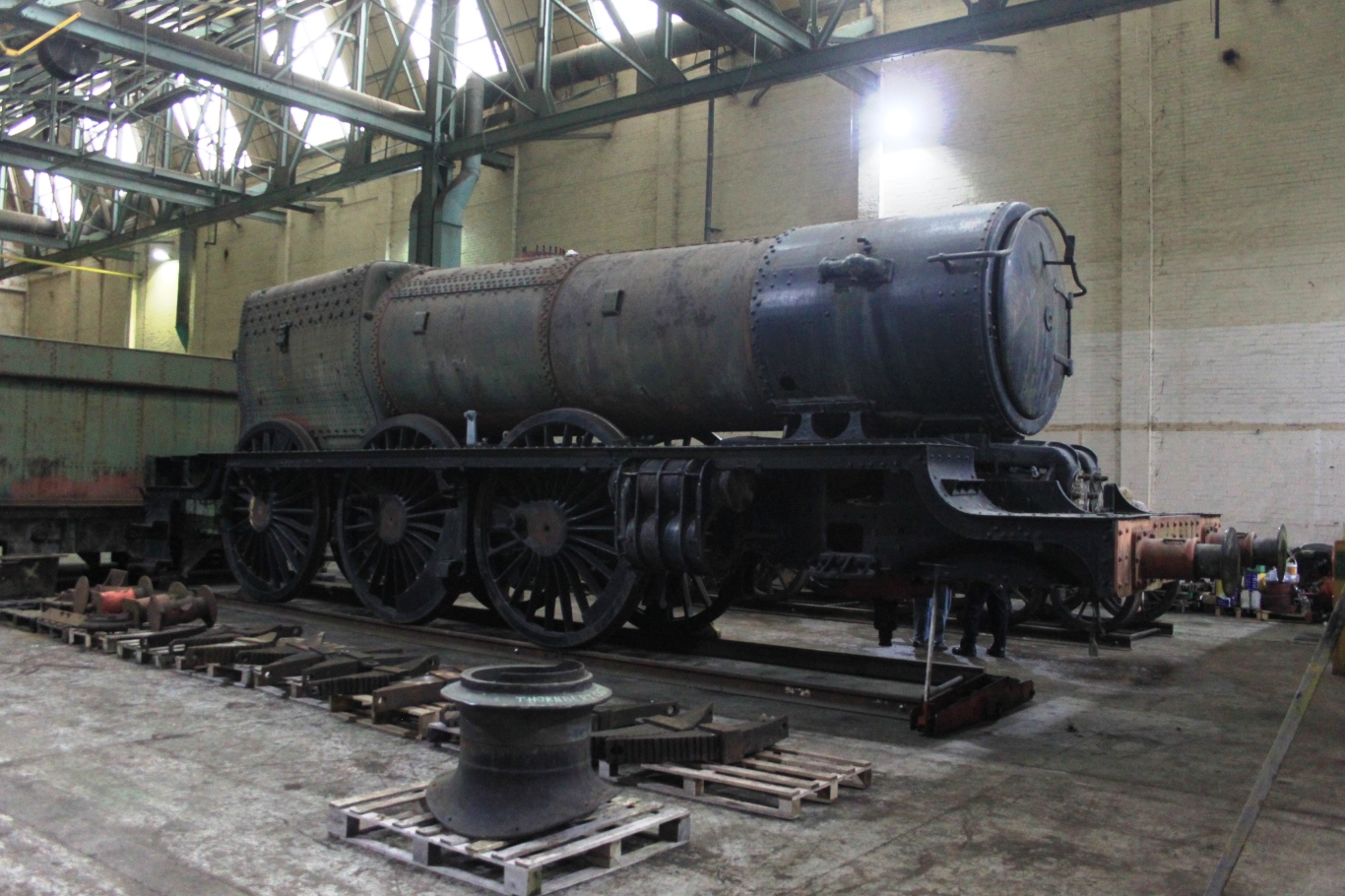
- 7027 Thornbury Castle undergoing restoration at Weston-super-Mare, 2016
Type and origin
- Power type: Steam
- Designer: Charles Collett
- Builder: BR Swindon Works
- Build date: August 1949
Specifications
- Configuration
  - Whyte: 4-6-0
  - UIC: 2′C h4
- Gauge: 4 ft 8 1/2 in (1,435 mm)
- Leading dia.: 3 ft 2 in (0.965 m)
- Driver dia.: 6 ft 8 1/2 in (2.045 m)
- Length: 65 ft 2 in (19.86 m) over buffers
- Width: 8 ft 11 in (2.718 m)
- Height: 13 ft 1 in (3.988 m) (Cut back from 13 ft 4 1/2 in (4.077 m))
- Loco weight: 79 long tons 17 cwt (178,900 lb or 81.1 t); 89.4 short tons full
- Tender weight: 47 long tons 6 cwt (106,000 lb or 48.1 t); 53.0 short tons full
- Fuel type: Coal
- Fuel capacity: 6 long tons 0 cwt (13,400 lb or 6.1 t); 6 long tons 0 hundredweight (6.10 t; 6.72 short tons)
- Water cap.: 4,000 imp gal (18,000 L; 4,800 US gal)
- Firebox
  - Grate area: 29.36 sq ft (2.728 m^{2})
- Boiler: GWR Standard Number 8
- Boiler pressure: 225 lbf/in^{2} (1.55 MPa)
- Heating surface
  - Firebox: 162.7 sq ft (15.12 m^{2}) (Collett); 163.5 sq ft (15.19 m^{2}) (Hawksworth)
  - Tubes: 1,857.7 sq ft (172.59 m^{2}) (Collett); 1,799.5 sq ft (167.18 m^{2}) (Hawksworth)
- Cylinders: Four (two inside, two outside)
- Cylinder size: 16 in × 26 in (406 mm × 660 mm)
- Valve gear: Inside cylinders: Walschaerts; Outside cylinders: derived from inside cylinders via rocking bars.
- Valve type: Piston valves
- Loco brake: Vacuum
Performance figures
- Maximum speed: 25mph - (heritage railways) 45mph - (mainline, tender first) 75mph - (mainline, chimney first)
- Tractive effort: 31,625 lbf (140.68 kN)
Career
- Operators: British Railways
- Power class: GWR: D BR: 7P
- Axle load class: GWR: Red
- Withdrawn: December 1963
- Current owner: Great western society
- Disposition: Under restoration

7027 Thornbury Castle is a steam locomotive of the GWR 'Castle' Class, built in August 1949. Its first shed allocation was Plymouth Laira. Its March 1959 shed allocation was Old Oak Common. Its last shed allocation was Reading. It was withdrawn in December 1963 and arrived at Woodham Brothers scrapyard in Barry, South Wales in May 1964. Stored at various locations for 50+ years, the locomotive has now been broken up with the boiler to be used for a 47XX freight locomotive.

== Preservation ==
7027 was sold to the then Birmingham Railway Museum and left as the 23rd departure from Barry in August 1972. After being purchased by Pete Waterman's Transport Trust, she was stored outside the Crewe Heritage Centre in her Barry scrapyard condition. Some parts of 7027 are currently in use on elder sibling 5043 Earl of Mount Edgcumbe and one set of name and number plates for 7027 are mounted on a wall of the main hall of The Castle School in Thornbury, South Gloucestershire. Following the removal of Waterman's railway equipment from the former LNWR site in 2016, she was moved to Peak Rail in April 2016.

In July 2016, 7027 was purchased from the Waterman Trust for an undisclosed sum by Jon Jones-Pratt, owner of 4936 Kinlet Hall and the revived Crosville Motor Services, who planned to restore the engine to full mainline standards. Restoration started at the Crosville depot in Weston-super-Mare. In February 2018, agreement was reached between the West Somerset Railway and Jones-Pratt for Thornbury Castle to be moved to Williton, to be restored there over a six-year period. In January 2020 7027 was sold by Jones-Pratt to a private individual who intended to restore the engine for use at the Great Central Railway. The engine was planned not be mainline certified on completion.

An April 2020 report stated that restoration had started; the project was headed up by the chief mechanical engineer of Great Central Railway, Craig Stinchcombe. Reports and photographs posted in 2022 indicated that restoration was well underway.

In August 2022, the future restoration of Thornbury Castle was called into question when the Great Western Society's 4709 Group bought the locomotive with the intention of donating the boiler to its project to re-create a GWR 4700 Class. Thornbury Castle's chassis and other components were to be used to recreate a GWR Star class locomotive, and eventually rebuilding it back into Thornbury Castle when a No. 7 or No. 8 boiler was available in the future. However, in September 2022, those plans were cancelled. The GWS said that Thornbury Castle could be rebuilt in its own right if someone buys the spare parts.

In May 2023 The Railway Magazine reported that the use of the Castle's boiler for the Night Owl project had been confirmed in an announcement on 24 April by Richard Croucher of the 4709 Group. As a result the magazine reported savings of £500,000 would be made by the project and it would see a time saving of five years.
