= GWR 4073 Class 7029 Clun Castle =

English steam locomotive

GWR 7029 Clun Castle
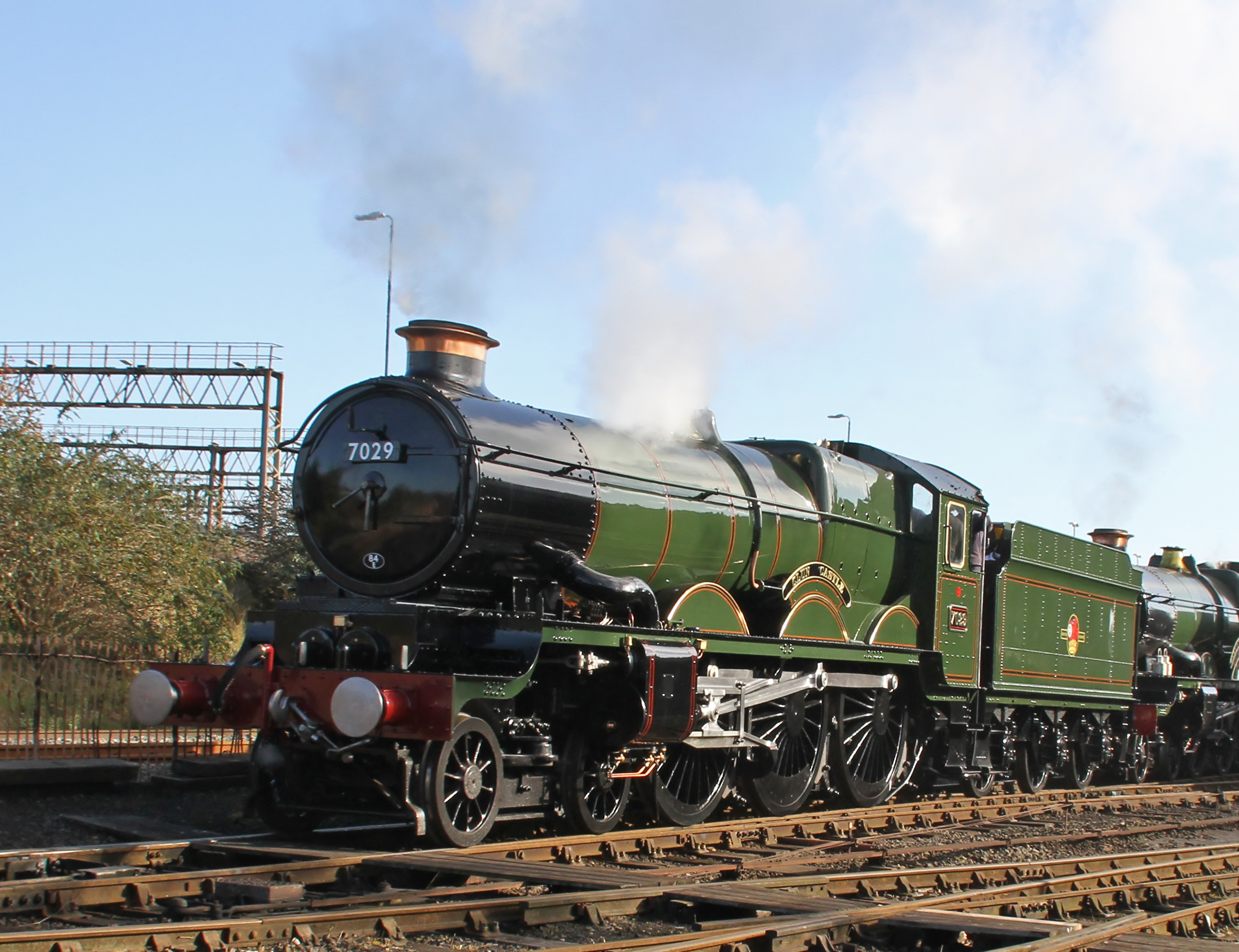
- Clun Castle in 2017
Type and origin
- Power type: Steam
- Designer: Charles Collett
- Builder: BR Swindon Works
- Build date: May 1950
Specifications
- Configuration
  - Whyte: 4-6-0
- Gauge: 4 ft 8 1/2 in (1,435 mm)
- Leading dia.: 3 ft 2 in (0.965 m)
- Driver dia.: 6 ft 8 1/2 in (2.045 m)
- Length: 65 ft 2 in (19.86 m) over buffers
- Width: 8 ft 11 in (2.718 m)
- Height: 13 ft 1 in (3.988 m) (Cut back from 13 ft 4 1/2 in (4.077 m))
- Loco weight: 79 long tons 17 cwt (178,900 lb or 81.1 t); 89.4 short tons full
- Tender weight: 47 long tons 6 cwt (106,000 lb or 48.1 t); 53.0 short tons full
- Fuel type: Coal
- Fuel capacity: 6 long tons 0 cwt (13,400 lb or 6.1 t); 6 long tons 0 hundredweight (6.10 t; 6.72 short tons)
- Water cap.: 4,000 imp gal (18,000 L; 4,800 US gal)
- Firebox
  - Grate area: 29.36 sq ft (2.728 m^{2})
- Boiler: GWR Standard Number 8
- Boiler pressure: 225 lbf/in^{2} (1.55 MPa)
- Heating surface
  - Firebox: 162.7 sq ft (15.12 m^{2}) (Collett); 163.5 sq ft (15.19 m^{2}) (Hawksworth)
  - Tubes: 1,857.7 sq ft (172.59 m^{2}) (Collett); 1,799.5 sq ft (167.18 m^{2}) (Hawksworth)
- Cylinders: Four (two inside, two outside)
- Cylinder size: 16 in × 26 in (406 mm × 660 mm)
- Valve gear: Inside cylinders: Walschaerts; Outside cylinders: derived from inside cylinders via rocking bars.
- Valve type: Piston valves
- Loco brake: Vacuum
Performance figures
- Tractive effort: 31,625 lbf (140.68 kN)
Career
- Operators: Great Western Railway; British Railways
- Power class: GWR: D BR: 7P
- Axle load class: GWR: Red
- Withdrawn: December 1965
- Current owner: Tyseley Locomotive Works
- Disposition: Operational, Mainline Certified

GWR 4073 Class No. 7029 Clun Castle is a 4-6-0 steam locomotive built at Swindon Works in May 1950 to a design by Charles Collett for operation on the Western Region of British Railways. It was named after Clun Castle in Shropshire.

== British Railways ==
Its first shed allocation was Newton Abbot. It had a double chimney and a four-row superheater fitted in October 1959. Its most famous moment came on 9 May 1964 on the Plymouth to Bristol leg of a special train marked Z48, which ran to mark the record set 60 years earlier by City of Truro. 7029 managed to reach 96 mph on the descent of Wellington Bank in Somerset. Preserved classmate 4079 Pendennis Castle, which worked the Paddington to Westbury leg of the tour before melting its firebars, has also been preserved. Its last shed allocation was at Gloucester in May 1965. It hauled the last official steam train out of Paddington to Banbury on 11 June 1965. It was officially withdrawn from service in December that year.

Shed allocations
Location	Shed code	From
Newton Abbot	83A	31 May 1950
Plymouth Laira	83D	29 December 1956
Newton Abbot	83A	23 March 1957
Old Oak Common	81A	2 July 1962
Gloucester Horton Road	85B	5 October 1964

== Preservation ==
Sold for scrap at £2,400 to Patrick Whitehouse in 1966, its ownership then passed to 7029 Clun Castle Ltd. In preservation, it has been based at Tyseley Locomotive Works, where it was integral in the founding and operation of Vintage Trains.

In 1967, carrying a Great Western livery, it hauled trains to mark the closure of the GWR route to Birkenhead, from King's Cross to Newcastle and over the Settle-Carlisle Line. In 1972, it joined in the "Return to Steam" tours. After a major overhaul, it emerged in British Railways livery in 1985. In 1986, it hauled the last train from the old Birmingham Moor Street station. In the mid-1980s, some of the restoration work was undertaken by a government funded Community Programme scheme, managed by Sandwell Metropolitan Borough Council.

7029 returned to service in October 2017 at the Tyseley Open Weekend in BR Lined Green with the late crest on its tender, although fitted out with the necessary equipment the engine was not certified for mainline use. Clun Castle made its first moves on the mainline for 31 years in February 2019 when it went out on its light test runs, which included a trip to Stratford upon Avon. Its loaded test run was to follow before working its first mainline train since October 1988.

On 1 November 2025, 7029 hauled an anniversary railtour called "Farewell to Steam" from London Paddington to Bristol Temple Meads and then returned from Bristol to Birmingham New Street. The section from Birmingham to Bristol was diesel hauled. The tour marked the 60th anniversary since the original special took place on 27 November 1965 using the same locomotive and same route. The locomotive carried a copy of the 1965 headboard and like the 1965 tour had GWR style 7029 numbers on its front buffer beam. In a statement from Michael Whitehouse regarding the tour: "Same loco, same route, 60 years on. This was not 'Farewell' but a celebration of main line steam's continuing existence".

== Bibliography ==
- Cadge, Richard (general ed.) (1985). Portrait of a record-breaker: the story of GWR No. 7029 "Clun Castle". Birmingham Railway Museum.
