= Liskeard and Caradon Railway =

UK railway company

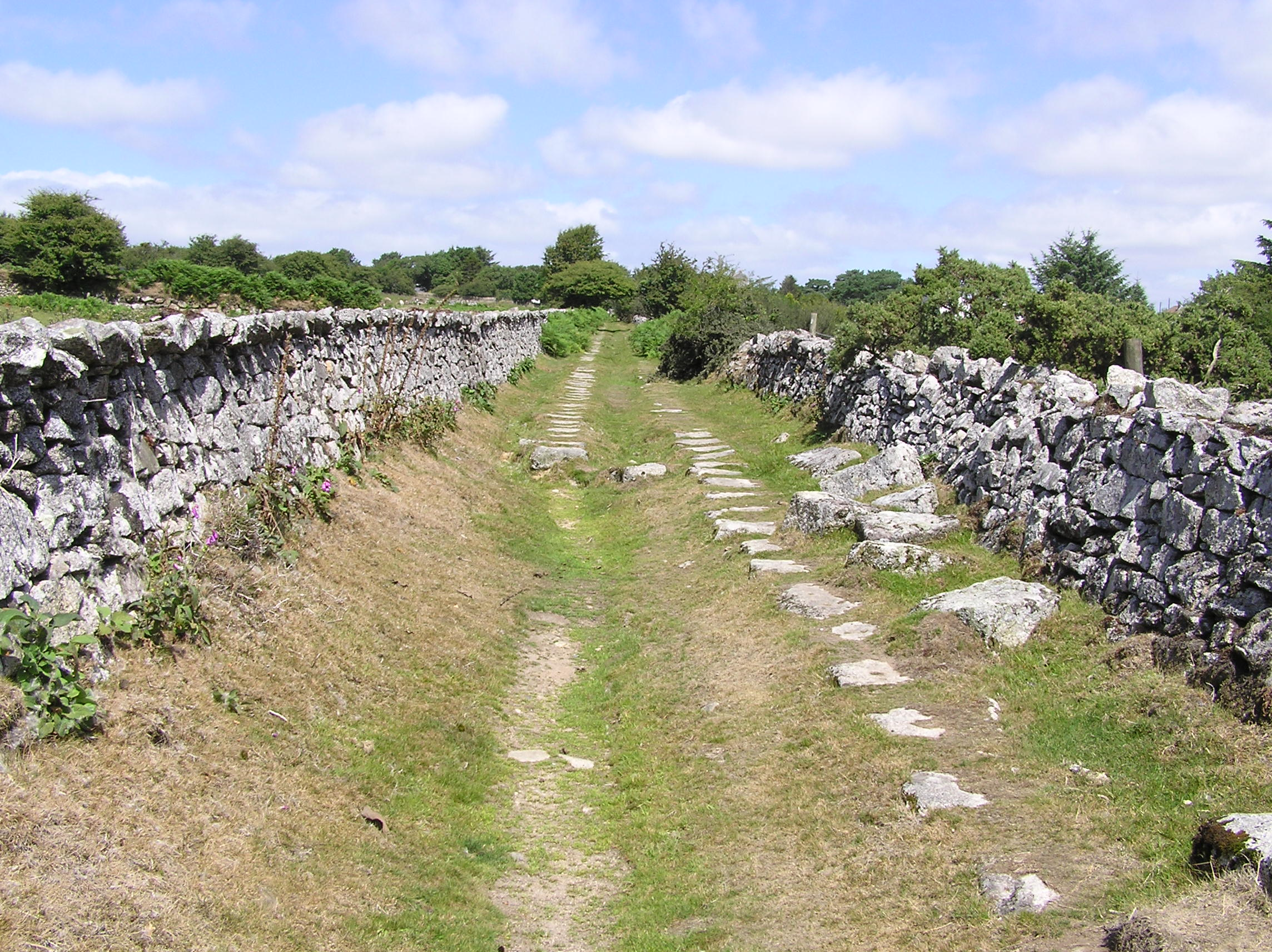
Remains of stone block track south of Minions

The Liskeard and Caradon Railway (L&CR) (Cornish: Hyns-horn Lyskerrys ha Karn) was a mineral railway in Cornwall, in the United Kingdom, which opened in 1844. It was built to carry the ores of copper and tin, and also granite, from their sources on Caradon Hill down to Moorswater for onward transport to market by way of Looe Harbour and coastal shipping. At first this was on the Liskeard and Looe Union Canal and later on the parallel Liskeard and Looe Railway.

The Liskeard and Caradon Railway was exceedingly successful while mineral extraction boomed, but it was entirely dependent on that traffic and when the mines and quarries declined, the railway declined too, and eventually failed financially. In 1909 it was purchased by the Great Western Railway, but its days were already numbered, and it closed in 1917, its track materials being removed in aid of the war effort.

== Origins ==
Traces of copper ore had been discovered in streams for some time, but the turning point was the discovery of copper ore at South Caradon in 1836 by James Clymo and Thomas Kittow. The discovery encouraged the search for the lodes nearby, and in due course these other locations were successfully producing ore. In 1839 granite also was being quarried at the Cheesewring nearby. The heavy minerals needed to be transported to remote markets, and this implied getting them to the coast, for onward transport by coastal shipping. While some material went to St Germans and to the River Fowey, the most convenient route was to Moorswater, where the Liskeard and Looe Union Canal had its basin, giving easy connection from there to Looe Harbour. The transport of the ore cost 4s 6d per ton to get to Moorswater; the granite from Cheesewring cost 8s.

By this time, many railways were being successfully operated elsewhere in the country, and in 1842 a committee of interested businessmen proposed a railway to bring the minerals down from Caradon. Robert Coad was the engineer of the neighbouring canal, and he was asked to prepare an appraisal of the possibilities. His report was presented on 25 June 1842, recommending a mineral railway between the canal at Liskeard and the Caradon Mines, Cheesewring and Tokenbury. The railway was to be capable of gravity operation for the loaded direction, so that the proposed route followed a broadly constant downward gradient at the expense of directness; locomotive or horse power would convey the empty wagons upwards. The line would operate as a toll road, open to independent carriers, with the railway not acting as carrier itself.

Liskeard and Caradon Railway Act 1843
- Act of Parliament
- Parliament of the United Kingdom
- Long title: An Act for making a Railway from Lamellion Bridge, in the Parish of Liskeard, to Tokenbury Corner, in the Parish of Linkinhorne, with a Branch Railway from Crow's Nest to Cheesewring, all in the County of Cornwall.
- Citation: 6 & 7 Vict. c. xliii

Dates
- Royal assent: 27 June 1843

Captain William Moorsom was engineer to the Cornwall Railway (then being planned) was asked to review Coad's proposals; he approved, with the sole adjustment that horse power would be preferable. The proposed railway swiftly obtained approval in Parliament, with royal assent being given to the Liskeard and Caradon Railway Act 1843 (6 & 7 Vict. c. xliii) on 26 June 1843. The capital of the Liskeard and Caradon Railway Company was to be £12,000 in £25 shares, with authority to borrow £4,000. Horse power was specified in the act, with a £50 penalty for crossing any turnpike road with a locomotive.

The act had a remarkable 344 clauses and incorporation of the company took place the following day, 27 June 1843.

== Construction ==
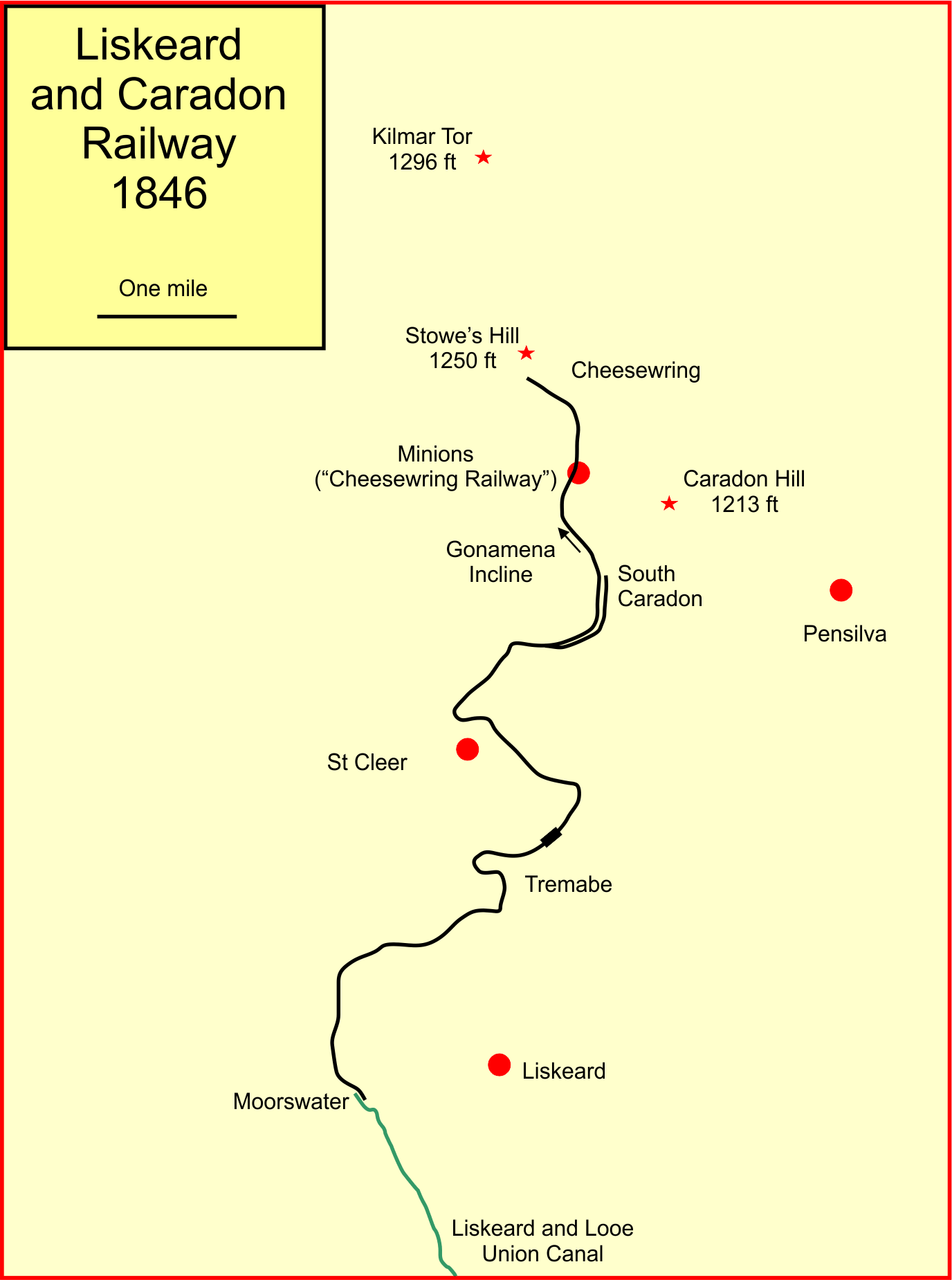
Liskeard and Caradon Railway: the first lines to 1846

Construction started at once; it seems that it was mostly carried out by direct labour under Coad's control. Some modifications to the route were required as Coad's original alignment was found to be impracticable in certain details. Work started at the Cheesewring, and the permanent way used stone block sleepers, the stone blocks being procured at Cheesewring itself. Lower down, serious problems were encountered in gaining possession of land from the Duchy of Cornwall, who were demanding very high prices for the land. The railway construction was costing more than had been estimated, and at the same time some subscribers were not responding to calls on shares they had taken up. The company found itself unable to pay the Duchy's price.

Loans were taken out – apparently beyond what was authorised in the act – and to obtain some income the company decided to open the railway as far as they could, down to Tremabe, on 28 November 1844. It is not clear how attractive the short railway transit was, involving an additional trans-shipment to road transport there.

The line was finally extended to Moorswater, opening about 8 March 1846 – the date is not certain. The proposed Tokenbury branch was not built, no doubt due to lack of funds. The tunnels originally contemplated were also avoided, but there was a rope worked incline at Gonamena to climb towards Cheesewring.

Liskeard and Caradon Railway Amendment Act 1847
- Act of Parliament
- Parliament of the United Kingdom
- Long title: An Act to enable the Liskeard and Caradon Railway Company to raise a further Sum of Money.
- Citation: 10 & 11 Vict. c. lxii

Dates
- Royal assent: 25 June 1847

Text of statute as originally enacted

The construction had cost £27,000; about £11,000 of that was beyond the sum authorised by Parliament; by the Liskeard and Caradon Railway Amendment Act 1847 (10 & 11 Vict. c. lxii) of 25 June 1847 further capital of £10,500 and loans of £3,500 were authorised.

== Early years ==
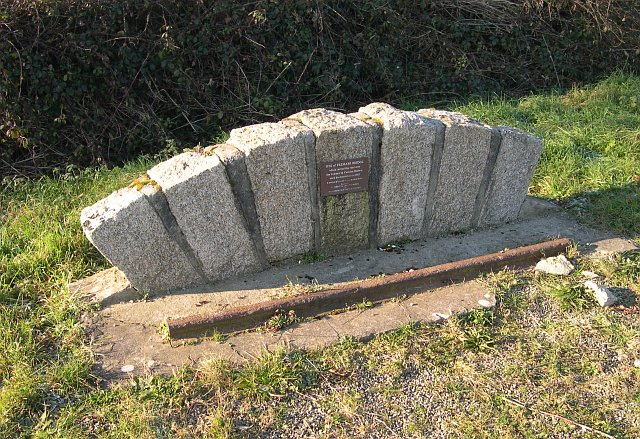
Railway memorial.

The new railway was operated by gravity and horse traction; Murray's handbook said in 1856:

Towards evening the produce of the mines and quarries is brought down to Moorswater in detached trucks, which follow one another in succession, under the control of breaksmen, and are drawn back the next day by horses.

Because of this tidal flow arrangement, frequent passing loops were not necessary. Contrary to what was originally contemplated the company was its own carrier, with the possible exception of the granite traffic from Cheesewring.

The track was T-section rail in chairs fixed to stone blocks. It was laid to 1,435 mm (4 ft 8 1/2 in) standard gauge. Speed was limited to 12 mph (19 km/h), half that over level crossings. It was graded at about 1 in 60 (1.7%) for most of its length.

The company was immediately successful, with considerable and increasing tonnages conveyed: 10,000 tons were carried in 1849, and net profit was £364. About 70% of the carrying was metal ore downwards, with nearly 30% being coal uphill to fuel the mine engines; the remainder was granite – although this did not realise the volumes originally contemplated – timber, sand, lime, iron and sundries.

The route of the railway was from close to the dressing floors of the South Caradon Mine, south and then westwards on the slope of the valley below Darite, crossing under the road at Polwrath Bridge, and then south-west, turning back eastwards across the northern margin of St Cleer where there was a goods depot. Passing south of Venland Cross, the course then turned west again to Tremabe. It was here that the line terminated in 1844; it is likely that there was no depot here, but simply that the individual wagons were stopped alongside the road and the ores trans-shipped there.

At the same time, a branch from near the Cheesewring Quarry – the owner, John Trethewey had internal sidings – ran broadly south, crossing through what became Minions village, and then descending by the incline at Gonamena, passing South Caradon further up the hillside, and running parallel to the main line, descending and joining it at Polwrath Bridge.

When the line was extended in 1846 from Tremabe to Moorswater, it ran west at first, soon turning back on a curve of 3 chains radius (66 yards, 60 m) at Old Treworgy, then turning south and then west, finally descending with the East Looe River all the way to Moorswater, where there were sidings adjacent to the canal basin.

== Passengers ==
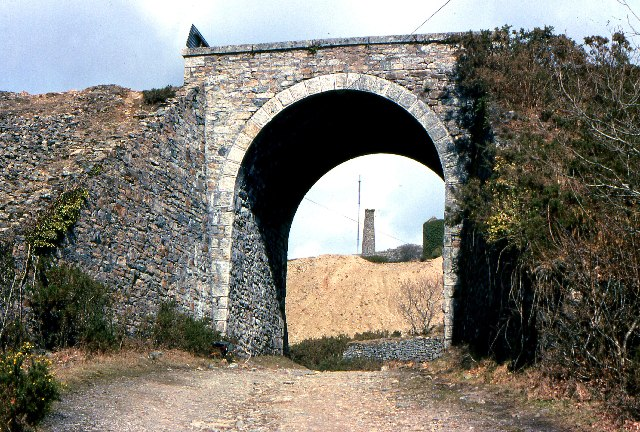
Disused Liskeard and Caradon Railway bridge, Darite.

The L&CR was conceived as a mineral railway, and the carriage of passengers was not contemplated or authorised. However the rock formation at the Cheesewring was a considerable local attraction, and organised excursions to it were undertaken; the West Briton reported a temperance excursion to the spot in June 1850. The excursions appear to have been hauled uphill by horse traction and returned by gravity.

Individual businessmen appear to have been granted passes on a casual basis; the company did not have passenger coaches, so any passengers had to travel in wagons, such conveyance being at their own risk. The L&CR had no powers to carry passengers but did carry them, in open wagons, by using a legal loophole. The passengers travelled free, but a charge was made for the carriage of their hats, coats and parcels, "a system not abandoned until 31 December 1916". This form of casual passenger carriage had also been taking place on the Liskeard and Looe Union Canal's railway.

== More traffic and more mines ==
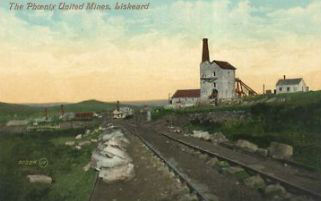
View of Phoenix Mine and track of L&CR

The success of the South Caradon mine encouraged a frenzy of speculative prospecting in the area; and the availability of transport to market further encouraged this. While much of the exploration turned out to be fruitless, there were many good finds as well. West Caradon Mine was soon productive, on the hill opposite South Caradon. The mine owners constructed a tramway on an inclined plane to reach down to the L&CR Cheesewring branch opposite Crow's Nest, probably by 1849. It was standard gauge on a gradient of 1 in 6, and it was 480 feet (146 m) long.

From 1852 ore was discovered at the Phoenix Mine and it became productive by 1854; the mine was a little to the east of Cheesewring Quarry. L&CR plans in 1854 to build a branch of the L&CR did not mature, and the mine owners built a narrow gauge tramway westward from their mine to the L&CR Cheesewring branch just north of Minions. Messenger says (on page 118) that this was "about 1850".

In 1858 traffic carried reached 28,650 tons (copper ore: 16,000 tons; coal: 5,600 tons; granite: 6,572 tons) all of which was carried on the canal also. Net profit was £2,317.

Quarrying on Kilmar Tor received a boost from 1856 when a lease was taken from the Duchy of Cornwall for the purpose. The Cheesewring Granite Company Limited (Note: Bradshaw's Railway Manual, 1867, describes it as a Limited Company.) started to exploit the abundant "loose, tumbled granite, easily quarried moorstone". Road access was impossible, and the granite company arranged to build a railway to it, and agreed with the L&CR that the railway company would operate it; this may have included maintenance. The line was opened on 26 August 1858. It diverged from the Cheesewring line in Minions village, running broadly north a little lower down the hill, and at first about level; it passed east of Cheesewring Quarry. Messenger says that "It must be presumed that it crossed the Phoenix Mine tramway on the level". 10,000 tons of granite were brought down it in 1859.

In the closing years of the 1850s, the production of South Caradon continued to increase, but West Caradon declined somewhat, and it became clear that the emphasis was moving eastwards, with East Caradon, Glasgow Caradon Consols, and mines in the area of Tokenbury Corner and the Marke Valley starting to become productive. Minerals from these mines were being brought to the surface some distance from the railway. At the same time, the process of transshipping to the canal at Moorswater, and the carrying capacity of the canal itself, were proving serious limitations.

In 1859 there were two platelayers and 27 brakesmen.

== Extensions and locomotives ==
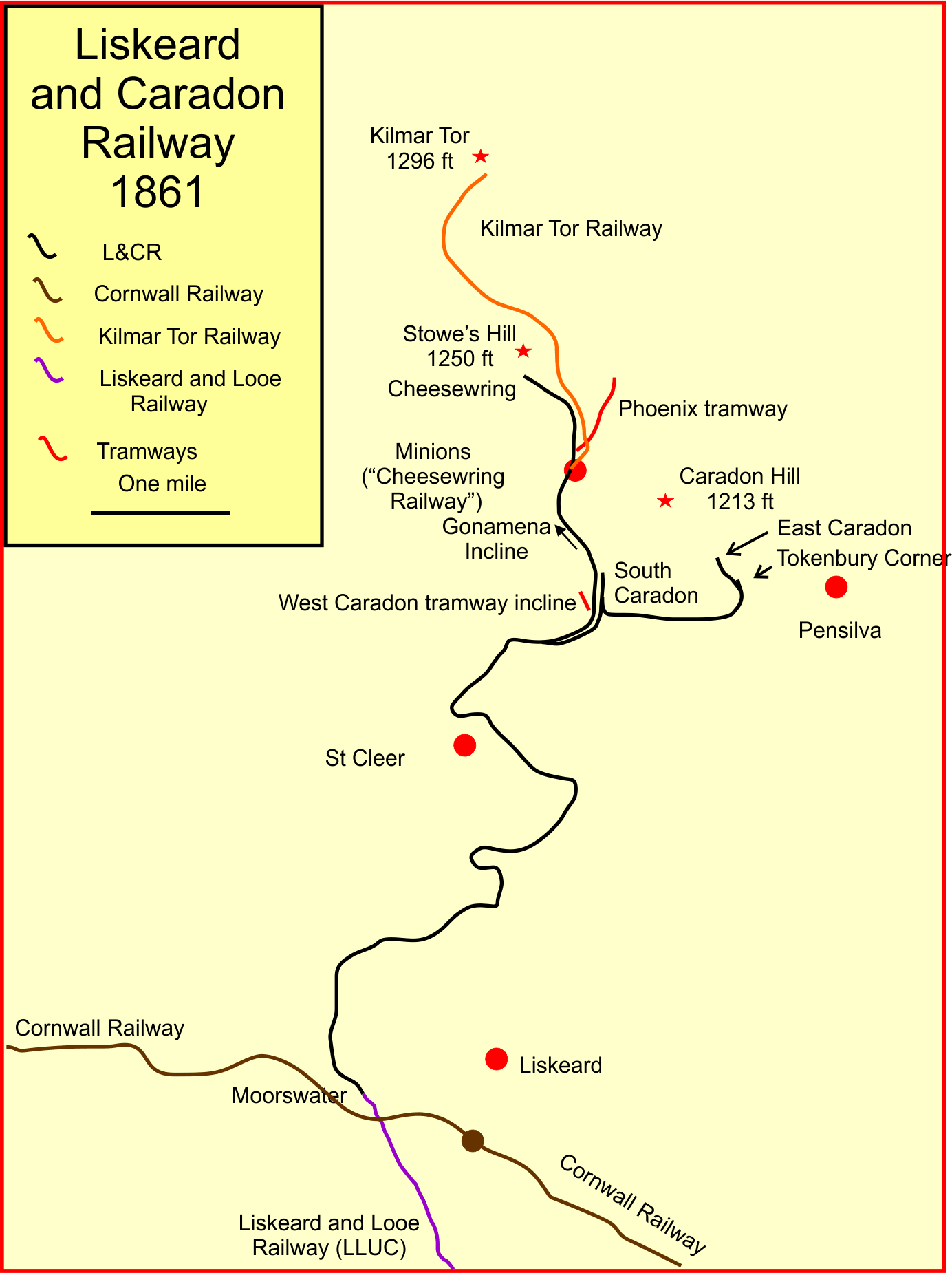
The L&CR system in 1861

The Liskeard and Looe Union Canal Company responded to the volumes of traffic by building a railway closely paralleling the canal itself, and extending to the quays at Looe; their railway opened to mineral traffic on 27 December 1860, forming a direct connection with the L&CR at Moorswater. For the time being the railway, usually referred to as the Liskeard and Looe Railway, was wholly owned by the canal company. They hired a locomotive, Liskeard but they used L&CR wagons. At last the transshipment at Moorswater was eliminated.

Liskeard and Caradon Railway Act 1860
- Act of Parliament
- Parliament of the United Kingdom
- Long title: An Act for consolidating and amending the Acts relating to the Liskeard and Caradon Railway Company, for authorizing the Alteration of Portions of their existing Railway, and the Construction of new Works; and for other Purposes.
- Citation: 23 & 24 Vict. c. xx

Dates
- Royal assent: 15 May 1860

Text of statute as originally enacted

The L&CR had applied its attention to the need for connecting the new mines, and obtained the Liskeard and Caradon Railway Act 1860 (23 & 24 Vict. c. xx) on 15 May 1860, authorising additional share capital of £12,000; the stated purposes were the construction of a Tokenbury branch, the building of a new line by-passing the Gonamena inclined plane, the acquisition of the Kilmar railway, and several local improvements to the existing lines. The L&CR evidently saw their sphere of influence as extending from Caradon to the sea at Looe, for the act also authorised the L&CR "to arrange with the Commissioners of Looe Harbour, with respect to laying down of rails at, and the use of, the works of the Commissioners." Not all of these powers were exercised.

Work quickly started on the branch to Tokenbury; this ran south and east from the South Caradon terminal, over a high embankment near there; it was opened by May 1861 at the latest, and an extension at Tokenbury to the East Caradon dressing floor nearby was opened too. The earthworks for the line to by-pass Gonamena were started, to the west of the Gonamena line near Ponton's Piece, (Note: Messenger refers to this location as Pontius Piece) and abutments for a bridge were constructed, but this deviation was never completed. (The embankment is shown on modern 1:25,000 Ordnance Survey maps.)

The L&CR observed that the locomotive Liskeard was operating successfully on the Looe line, (Note: It is not clear whether the locomotive was confined to the Looe line alone in this period, or whether the Liskeard and Looe Union Canal (LLUC) had used it on the L&CR track) and the L&CR ordered a locomotive of their own from Gilkes, Wilson and Company; it was delivered in about August 1862: it was an 0-6-0ST, named Caradon. On the original main line, many of the road crossings were level crossings and the authorising act had forbidden locomotives from crossing the turnpike roads: a £50 penalty was specified. It appears that the company may have violated the law for a period; most of the level crossings were replaced by bridge crossings in due course. In 1864 a third engine, Cheesewring, was acquired. Locomotive maintenance was carried out at a shed at Moorswater.

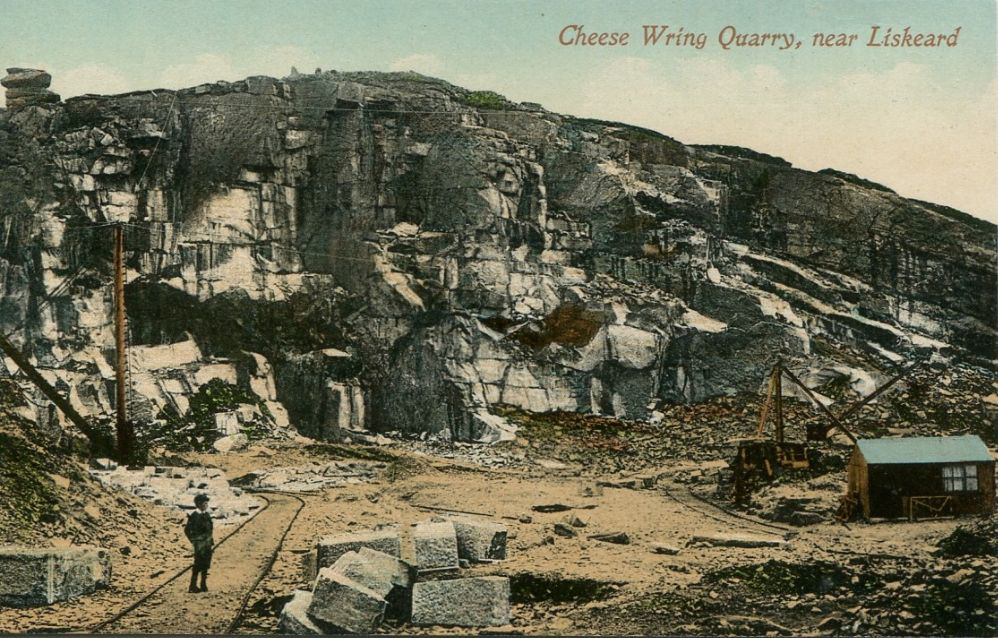
View of Cheesewring Quarry on Caradon from an old postcard

The reality now was that the overwhelmingly dominant traffic was throughout between mines and quarries on Caradon and the harbour at Looe, and in March 1862 a joint committee was formed between the L&CR (three members) and the LLUC (two members); it was agreed that the L&CR would work all the rail-borne traffic, purchasing the LLUC's locomotive Liskeard for £600, (Note: The LLUC had purchased Liskeard from its owner for £600 in September 1861) and setting tolls for carriage throughout between the mines and quarries and Looe Harbour.

Copper ore carried on the railways reached 27,000 tons in 1863, but this proved to be a peak and gentle decline followed. Coal carryings peaked at 22,000 tons as the mines went deeper and pumping became dominant.

Bodman (page 87) says that: "A narrow gauge tramway on an inclined plane was constructed to link Phoenix United with West Phoenix mine some time after 1870. It burrowed under the Kilmar Railway and near its summit ran in cutting, terminating near Stowe's Shaft. The plane was probably self-acting, taking ore down to Phoenix United for processing. Its total length was 1,230 feet (375 m)." The reference to West Phoenix is ambiguous, but here it means Stowe's Shaft near Cheesewring. Gamble defines it as "Stowe's section, also referred to as West Phoenix Shaft. West Phoenix Mine proper was further west again (south of Witheybrook Marsh)".

== Against the tide, from 1865 ==
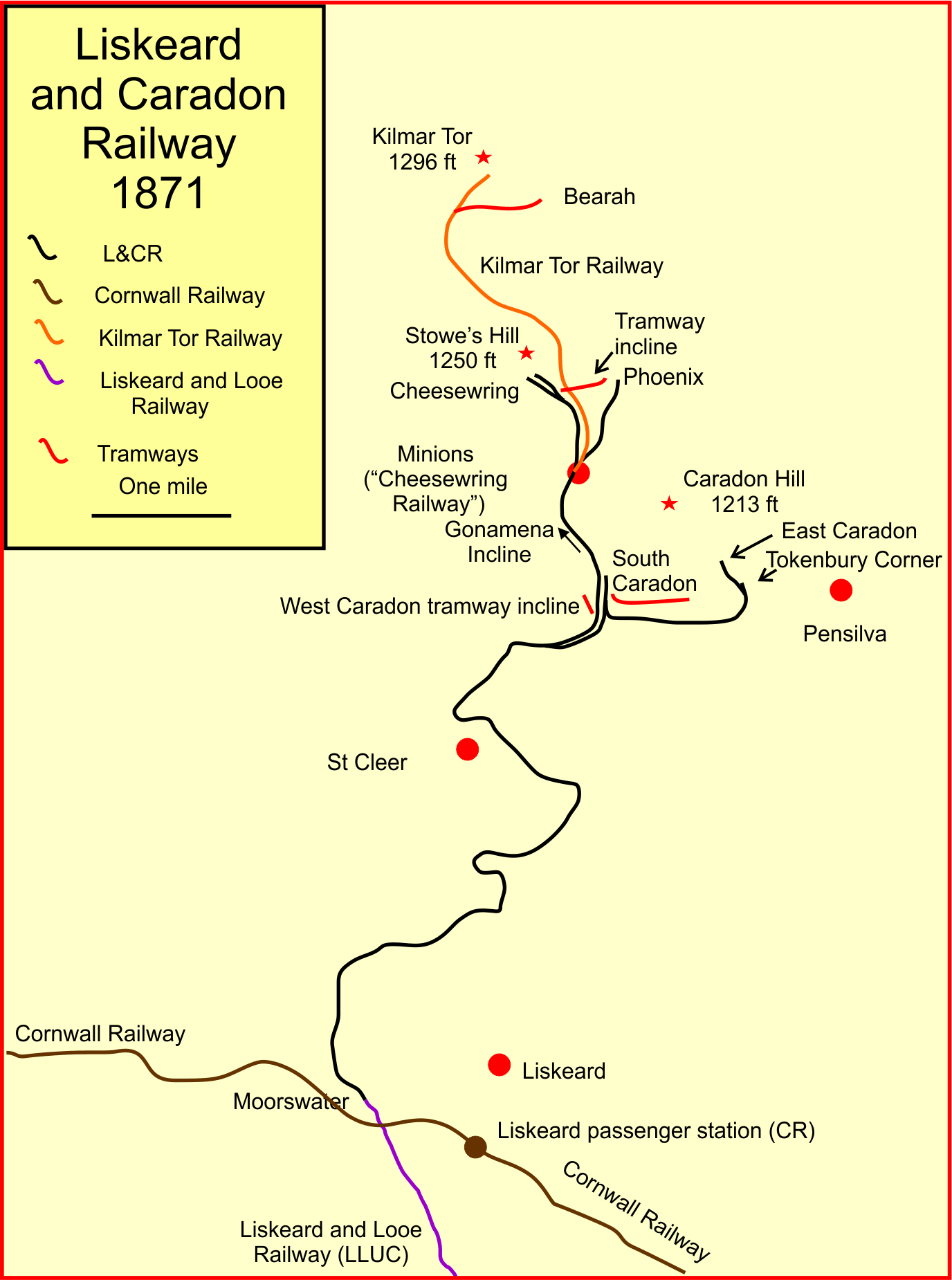
The L&CR system in 1871

In the second half of the 1860s the company started systematically upgrading the track, beginning the task of replacing the stone block sleepers with timber, and making a start on replacing level crossings with bridges (starting with Woodhill) and a third new locomotive, to be called Kilmar, was acquired in 1869.

In 1868 the Kilmar branch (still in independent ownership) was extended with a tramway to Bearah.

In 1869 a branch line was built from Minions to Phoenix Mine. This replaced, and partly followed the alignment of, an earlier tramway. In 1871 a new line into Cheesewring Quarry at a lower level was constructed.

In this period the world prices of the minerals were reducing, and this affected the profitability of the mines considerably; this impacted also the level of tolls the company could demand, and therefore its own financial status. The improvements undertaken cost heavily, and the finances of the company were under considerable strain. Operating expenses had increased more than fivefold while income had nearly tripled. Moreover, the focus of mineral extraction was moving east and north, away from the railway, compelling it to build extensions to retain the business.

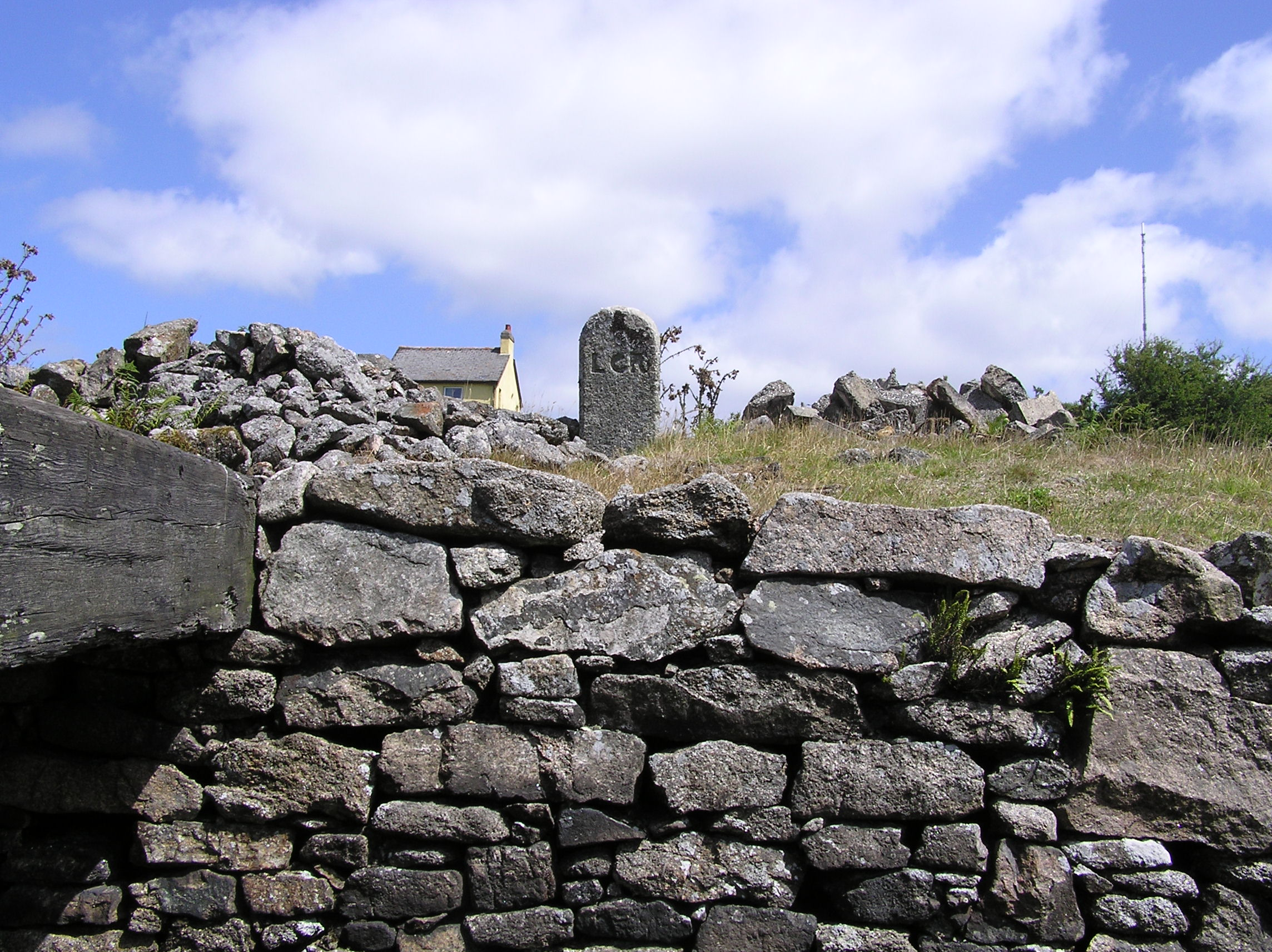
L&CR boundary post near Gonamena

The branch to Marke Valley, and a further extension around Caradon Hill, called the Kilmar Junction Railway, opened in August and November 1877. The Kilmar Junction line, although a circuitous route, connected the locations from Minions northwards without the use of the Gonamena Incline, which was closed immediately.

The North Kilmar branch (from the Kilmar line) was opened in 1879, evidently using stone block sleepers from the Gonamena incline. The Kilmar line was not the property of the L&CR, but was worked by it, and this probably included any maintenance, as well as this extension work. Entirely remote from roads and habitation, it was apparently built without any sanction by Parliament.

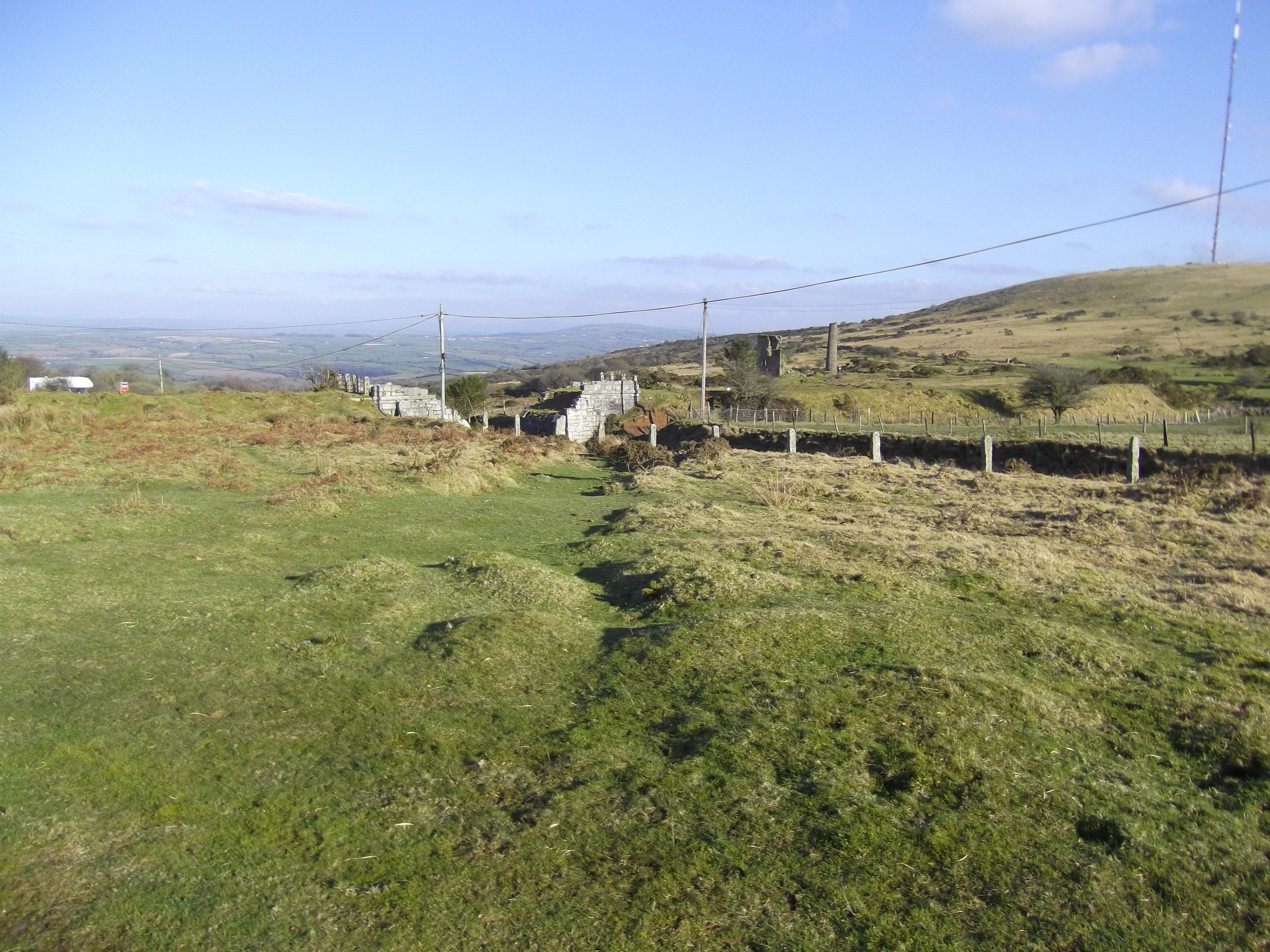
Ruined bridge for the Tokenbury line at Minions; the line passed round the left of Caradon Hill (right)

In 1877 the company was taking stock of its situation, and it decided to regularise its relationship with the LLUC's railway; it had been working that line without a formal contractual arrangement. It developed proposals to lease the line, and prepared a bill in Parliament to confirm the lease, and also to construct a connection to the line of the Cornwall Railway; that company had opened a line between Plymouth and Truro in 1859, passing Liskeard broadly east-west at a high level, and crossing the LLUC line by a viaduct.

This would have strained the financial resources of the L&CR and the bill was in fact allowed to lapse. A formal agreement was made on 29 January 1878 to lease the entire LLUC undertaking; (Note: The railway and the canal; the 1877 proposal may only have included the LLUC's railway) this was effective from 27 February 1878.

There had long been pressure for the provision of a formal passenger service on the Looe line, and this started between Looe and Moorswater on 11 September 1879, worked by the L&CR. That line was being managed by the L&CR, and the considerable upgrading works required to obtain Board of Trade approval for passenger operation were carried out by the L&CR. The process is more fully described at the Liskeard and Looe Railway article. At this time the L&CR made informal enquiries about authorising passenger traffic on its own lines, and a response from Colonel Rich (of the Railway Inspectorate, visiting to approve the Looe line's passenger facilities) was not discouraging. However the proposal seems to have been dropped, probably from simple financial considerations.

In June 1880 the company approached the Cornwall Railway for help in subsidising a road coach between their Liskeard station and Moorswater to facilitate passenger transfer, but this was refused by the CR.

== A struggle for new income – and survival – from 1882 ==
Liskeard and Caradon Railway Act 1882
- Act of Parliament
- Parliament of the United Kingdom
- Long title: An Act to authorise the Liskeard and Caradon Railway Company to make certain Railways and Works for the improvement and extension of their existing Railway and for other purposes.
- Citation: 45 & 46 Vict. c. cxi

Dates
- Royal assent: 12 July 1882

Text of statute as originally enacted

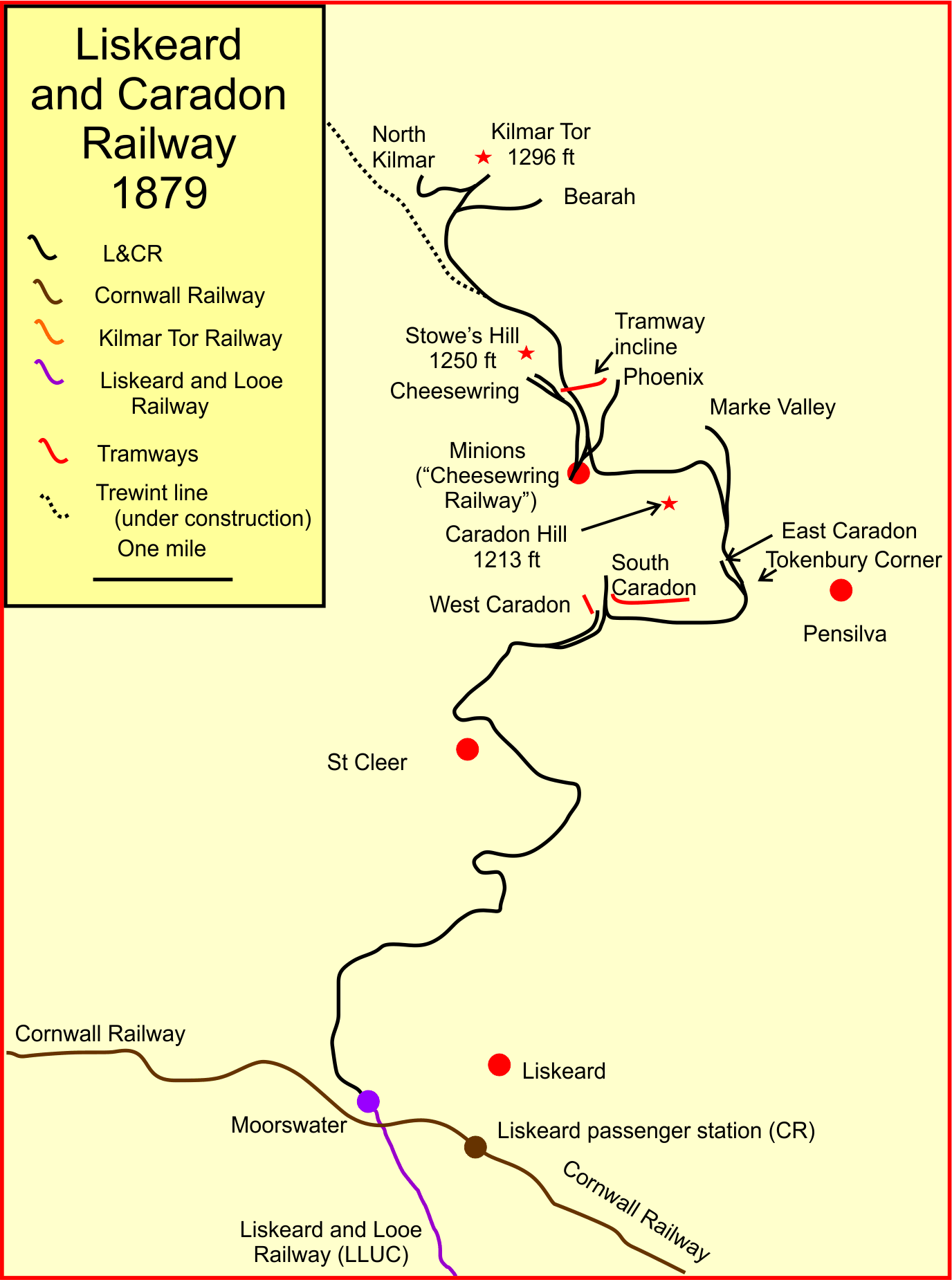
L&CR system in 1879

The Liskeard and Caradon Railway Bill passed its third reading in the House of Commons on 26 June 1882 and received the Prince of Wales' (as Duke of Cornwall) consent for seven more branches, totalling 12 miles. Two of these had already been built: a railway at the Phoenix Mine and the Kilmar Junction Railway; as they crossed moorland it is likely that the formality had not previously been thought necessary. It became the Liskeard and Caradon Railway Act 1882 (45 & 46 Vict. c. cxi).

An extension of over five miles to Trewint, near Altarnun, was planned, possibly to be extended to Camelford or Launceston, as a reaction to feared incursion into the area by other railways, and to open up mineral extraction in the area. The line was to cost £15,000 and the hoped-for subscription to fund the capital expenditure was not forthcoming. The L&CR plainly did not have the financial resources to construct such a line, and only a couple of miles of earthworks were constructed before being abandoned. The earthworks are clearly shown, labelled "Dismtd Rly" near Smallacombe on the 1:25,000 Ordnance Survey map.

Other lines authorised by the act included a connection from Moorswater to Liskeard; this too was not built, and the only new line authorised and actually built was a 400-yard connection at Rillaton (just north of Minions), providing a proper connection between the Kilmar Junction line and the Cheesewring line. Prior to this, and since the closure of the Gonamena incline, trains from Cheesewring Quarry to Moorswater had to reverse in Minions village and again on the Phoenix line. The reversal at Minions blocked the main street and had led to complaints.

Liskeard and Caradon Railway Act 1884
- Act of Parliament
- Parliament of the United Kingdom
- Long title: An Act for authorising the Liskeard and Caradon Railway Company to extend their Railway to Launceston and for authorising arrangements between them and the Liskeard and Looe Union Canal Company and for other purposes.
- Citation: 47 & 48 Vict. c. cxcv

Dates
- Royal assent: 28 July 1884

Text of statute as originally enacted

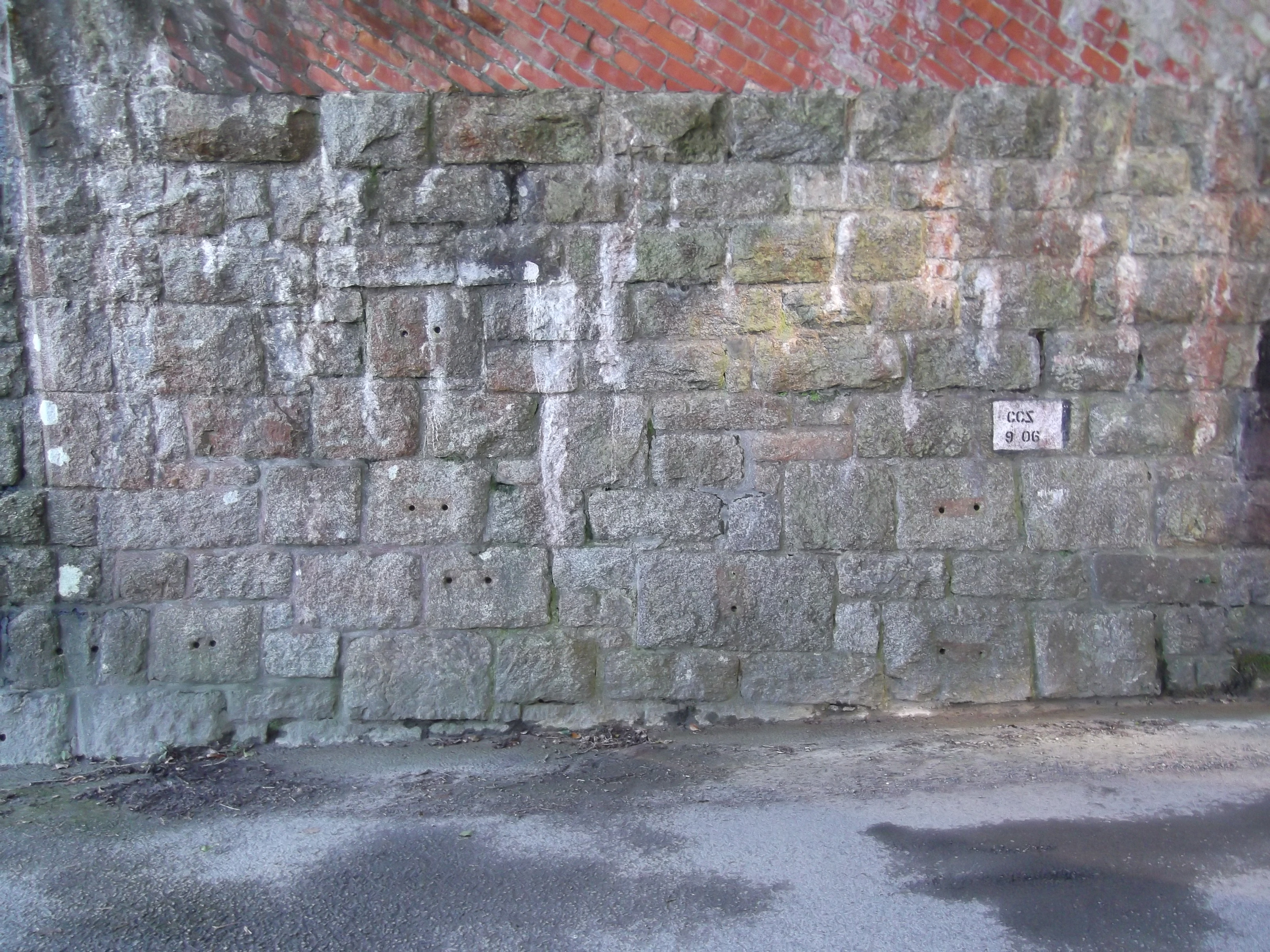
Sleeper blocks incorporated into the east abutment of Woodhill Bridge; originally there was a level crossing, and the bridge replaced it in 1884; the blocks were available as a result of conversion of some of the track to cross-sleepers

Even as the L&CR's financial position declined steeply, the idea of reaching the Launceston area continued to be developed as a solution (by bringing in new income to replace the declining mineral business) and a new act of Parliament, the Liskeard and Caradon Railway Act 1884 (47 & 48 Vict. c. cxcv), was obtained on 28 July 1884 to extend the unbuilt Trewint line by another 9½ miles. The act also authorised a new lease of the LLUC's railway for 30 years. Passenger traffic, as a source of income, was once again proposed, and Col. Rich of the Railway Inspectorate was asked to assess the line as a light railway. His report was very critical, due to the very sharp curves, worn out track, lack of signals and lack of gates and supervision at level crossings. Alarmingly the Board of Trade examined his report and drew the L&CR's attention to the prohibition on crossing public roads with steam locomotives under the original 1843 act, "and that penalties were being incurred daily". The company replied that three of seven level crossings had been replaced with bridges since 1860, and they gave instructions for the remainder to be dealt with. However Rich suggested that passengers could be carried "gratuitously" and this practice seems to have been adopted. Passengers were carried free, but they had first to purchase a ticket to Looe! A first class ticket cost 2s 6d and entitled the holder to ride in the van; third class was 1s 4d and the holder rode in open wagons. A 1910 periodical reported that at about this time travellers could be issued with a free pass if they paid for the carriage of an umbrella or hat.

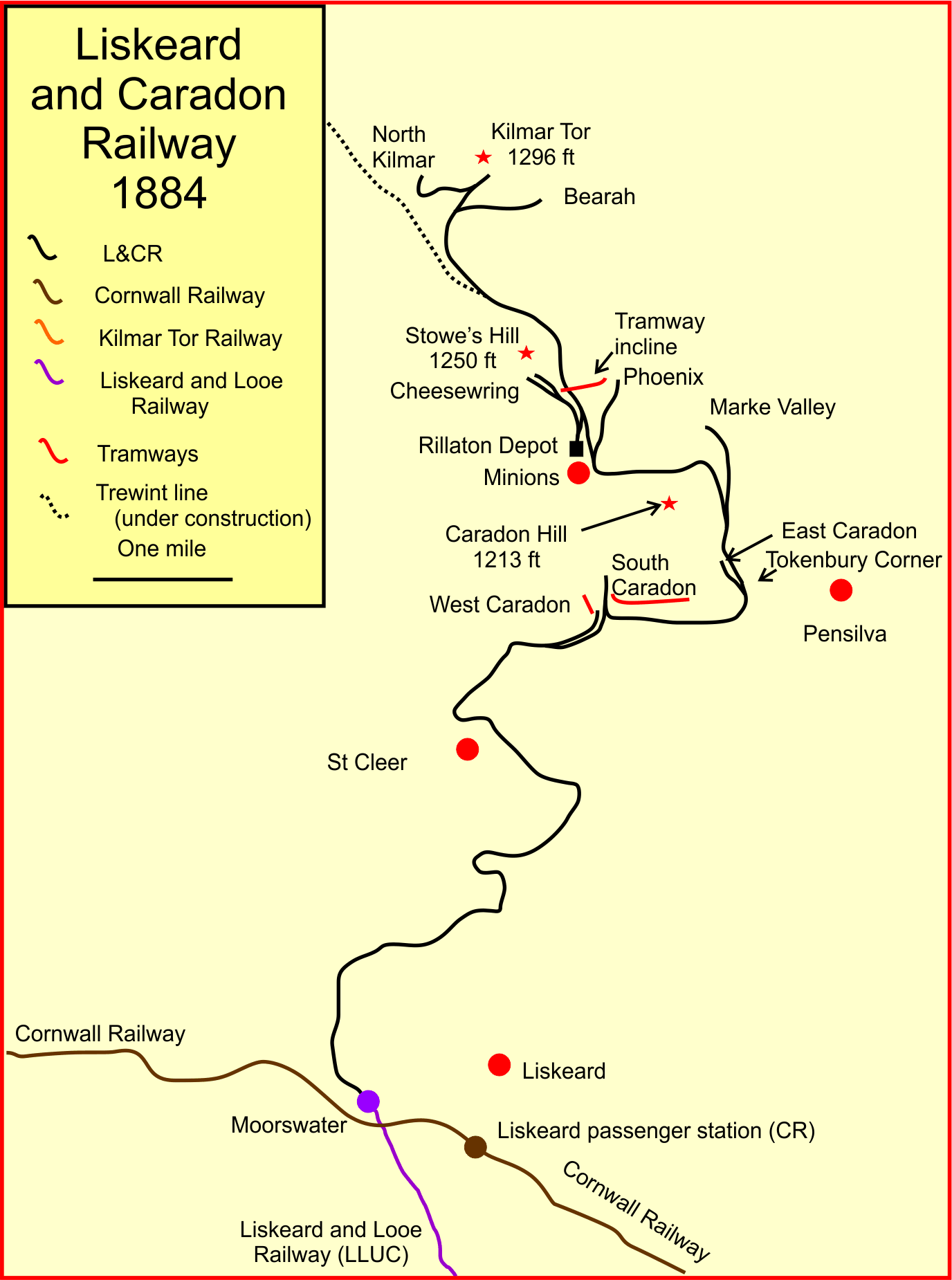
L&CR system in 1884

School parties were frequently carried however; occasionally these amounted to forty wagons hauled by two or three locomotives; when the destination was on the moor, "even these lengthy trains returned by gravity with the locomotives following".

The income from these carryings was wiped out when in 1885 the South Caradon mine ceased operation, followed quickly by the other Caradon Hill workings; the L&CR was letting contracts for the Trewint extension and at the same time finding itself unable to repay borrowings as they came due. The crisis had no solution, and on 13 October 1886 the Liskeard and Caradon Railway went into receivership. The company continued to trade, and it was making a modest, but declining, operating profit. From 1886 however there were insufficient funds to pay the LLUC lease charge, and that company too then found itself in difficulty. Drastic operating economies were put in place.

Liskeard and Caradon Railway Act 1887
- Act of Parliament
- Parliament of the United Kingdom
- Long title: An Act for conferring further powers on the Liskeard and Caradon Railway Company in relation to their undertaking and for authorising arrangements between them and other railway companies and for other purposes.
- Citation: 50 & 51 Vict. c. cxxvi

Dates
- Royal assent: 19 July 1887

Text of statute as originally enacted

Liskeard and Caradon Railway Act 1892
- Act of Parliament
- Parliament of the United Kingdom
- Long title: An Act for conferring further powers on the Liskeard and Caradon Railway Company for the completion of the Railway authorised by the Liskeard and Caradon Railway Act 1884 and for constituting that Railway a separate undertaking and for other purposes.
- Citation: 55 & 56 Vict. c. cliii

Dates
- Royal assent: 27 June 1892

In November 1885 the locomotive Kilmar had broken down, leaving only Cheesewring serviceable. An 0-6-0T hired from Peckett's of Bristol had already been returned to the owners. Money was somehow found for a new boiler for Kilmar and, astonishingly, money was found for the Liskeard and Caradon Railway Act 1887 (50 & 51 Vict. c. cxxvi), which extended the time allowed for construction of the Trewint extension. In 1892 a further act of Parliament, the Liskeard and Caradon Railway Act 1892 (55 & 56 Vict. c. cliii), was obtained allowing extra time for the line beyond Trewint to Launceston, and to constitute that as a separate concern, the Launceston Railway.

In 1890 the Board of Trade ordered that the block system (Note: The block system is a train control procedure in which a railway line is considered to be divided into sections, and no train may enter a section unless it can be verified that no other train is in the section. See Signalling block system.) and continuous brakes (Note: Continuous brakes are brakes that can be controlled throughout the train by the driver, and if they are automatic brakes then they are automatically applied in both portions if the train becomes accidentally divided. See Railway brake.) be instituted on the lines (L&CR and the LLUC line, for which the L&CR had responsibility). This was another unwanted expense, and the company tried to negotiate an exemption; but eventually vacuum brakes were fitted, and the One engine in steam operating system was instituted, achieving the object of the block system.

== The Looe line reaches Liskeard ==
With the L&CR in receivership and defaulting on payments due to the LLUC, the latter looked gloomily at the declining fortunes of mineral extraction on Caradon, and the idea of an extension to the Cornwall Railway's main line at Liskeard was raised again. (The Great Western Railway absorbed the Cornwall Railway in 1895; their broad gauge line had been converted to standard gauge in 1892.) A number of schemes were considered over a decade or so, culminating in the Liskeard and Looe Railway Extension Act 1895 (58 & 59 Vict. c. cviii). This authorised a connecting line from Coombe to Liskeard, on a very steep gradient and forming almost a complete circle to gain height. The LLUC company name was finally changed to the Liskeard and Looe Railway (L&LR); new capital was authorised, but was very hard to find, until a Captain John Spicer, not a local man, offered to subscribe a large sum in purchasing both preference and ordinary shares. After some delay this was done, and Spicer acquired a controlling interest in the L&LR. The company could now proceed to build the connecting line, and work started in 1898. It opened on 8 May 1901. The L&LR had given the receiver of the L&CR notice that it would work its line itself, and that it would take over the operation of the L&CR in accordance with the terms of the earlier lease. The two lines were now operated under common management.

Nonetheless the L&CR receiver claimed for the value of the L&CR's equipment taken over, and after protracted legal processes, the L&LR were compelled to pay £3,850 to the L&CR receiver; the money was distributed among that Company's shareholders.

The L&LR passenger operation grew enormously, but despite some small new traffics, the L&CR continued to decline. The weak and worn out track was also expensive to keep in repair: maintenance costs per train mile were three times the English average.

The cost of construction of the Liskeard extension had overrun very considerably, and Spicer footed the escalating bill. Despite the relative profitability of the L&LR it was unable to pay interest charges consistently, and paradoxically it now failed to pay the L&CR lease charge, and the L&CR receiver took action against the L&LR. Hopelessly unable to pay off its huge debts, the company looked for a purchaser in the Great Western Railway (GWR). The GWR was anxious to keep the rival London and South Western Railway out of the area, and agreed to purchase the L&CR.

== Owned by the Great Western Railway ==
The purchase took effect from 1 July 1909, the GWR having taken over maintenance from 1 January. They also agreed to work the L&LR from 1 January 1909. The Great Western Railway, Liskeard and Looe, and Liskeard and Caradon Railways Act 1909 (9 Edw. 7. c. xiii) was passed on 25 May 1909, confirming the changes. A liquidator was appointed; and Captain Spicer lost a considerable amount of money.

The GWR soon had a thorough technical assessment of the L&CR line done, and for a short time passenger trains, or even revival of the extension to Launceston, were under consideration. However the very poor state of the track soon put paid to these ideas, and the GWR turned to consideration of road motor service to the area.

There were sporadic signs of a resurgence of mineral extraction in the L&CR area, but the commercial possibilities were limited, and the outbreak of the First World War in July 1914 finished off the projects. The GWR announced a temporary closure of the L&CR lines "to assist the war effort" on 1 January 1917, and the rails were taken up. The GWR continued to pay the wayleave rental to the Duchy of Cornwall for the Phoenix and Cornwall lines until 1933, but legal abandonment of the L&CR lines took place in 1931.

== Locomotives ==
Ownership of locomotives as between the LLUC and L&CR, and whether they worked on both railways, is sometimes uncertain.

- Liskeard was a 0-4-0ST locomotive, probably made by the Bury locomotive company, possibly originally a tender locomotive. She was hired from James Murphy of Newport, South Wales, in 1860 and later purchased. She was sold back to James Murphy in 1866.
- Caradon was a 0-6-0ST supplied new to the railway in 1862 by Gilkes Wilson and Company, works number 138. She had outside cylinders 13in x 24in and 4 ft 0in driving wheels. The boiler was of the conventional type with the firebox located between the second and third axles. She was scrapped about 1907.
- Cheesewring was another 0-6-0ST supplied new in 1865, (Mitchell and Smith say "constructed in 1864 for the LCR") also by Gilkes Wilson and Company, works number 195. Again, she had outside cylinders 13in x 24in and 4 ft 0in driving wheels but she differed from Caradon in being of the "long boiler" type with the firebox behind the third axle. She was rebuilt in Swindon in 1907 and became GWR number 1311 and was scrapped in 1919. There were no flanges on the centre wheels.
- Kilmar was another long boiler 0-6-0ST supplied new in 1869 by Hopkins Gilkes and Company (successors to Gilkes, Wilson and Co), works number 264. She was similar to Cheesewring but with a shorter tank and modified boiler fittings. Driving wheels were, again, 4 ft 0in diameter and cylinders were either 12in × 24in or 14in × 24in (sources disagree; Messenger says 13in × 24in). She was the only locomotive recorded to have been involved in an accident on the L&CR when a load of granite blocks that she was hauling managed to move the rails apart when heavy rain softened the ground sufficiently for the blocks holding the rails to move. While several wagons fell between the rails, Kilmar was unaffected, continuing her journey and returning the following day with a gang and lifting tackle. She became GWR number 1313 (Mitchell and Smith say 1312) and was scrapped in 1914.
- Looe was a 0-6-0ST supplied new in 1901 by Robert Stephenson and Company, works number 3050. She had outside cylinders 16in x 20in and driving wheels 3 ft 3in or 3 ft 6in diameter (sources disagree). She was found to be too heavy, with a high centre of gravity and a short wheelbase – damaging the track and causing derailments – so she was sold in 1902 to the London and East India Docks Railway (later the Port of London Authority), becoming PLA number 11. She was scrapped in December 1950.
- Lady Margaret was an inside-cylinder 2-4-0T supplied new in 1902 or 1904 by Andrew Barclay and Company. Dimensions were: cylinders 14½in x 22in; driving wheels 4 ft 0in; leading wheels 2 ft 7½in. She is recorded as the usual motive power for trains to Looe from 1904 and she subsequently became GWR No. 1308. She had moved to Garnant by 1922 and was scrapped about 1948, her last shed being Oswestry.
- A Peckett 0-6-0ST was hired in, during the period 1885 - 1886, works number 444; she had 14in x 20 in cylinders and 3 ft 6½in driving wheels.

After 1909, various GWR locomotives began to appear on the line, including 1901 class Saddle tanks and 2021 class 0-6-0PT. Later, 2-6-2T of classes 4400 and 4500 were also used. In addition, experimental locomotive No. 13, then a 4-4-0T and originally built by the GWR in 1886, was recorded as being allocated to Moorswater shed in 1922.

Note: not all of the above details are verifiable in available sources, but the primary outline is in Messenger.

== Mileages ==
Cooke gives milepost mileages for the line on adoption by the GWR (when the Gonamena incline had closed); from a zero at Looe the Moorswater point of junction was 7m 29c; South Caradon was 13m 66c. Tokenbury Corner (via reversal) was 14m 79c; Minions was 17m 16c; Cheesewring Quarry was 17m 67c; and Kilmar Tor was 19m 50c. (Railway distances in the UK are measured in miles and chains; there are 80 chains in a mile. One mile = 1.61 km.)

MacDermot gives the aggregate mileage at closure as 12m 45c.
