= GWR 4600 Class =

Class of 1 two-cylinder 4-4-2T locomotive

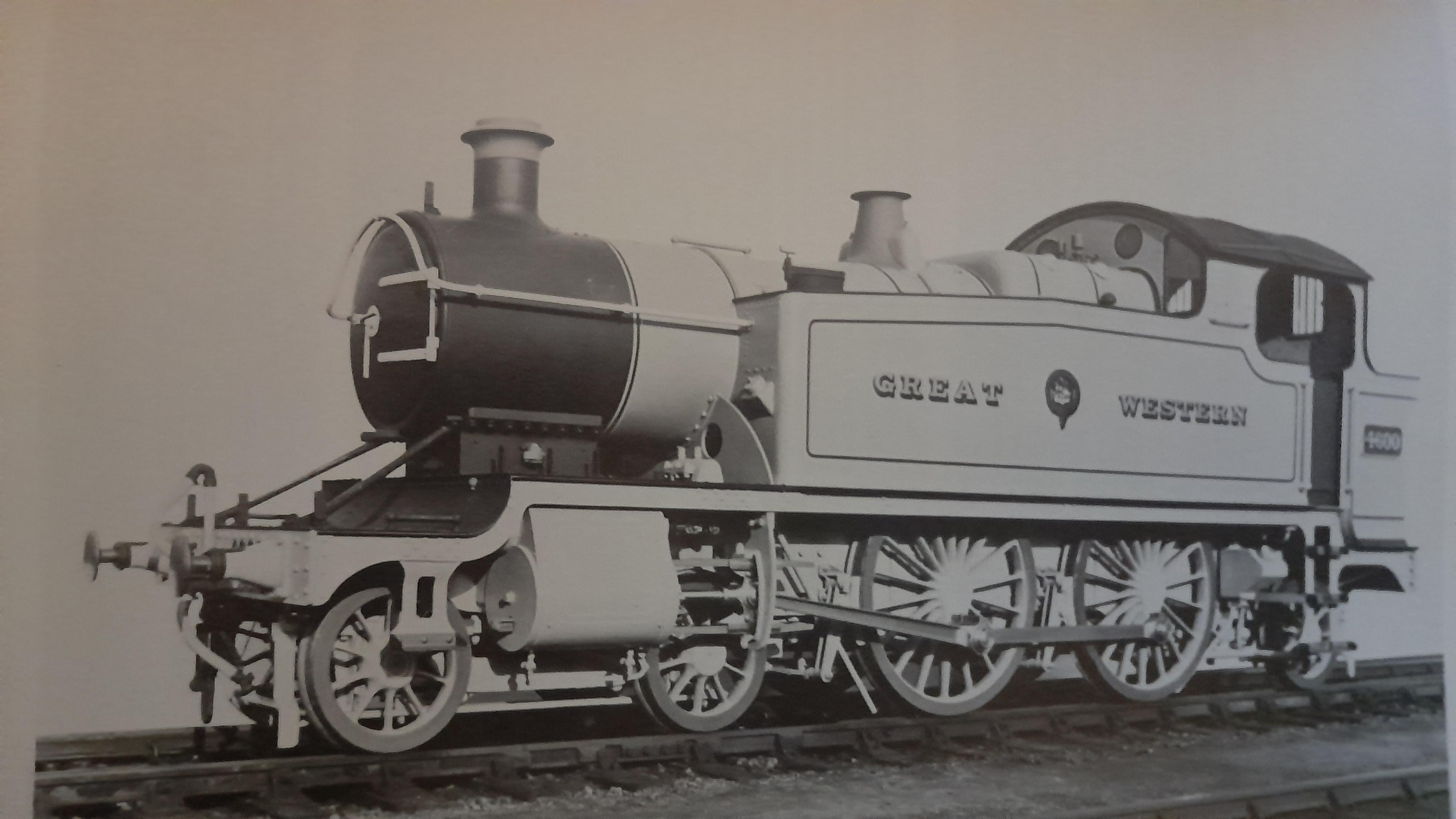
- 4600 as built in 1913
Type and origin
- Power type: Steam
- Designer: George Jackson Churchward
- Builder: GWR Swindon Works
- Order number: Lot 197
- Serial number: 2551
- Build date: 1913
- Total produced: 1
Specifications
- Configuration
  - Whyte: 4-4-2T
- Gauge: 4 ft 8 1/2 in (1,435 mm) standard gauge
- Leading dia.: 3 ft 2 in (0.965 m)
- Driver dia.: 5 ft 8 in (1.727 m)
- Trailing dia.: 3 ft 2 in (0.965 m)
- Length: 36 ft 11 3/4 in (11.271 m)
- Loco weight: 60 long tons 12 cwt (61.6 t; 67.9 short tons)
- Fuel type: Coal
- Fuel capacity: 3 long tons (3.0 t; 3.4 short tons)
- Water cap.: 1,100 imp gal (5,000 L; 1,300 US gal)
- Firebox
  - Type: Belpaire
  - Grate area: 93.85 sq ft (8.719 m^{2})
- Boiler: GWR Standard No. 5
- Boiler pressure: 200 psi (1.4 MPa)
- Cylinders: Two, outside
- Cylinder size: 17 in × 24 in (432 mm × 610 mm)
Performance figures
- Tractive effort: 18,360 lbf (81.7 kN)
Career
- Operators: Great Western Railway
- Class: 4600
- Power class: GWR: A
- Axle load class: GWR: Blue
- Withdrawn: 1925
- Disposition: Scrapped

The 4600 Class was a 4-4-2T steam locomotive built by the Great Western Railway in 1913. It was one of the GWR standard classes with two outside cylinders.

It was designed as light suburban locomotive, based on the successful 4500 class 2-6-2T engines. Compared with these, it had larger (and fewer) coupled wheels, intended to allow higher speeds with local trains. The only example built spent most of its career in the Birmingham area, and was not considered a success. The limited adhesion and restricted tank capacity meant that it did not improve on the 4500 class, and the larger 2-6-2T classes handled the suburban traffic better. It was moved to western Wales in 1918 for use on the lines to Pembroke Dock and Neyland. It was withdrawn and scrapped in 1925.
