= GWR 4400 Class =

Class of two-cylinder 2-6-2T locomotives

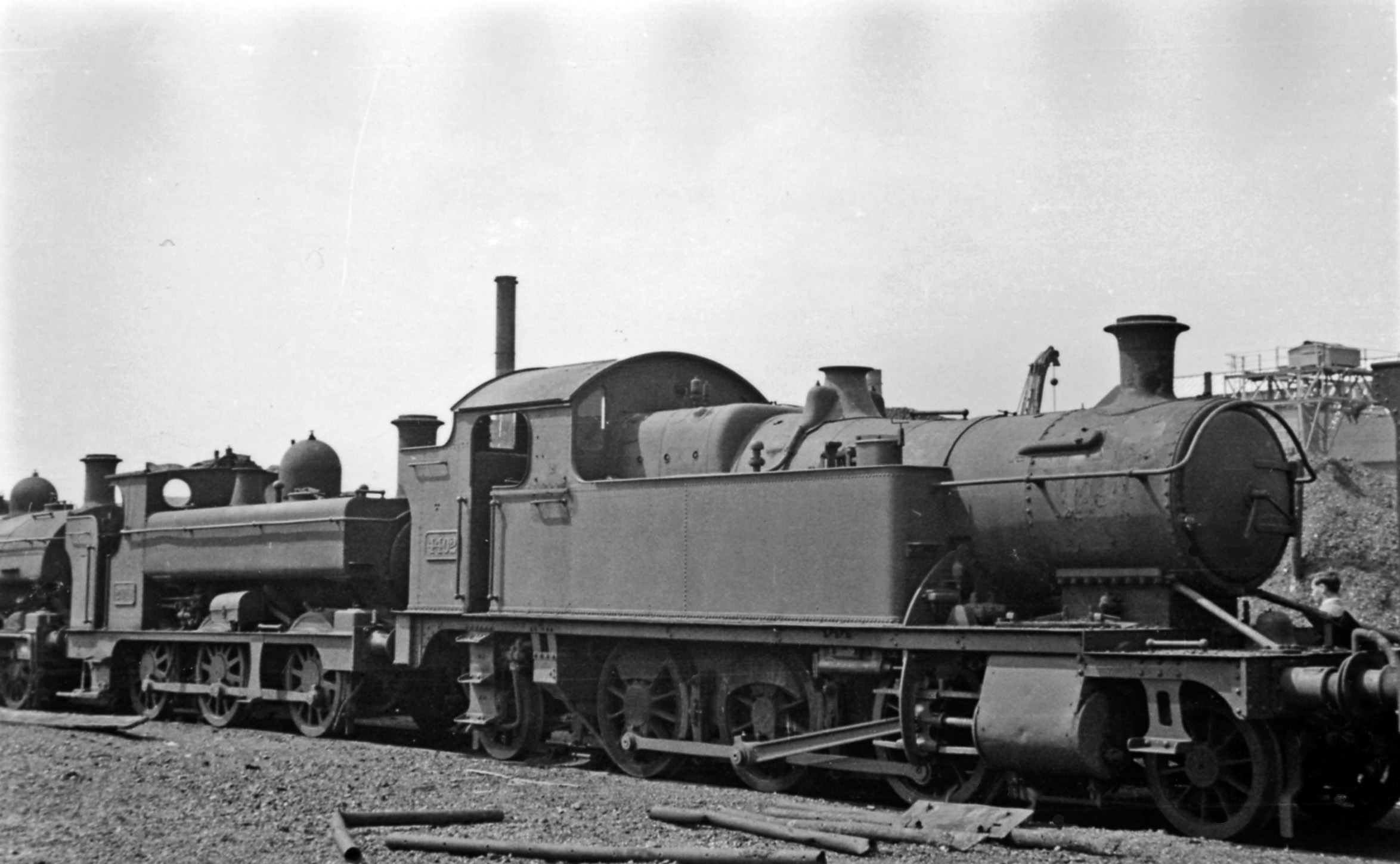
- 4402 at Swindon 1950 awaiting scrapping
Type and origin
- Power type: Steam
- Designer: George Jackson Churchward
- Builder: Wolverhampton Works (10); Swindon Works (1)
- Serial number: Wolverhampton: 765–774; Swindon: 2023
- Build date: 1905–1906, 1914
- Total produced: 11
Specifications
- Configuration
  - Whyte: 2-6-2T
- Gauge: 4 ft 8 1/2 in (1,435 mm) standard gauge
- Leading dia.: 3 ft 2 in (965 mm)
- Driver dia.: 4 ft 1 1/2 in (1,257 mm)
- Trailing dia.: 3 ft 2 in (965 mm)
- Length: 36 ft 4 1/2 in (11.087 m)
- Width: 8 ft 7 in (2.616 m)
- Height: 12 ft 5 9/16 in (3.799 m)
- Loco weight: 56 long tons 13 cwt (57.6 t) (63.4 short tons)
- Fuel type: Coal
- Fuel capacity: Originally: 2 long tons 3 cwt (4,800 lb or 2.2 t); Later: 2 long tons 17 cwt (6,400 lb or 2.9 t)
- Water cap.: 1,000 imp gal (4,500 L; 1,200 US gal)
- Boiler
  - Type: Standard 5
- Boiler pressure: 180 lbf/in^{2} (1.24 MPa)
- Cylinders: Two, outside
- Cylinder size: 17 in × 24 in (432 mm × 610 mm)
Performance figures
- Tractive effort: 21,440 lbf (95.37 kN)
Career
- Operators: Great Western Railway; British Railways
- Locale: Western Region
- Withdrawn: December 1949 – September 1955
- Disposition: All scrapped
- Sources for technical data

The Great Western Railway (GWR) 4400 Class was a class of 2-6-2T side tank steam locomotive.

== History ==
They were introduced in 1904 for work on small branch lines. The 4500 class was a later development with larger driving wheels. The 4400s were particularly used in hilly districts, notably the Princetown and Much Wenlock Branches. All were withdrawn and scrapped between 1949 and 1955.

The 4400, 4500 and 4575 classes, which all had 24 in (610 mm) stroke cylinders, the Standard 5 boiler and driving wheels under 5 ft (1.524 m), were collectively known as "Small Prairies", as opposed to the 5100, 3150, 5101, 6100, 3100 and 8100 classes, with 30 in (762 mm) stroke cylinders, Standard 2 or 4 boilers and driving wheels over 5 ft (1.524 m), known as "Large Prairies".

== See also ==
- GWR 4500 Class
- GWR 4575 Class
- List of GWR standard classes with two outside cylinders
