= List of GWR standard classes with two outside cylinders =

Comparative list of GWR standard locomotive classes

George Jackson Churchward created for the Great Western Railway a family of standard classes of locomotive, based on a limited set of shared dimensions and components, and his principles were followed by his successors. Most of these locomotives had two cylinders, placed outside the frames, and they are listed here, ranging in size from small-wheeled 2-6-2T tank locos to 2-8-0 express freight engines.

== History of standardisation ==
Standardisation on the GWR started with Daniel Gooch, its first Locomotive Superintendent (Note: Locomotive Superintendent. The office carried various names, changing to Chief Mechanical Engineer during Churchward's tenure.), who enforced uniformity on third-party suppliers of parts by issuing lithographed copies of drawings and iron templates to check accurate fitting. This was carried through once the GWR built its own works at Swindon, and standard parts were also shared by different classes of locomotive. Joseph Armstrong (and his brother George) used similar techniques at Wolverhampton, and continued Gooch's policy when he replaced him at Swindon. William Dean, Armstrong's successor, designed (among others) four classes of locomotive, 2-4-0 and 0-6-0 tender and tank engines, which shared many standard components. However, it was Churchward who carried the policy to lengths which made GWR locomotives distinctive and shaped their development until the nationalisation of the railways.

Even before Churchward succeeded Dean as Locomotive Superintendent in 1902, he had in 1901 published a list of proposed new locomotive classes of a revolutionary nature. He began by designing a range of standard components, then constructed a variety of locomotive designs of different sizes and purposes around these items. These locomotives were to have two outside cylinders, inside frames and motion, generous piston valves, and identical left/right cylinder castings, and they shared three coupled wheel sizes, two standard boilers and a single size of leading/trailing wheel. When Churchward took over the job, he began to create prototypes to test and evaluate his ideas, and they were developed into a series of locomotive classes that appeared throughout Churchward's time in office, and were further developed and expanded by both Charles Collett and Frederick Hawksworth, his successors up to the end of the GWR. Indeed, the proposed 4-6-0 with 5 ft 8 in driving wheels did not appear until Collett built the Granges in 1936. Even after the GWR ceased to exist, a new 'class' of Mogul was developed on the West Somerset Railway.

== Comparison of locomotive classes ==
This table summarises the classes that developed from Churchward's proposals. It is simplified in that it suggests the classes were sets of identical engines, whereas the prototypes often differed in some respects from later class members, and there was a constant move to improve the locomotives by changing boilers, enlarging cylinders and tweaking other details of their construction. By and large, the details and dimensions given were common to most members of the class in their final form. The details of Churchward's original proposed locomotives and boilers are shaded; no classes were built to exactly those dimensions. However, the proposed classes will sort adjacent to the most closely matching real classes. The WSR Mogul is shaded pink.

This table does not include

- the 4-cylinder classes - Stars, Castles and Kings
- similar looking inside-cylinder classes - 3901 2-6-2Ts, 5600 0-6-2Ts, and 2251 0-6-0s
- non-standard classes - outside-cylindered ex-ROD 3000 2-8-0s

GWR standard classes with two outside cylinders
Class	CME	Year	Wheel arrangement	Driving wheel spacing	Wheel diameters			Cylinders		Standard boiler no.	Boiler pressure	Tractive effort	Numbering	Refs
Class	CME	Year	Wheel arrangement	Driving wheel spacing	Leading	Driving	Trailing	Bore	Stroke	Standard boiler no.	Boiler pressure	Tractive effort	Numbering	Refs
Proposed 4-6-0	Churchward	1901	4-6-0		3 ft 3 in	6 ft 8 1/2 in		18 in	30 in	Prop 1				
Proposed 4-6-0	Churchward	1901	4-6-0		3 ft 3 in	5 ft 8 in		18 in	30 in	Prop 1				
Proposed 4-4-2T	Churchward	1901	4-4-2T		3 ft 3 in	6 ft 8 1/2 in	3 ft 3 in	18 in	30 in	Prop 2				
Proposed 4-4-0	Churchward	1901	4-4-0		3 ft 3 in	6 ft 8 1/2 in		18 in	30 in	Prop 2				
Proposed 2-8-0	Churchward	1901	2-8-0		3 ft 3 in	4 ft 7 1/2 in		18 in	30 in	Prop 1				
Proposed 2-6-2T	Churchward	1901	2-6-2T		3 ft 3 in	5 ft 8 in	3 ft 3 in	18 in	30 in	Prop 2				
2900 Saint	Churchward	1902	4-6-0 (Note: Fourteen of the class ran briefly as 4-4-2s to allow comparison with French 4-4-2 compound locomotives)	7 ft / 7 ft 9 in	3 ft 2 in	6 ft 8 1/2 in		18 1/2 in	30 in	1	225 psi	24,395 lbf	2900-2955; 2971-2990; 2998	
2800, 2884 (Note: The 2884 class (built by Collett) differed mainly in having greater weight, outside steam pipes, and better cabs, not in the principal dimensions.)	Churchward	1903	2-8-0	5 ft 5 in / 5 ft 5 in / 6 ft	3 ft 2 in	4 ft 7 1/2 in		18 1/2 in	30 in	1	225 psi	35,380 lbf	28xx, 3800-66	
3100 (1903)	Churchward	1903	2-6-2T	7 ft / 7 ft 9 in	3 ft 2 in	5 ft 8 in	3 ft 8 in	18 in	30 in	2	200 psi	24,300 lbf	3100, 3111-49; later renumbered 5100, 5111-49	
3800 County	Churchward	1904	4-4-0	8 ft 6 in	3 ft 2 in	6 ft 8 1/2 in		18 in	30 in	4	200 psi	20,530 lbf	3473-82; renumbered 3800-39	
4400	Churchward	1904	2-6-2T	6 ft / 5 ft 6 in	3 ft 2 in	4 ft 1 1/2 in	3 ft 2 in	16 1/2 in	24 in	5	180 psi	20,195 lbf	4400-10	
2221 County Tank	Churchward	1905	4-4-2T	8 ft 6 in	3 ft 2 in	6 ft 8 1/2 in	3 ft 8 in	18 in	30 in	2	200 psi	20,530 lbf	2221-50	
4500, 4575 (Note: The 4575 class (built by Collett) differed only in having increased water capacity, not in the principal dimensions.)	Churchward	1906	2-6-2T	5 ft 6 in / 6 ft	3 ft 2 in	4 ft 7 1/2 in	3 ft 2 in	17 in	24 in	5	200 psi	21,250 lbf	2161-90; later renumbered 45xx, 5500-74	
3150	Churchward	1906	2-6-2T	7 ft / 7 ft 9 in	3 ft 2 in	5 ft 8 in	3 ft 8 in	18 1/2 in	30 in	4	200 psi	25,670 lbf	3150-90	
4200	Churchward	1910	2-8-0T	7 ft / 6 ft / 7 ft	3 ft 2 in	4 ft 7 1/2 in		18 1/2 in	30 in	4	200 psi	31,450 lbf	42xx, 5200-04	
4300 Mogul	Churchward	1911	2-6-0	7 ft / 7 ft 9 in	3 ft 2 in	5 ft 8 in		18 1/2 in	30 in	4	200 psi	25,670 lbf	43xx, 53xx, 63xx, 7300-21, 9300-21	
4600	Churchward	1913	4-4-2T	7 ft	3 ft 2 in	5 ft 8 in	3 ft 2 in	17 in	24 in	5	200 psi	18,360 lbf	4600	
4700	Churchward	1919	2-8-0	6 ft 6 in / 6 ft 6 in / 7 ft	3 ft 2 in	5 ft 8 in		19 in	30 in	7	225 psi	30,460 lbf	4700-08	
5205	Collett	1923	2-8-0T	7 ft / 6 ft / 7 ft	3 ft 2 in	4 ft 7 1/2 in		19 in	30 in	4	200 psi	33,170 lbf	5205-64	
4900 Hall	Collett	1924	4-6-0	7 ft / 7 ft 9 in	3 ft	6 ft		18 1/2 in	30 in	1	225 psi	27,275 lbf	49xx, 59xx, 6900-58	
5101	Collett	1929	2-6-2T	7 ft / 7 ft 9 in	3 ft 2 in	5 ft 8 in	3 ft 8 in	18 in	30 in	2	200 psi	24,300 lbf	5101-10, 5150-99, 4100-79	
6100	Collett	1931	2-6-2T	7 ft / 7 ft 9 in	3 ft 2 in	5 ft 8 in	3 ft 8 in	18 in	30 in	2	225 psi	27,340 lbf	6100-69	
7200	Collett	1934	2-8-2T	7 ft / 6 ft / 7 ft	3 ft 2 in	4 ft 7 1/2 in	3 ft 8 in	19 in	30 in	4	200 psi	33,170 lbf	7200-53	
6800 Grange	Collett	1936	4-6-0	7 ft / 7 ft 9 in	3 ft	5 ft 8 in		18 1/2 in	30 in	1	225 psi	28,875 lbf	6800-79	
7800 Manor	Collett	1938	4-6-0	7 ft / 7 ft 9 in	3 ft	5 ft 8 in		18 in	30 in	14	225 psi	27,340 lbf	7800-19	
8100	Collett	1938	2-6-2T	7 ft / 7 ft 9 in	3 ft	5 ft 6 in	3 ft 8 in	18 in	30 in	2	225 psi	28,165 lbf	8100-09	
3100 (1938)	Collett	1938	2-6-2T	7 ft / 7 ft 9 in	3 ft	5 ft 3 in	3 ft 8 in	18 1/2 in	30 in	4	225 psi	31,170 lbf	3100-04	
6959 Modified Hall	Hawksworth	1944	4-6-0	7 ft / 7 ft 9 in	3 ft	6 ft		18 1/2 in	30 in	1	225 psi	27,275 lbf	6959-99, 7900-29	
1000 County	Hawksworth	1945	4-6-0	7 ft / 7 ft 9 in	3 ft	6 ft 3 in		18 1/2 in	30 in	15	280 psi	32,580 lbf	1000-29	
9351 WSR Mogul	WSR	2004	2-6-0	7 ft / 7 ft 9 in	3 ft 2 in	5 ft 8 in		18 in	30 in	2	200 psi	24,300 lbf	9351	

== List of boilers ==
The history of GWR boilers is long and complex. This table lists only the principal dimensions of the boilers (including proposed boilers) mentioned in the table of standard classes.

Selected GWR boilers
Boiler number	Length	Firebox length	Rear diameter	Front diameter
Prop 1	15 ft	9 ft	5 ft	
Prop 2	11 ft 2 in	8 ft 8 in	5 ft	
1	14 ft 10 in	9 ft	5 ft 6 in	4 ft 11 in
2	11 ft	7 ft	5 ft	4 ft 5 in
4	11 ft	7 ft	5 ft 6 in	4 ft 11 in
5	10 ft 6 in	5 ft 10 in	4 ft 9 in	4 ft 2 in
7	14 ft 10 in	10 ft	6 ft	5 ft 6 in
14	12 ft 6 in	8 ft 8 in	5 ft 3 in	4 ft 8 in
15	12 ft 7 in	9 ft 9 in	5 ft 8 in	5 ft
