= GWR 3901 Class =

Class of 20 two-cylinder 2-6-2T locomotives

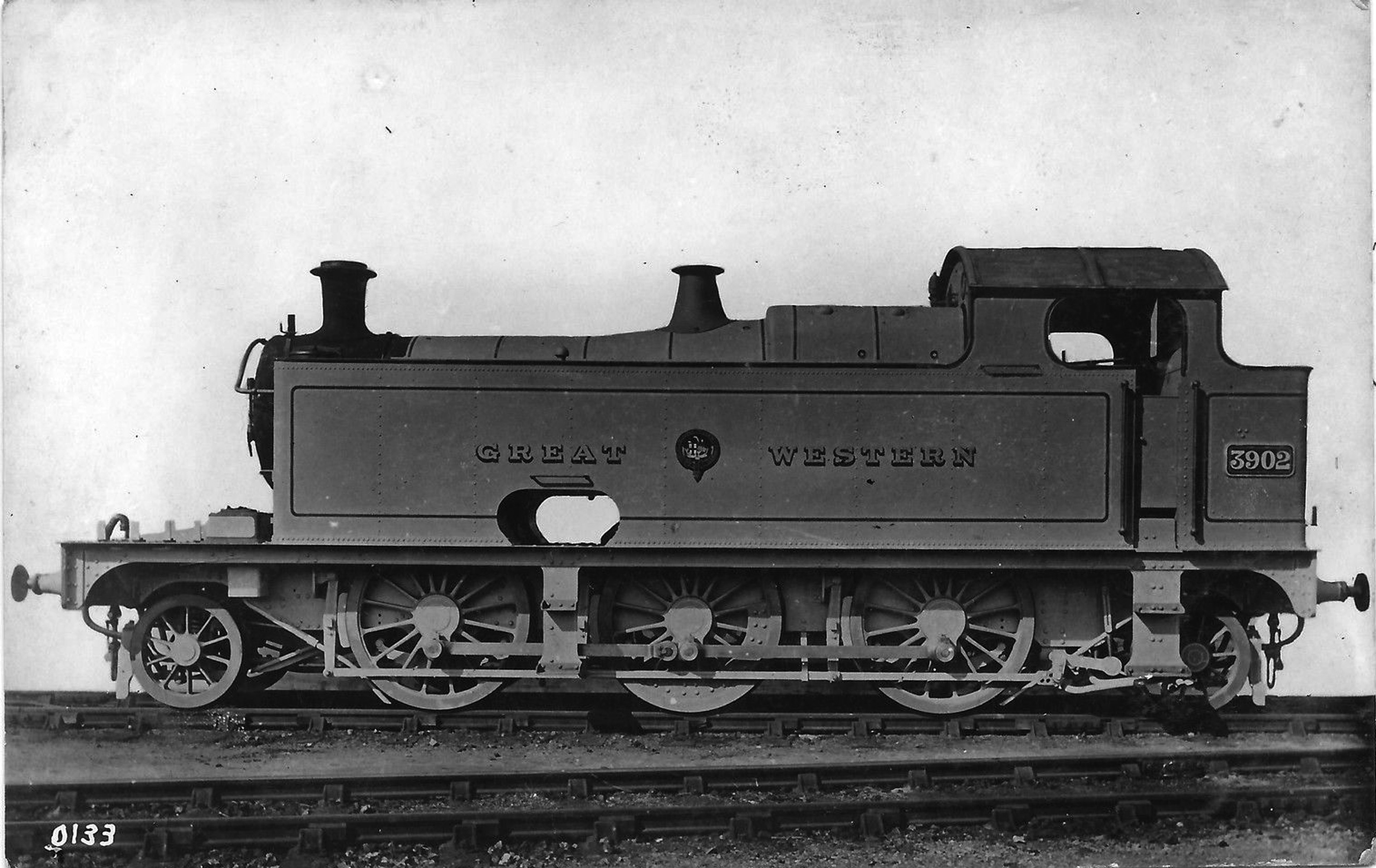
- 3902 as converted in 1907
Type and origin
- Power type: Steam
- Designer: William Dean, rebuilt by George Jackson Churchward
- Builder: Swindon Works
- Order number: Lot 167
- Serial number: not issued
- Build date: 1907
- Total produced: 20
Specifications
- Configuration
  - Whyte: 2-6-2T
- Gauge: 4 ft 8 1/2 in (1,435 mm) standard gauge
- Leading dia.: 3 ft 2 in (0.965 m)
- Driver dia.: 5 ft 2 in (1.575 m)
- Trailing dia.: 3 ft 2 in (0.965 m)
- Fuel type: Coal
- Water cap.: 1,500 imp gal (6,800 L; 1,800 US gal)
- Boiler: Standard No 5
- Boiler pressure: 200 psi (1.4 MPa)
- Cylinders: Two, inside
- Cylinder size: 17 in × 24 in (432 mm × 610 mm)
Performance figures
- Tractive effort: 20,155 lbf (89.65 kN)
Career
- Operators: Great Western Railway
- Class: 3900
- Power class: GWR: B
- Axle load class: GWR: Blue
- Withdrawn: 1931–1934
- Disposition: Scrapped

The Great Western Railway (GWR) 3901 Class is a class of 2-6-2T steam locomotives rebuilt from class 2301 'Dean Goods' 0-6-0 tender locomotives.

In 1907, a surplus of Dean Goods locomotives, and a requirement for more suburban tank locos, led to the rebuilding of twenty of the Dean Goods into 2-6-2T 'Prairie' tank locos. The inside cylinders and motion were retained, the frames were extended at each end, and leading and trailing pony trucks added, as were a Standard number 5 boiler, full-length side tanks (with a large cut-out to give access for oiling the motion) and a bunker. Locomotives 2491-2510 were rebuilt and renumbered 3901–3920. The locomotives were allocated to the Birmingham area to replace older 2-4-2T locomotives, having the advantage of greater adhesive weight.

Most remained in the Birmingham area until 1923, when they began to be sent elsewhere, and replaced by the Large Prairies. All the class was withdrawn between 1931 and 1934, and scrapped.
