= GWR 5100 Class =

Class of British steam locomotives

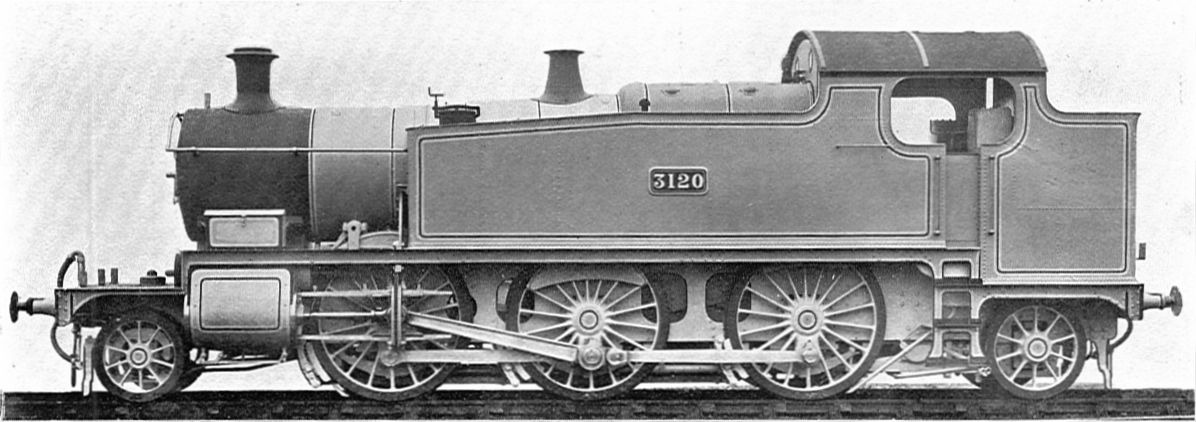
- 3120 as built in 1905
Type and origin
- Power type: Steam
- Designer: George Jackson Churchward
- Builder: GWR Swindon Works
- Order number: Lots 140, 150, 152, 159
- Serial number: 1992, 2066–2075, 2086–2096, 2138–2156
- Build date: 1903
- Total produced: 40
Specifications
- Configuration
  - Whyte: 2-6-2T
- Gauge: 4 ft 8 1/2 in (1,435 mm) standard gauge
- Leading dia.: 3 ft 2 in (0.965 m)
- Driver dia.: 5 ft 8 in (1.727 m)
- Trailing dia.: 3 ft 8 in (1.118 m)
- Length: 41 ft 0 in (12.50 m) over buffers
- Loco weight: 75 long tons 10 cwt (169,100 lb or 76.7 t) (76.7 t; 84.6 short tons) full
- Fuel type: Coal
- Water cap.: 2,000 imp gal (9,100 L; 2,400 US gal)
- Boiler: GWR Standard No. 2
- Boiler pressure: 200 lbf/in^{2} (1.38 MPa)
- Heating surface
  - Firebox: 122 sq ft (11.3 m^{2})
  - Tubes: 1,144 sq ft (106.3 m^{2})
- Cylinders: Two, outside
- Cylinder size: 18 1/2 in × 30 in (470 mm × 762 mm)
- Valve gear: Stephenson
- Valve type: Piston valves
- Train brakes: Vacuum
Performance figures
- Tractive effort: 5100: 25,670 lbf (114.2 kN); 8100: 28,000 lbf (120 kN)
Career
- Power class: 4MT
- Number in class: 40
- Numbers: 3100, 3111-3149 later 5100, 5111-5149
- First run: 1903
- Withdrawn: withdrawn 1938-9 for rebuilds withdrawn 1947-1958
- Disposition: All scrapped

The Great Western Railway (GWR) GWR 5100 Class (known as the 3100 class between 1912 and 1927) was a class of 2-6-2T side tank steam locomotives. It was the first of a series of broadly similar classes used principally for suburban passenger services.

== History ==
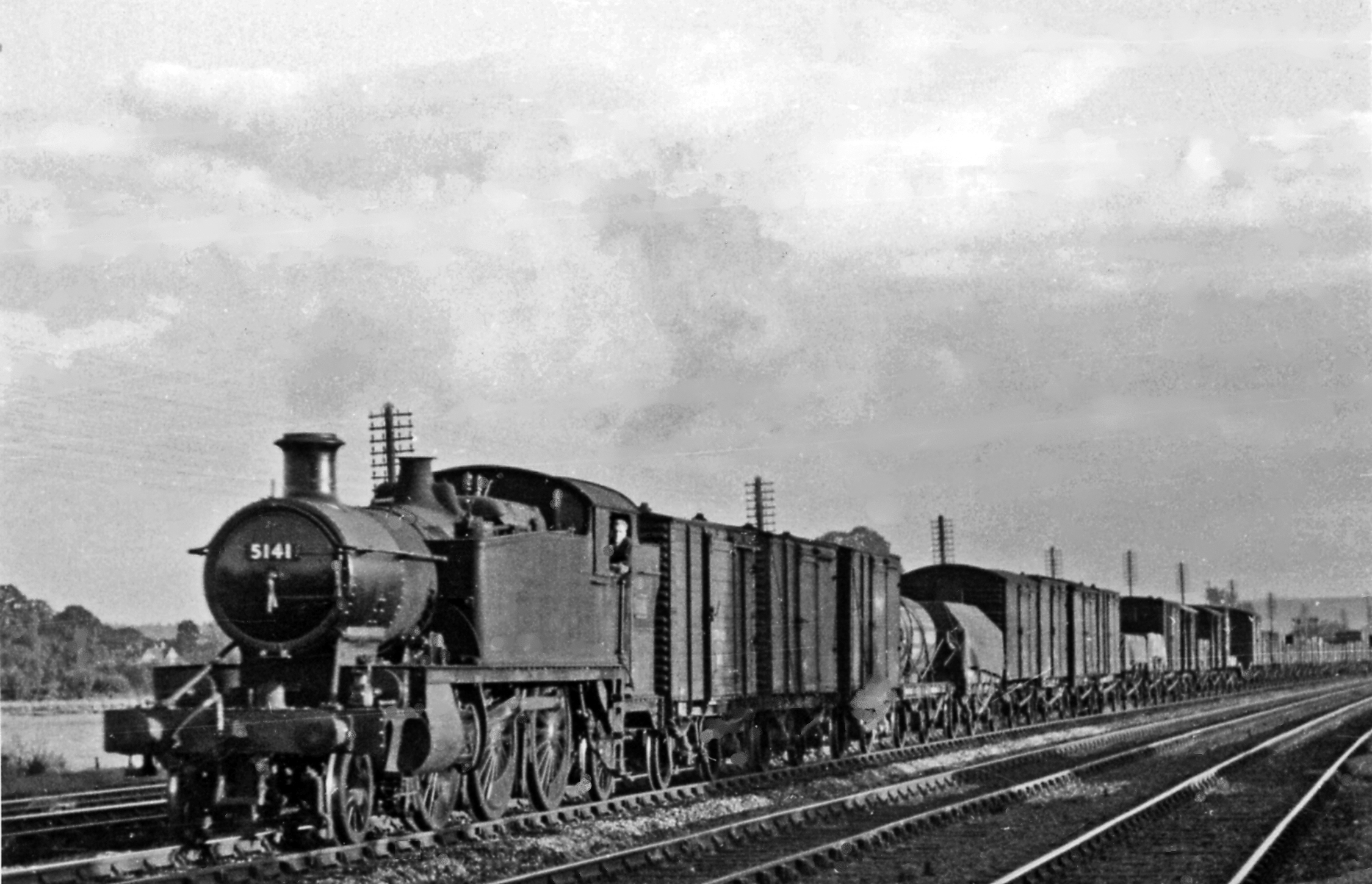
5141 (ex 3141) at Haresfield Naas Crossing in 1950

The class was developed from one of George Jackson Churchward's pioneer designs – No 99 – and a number of derivative classes were built from 1906 to 1950. The development is somewhat convoluted to follow, because of various renumberings and gaps in the number series as listed below.

No. 99 was built in 1903 and given an extended trial over the ensuing two years. Fitted with the standard number 2 boiler running at 200 psi (1.38 MPa), flat topped tanks and driving wheels of 5 feet 8 inches (1.727 m) in diameter, it was the forerunner of 289 similar locomotives that were to follow. 39 more examples were built to this initial design. This production batch differed from the prototype only in that the tank tops were sloping to aid visibility and the cab sides were incorporated into the tanks. The running numbers of this batch were 3111 to 3149 and the prototype was renumbered 3100 in 1912. They received enlarged coal bunkers. In 1927, after some improvements to weight distribution, the class was renumbered 5100 and 5111 to 5149.

None of the 5100 class have been preserved.

Table of orders and numbers
Year	Quantity	Lot No.	Works No.	Locomotive numbers	Notes
1903	1	140	1992	99	renumbered 3100 in 1912
1905	10	150	2066–2075	3111–3120	
1905	10	152	2085–2095	3121–3130	
1906	19	159	2138–2156	3131–3149	

== Developments of the 3100/5100 Class ==
The 3150 Class was a 1906 version of the 3100, fitted with the larger and heavier Standard 4 boiler. They were numbered from 3150 to 3190.

The 5101 Class were fundamentally Collett versions of the 5100 class, built from 1929 to 1949 with the Standard 2 boiler. They were numbered 5101–5110, 5150–5199 and 4100–4179.

The 1931 6100 Class were more powerful versions of the 5101, fitted with a version of the Standard 2 boiler with higher working pressure, giving the locomotives greater tractive effort. They were numbered 6100–6169.

The Collett 3100 Class were members of the 3150 class, rebuilt in 1938/39 with smaller driving wheels. They retained the larger Standard 4 boiler from the 3150s and were numbered 3100–3104.

The 8100 Class (see below) were members of the 5100 class rebuilt in 1938/39 with smaller driving wheels and the same higher pressure version of the Standard 2 boiler as the 6100 class. They were numbered 8100–8109.

== 8100 class ==
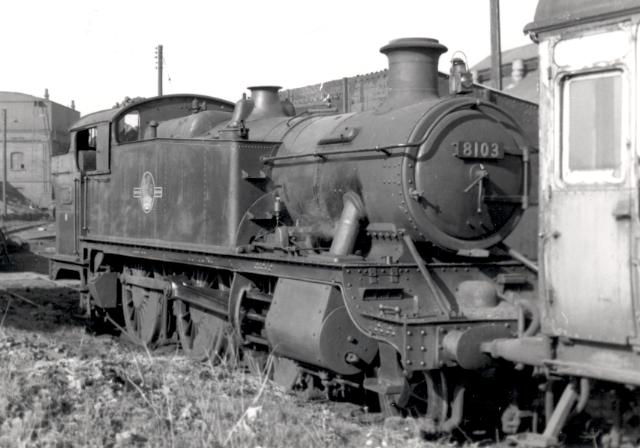
8100 Class rebuild 8103 (ex 5145) at Carmarthen loco shed on 16 April 1961

In 1938/39 ten members of the 5100 series were rebuilt with 5 feet 6 inches (1.676 m) driving wheels and 3-foot pony truck wheels. They retained the number 2 boiler, but again pressed to 225 psi as in the 6100. Numbers 5100 (the original 1903 prototype number 99 now being renumbered for the third time), 5123, 5118, 5145, 5124, 5126, 5120, 5116, 5133 and 5115, were renumbered 8100 to 8109. This 8100 class were intended to bolster the 6100 class on London suburban duties, with the smaller driving wheels giving a supposed benefit of better acceleration. Whatever the practical advantage in performance, the class became widely dispersed and locos were used alongside their predecessors indiscriminately.

None of the 8100 class have been preserved.

== GWR Prairies ==
The 2-6-2 wheel arrangement is nicknamed "Prairie". The Churchward 3100/5100, 3150, 5101, Collett 3100, 6100 and 8100 classes are collectively nicknamed "Large Prairies" while the smaller 4400, 4500 and 4575 classes are known as "Small Prairies".

== See also ==
- GWR 3150 Class
- GWR 5101 Class
- GWR 6100 Class
- GWR 3100 Class (1938)
- List of GWR standard classes with two outside cylinders
