= GWR 3100 Class =

Class of British steam locomotives

Type and origin
- Power type: Steam
- Designer: Churchward (rebuilt by Collett)
- Builder: GWR Swindon Works
- Order number: Lot 319
- Build date: 1906
- Rebuild date: 1938
- Number rebuilt: 5
Specifications
- Configuration
  - Whyte: 2-6-2T
  - UIC: 1'C1 h2t
- Gauge: 4 ft 8 1/2 in (1,435 mm) standard gauge
- Leading dia.: 3 ft 0 in (0.914 m)
- Driver dia.: 5 ft 3 in (1.600 m)
- Trailing dia.: 3 ft 8 in (1.118 m)
- Minimum curve: 6 chains (396 ft; 121 m) normal, 5 chains (330 ft; 101 m) slow
- Length: 41 ft 0 in (12.50 m) over buffers
- Width: 8 ft 11 1/4 in (2.724 m)
- Height: 13 ft 2 in (4.013 m)
- Axle load: 19 long tons 3 cwt (42,900 lb or 19.5 t) (21.4 short tons) full
- Adhesive weight: 57 long tons 6 cwt (128,400 lb or 58.2 t) (64.2 short tons) full
- Loco weight: 81 long tons 9 cwt (182,400 lb or 82.8 t) (91.2 short tons) full
- Fuel type: Coal
- Water cap.: 2,000 imp gal (9,100 L; 2,400 US gal)
- Firebox
  - Grate area: 20.56 sq ft (1.910 m^{2})
- Boiler: GWR Standard No. 4
- Boiler pressure: 225 lbf/in^{2} (1.55 MPa)
- Heating surface
  - Firebox: 128.72 sq ft (11.958 m^{2})
  - Tubes: 1,349 sq ft (125.3 m^{2})
- Superheater
  - Type: 4-element or 6-element
  - Heating area: 4-element: 136.64 sq ft (12.694 m^{2}), 6-element: 181.10 sq ft (16.825 m^{2})
- Cylinders: Two, outside
- Cylinder size: 18.5 in × 30 in (470 mm × 762 mm)
Performance figures
- Tractive effort: 31,170 lbf (138.7 kN)
Career
- Operators: GWR » BR
- Class: 3100
- Power class: GWR: D, BR: 4MT
- Numbers: 3100–3104
- Axle load class: GWR: Red
- Withdrawn: 1957–1960
- Disposition: All scrapped

The Great Western Railway (GWR) 3100 Class was a class of 2-6-2T side tank steam locomotive.

== History ==
This class of large prairie was created in 1938 when Collett rebuilt some of Churchward's 3150 Class engines for use as bankers, particularly from Severn Tunnel Junction shed. These engines used the same standard class 4 boiler, but with pressure increased to 225 psi (1,550 kPa) and smaller 5 feet 3 inches (1.600 m) driving wheels and a one-half inch (13 mm) increase in cylinder diameter. This raised their tractive effort to 31,170 pounds-force (138,700 N). Less noticeable was a 2 in (50.8 mm) reduction in pony truck wheel diameter to 3 ft 0 in (914 mm). Only five engines were ever modified, Nos. 3173, 3156, 3181, 3155 and 3179 which were rebuilt as 3100 to 3104 respectively. All members of the class were scrapped.

== See also ==
- GWR 3100/5100 Class (1906)
- GWR 3150 Class
- GWR 5101 Class
- GWR 6100 Class
- GWR 8100 Class
- List of GWR standard classes with two outside cylinders
