= GWR 3150 Class =

Class of 41 two-cylinder 2-6-2T locomotives

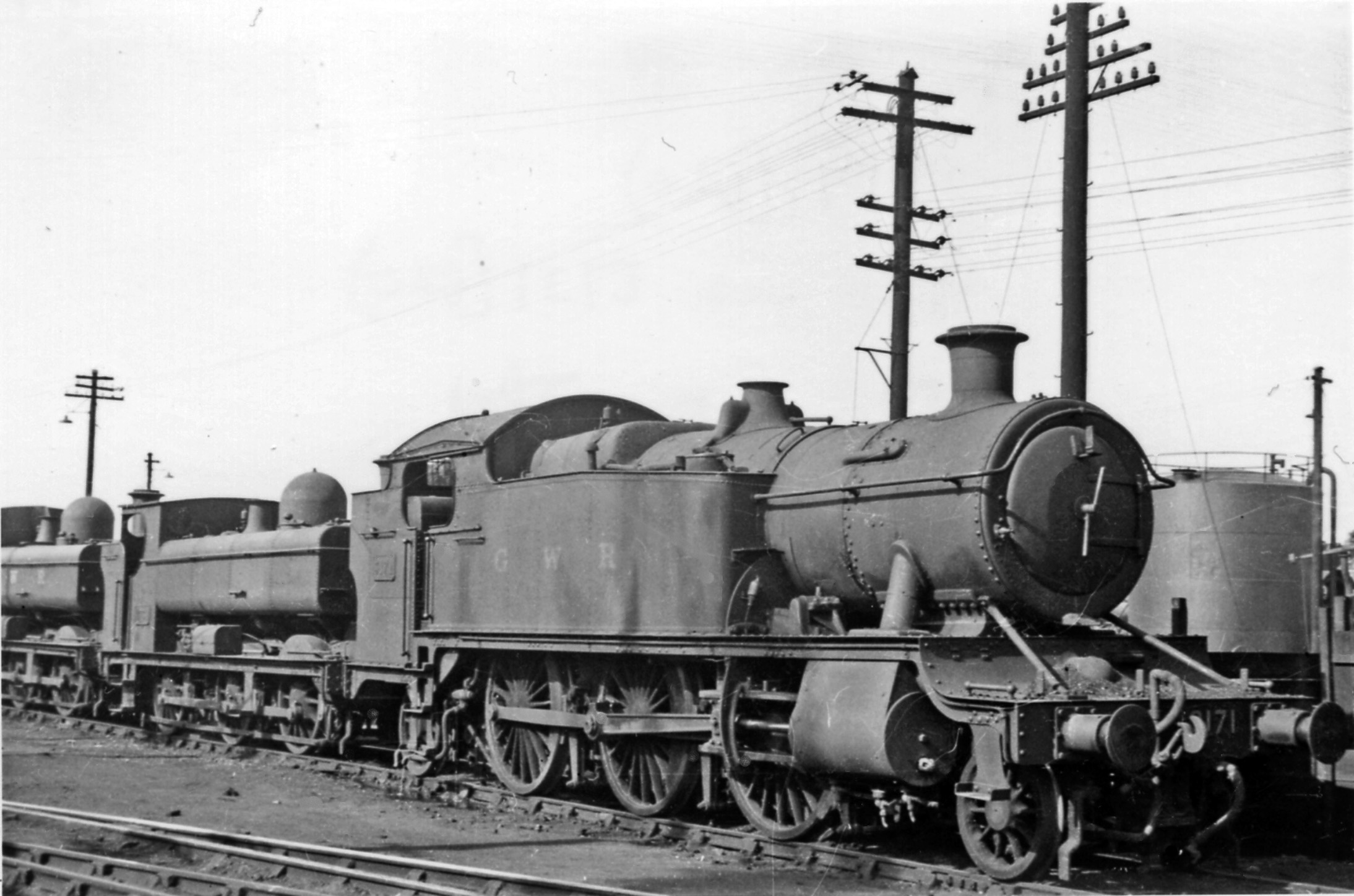
- 3171 at Gloucester (Horton Road) Depot 1948
Type and origin
- Power type: Steam
- Designer: George Jackson Churchward
- Builder: GWR Swindon Works
- Order number: Lots 159, 169, 172
- Serial number: 2157, 2239–2258, 2280–2299
- Build date: 1906–1908
- Total produced: 41
Specifications
- Configuration
  - Whyte: 2-6-2T
- Gauge: 4 ft 8 1/2 in (1,435 mm) standard gauge
- Leading dia.: 3 ft 2 in (0.965 m)
- Driver dia.: 5 ft 8 in (1.727 m)
- Trailing dia.: 3 ft 8 in (1.118 m)
- Length: 41 ft 0 in (12.50 m) over buffers
- Loco weight: 64 long tons 13 cwt (144,800 lb or 65.7 t) (65.7 t; 72.4 short tons) empty 81 long tons 12 cwt (182,800 lb or 82.9 t) (82.9 t; 91.4 short tons) full
- Fuel type: Coal
- Water cap.: 2,000 imp gal (9,100 L; 2,400 US gal)
- Firebox
  - Grate area: 20.56 sq ft (1.910 m^{2})
- Boiler: GWR Standard No. 4
- Boiler pressure: 200 lbf/in^{2} (1.38 MPa)
- Heating surface
  - Firebox: 128.72 sq ft (11.958 m^{2})
  - Tubes: 1,349.64 sq ft (125.386 m^{2})
- Cylinders: Two, outside
- Cylinder size: 18 1/2 in × 30 in (470 mm × 762 mm)
- Valve gear: Stephenson
- Valve type: Piston valves
- Train brakes: Vacuum
Performance figures
- Tractive effort: 25,670 lbf (114.2 kN)
Career
- Power class: 4MT
- Number in class: 41
- Numbers: 3150-3190
- First run: 1907
- Withdrawn: 1957-1960

The Great Western Railway (GWR) 3150 Class was a class of 2-6-2T side tank steam locomotive.

== History ==
Churchward based the 3150 class on his 3100 (later 5100) class. They used the larger and heavier Standard 4 boiler and so had greater boiler capacity, but were consequently heavier and thus restricted to Red routes. They were principally heavy suburban passenger traffic engines. Five of the class were rebuilt into the Collett 3100 Class. None of the class were preserved.

Table of orders and numbers
Year	Quantity	Lot No.	Works Nos.	Locomotive numbers	Notes
1906	1	159	2157	3150	
1907	20	169	2239–2258	3151–3170	
1907–08	20	172	2280–2299	3171–3190	

== See also ==
- GWR 3100/5100 Class (1906)
- GWR 5101 Class
- GWR 6100 Class
- GWR 3100 Class (1938)
- GWR 8100 Class
- List of GWR standard classes with two outside cylinders
