= GWR 4575 Class =

British steam locomotives

GWR 4575 class
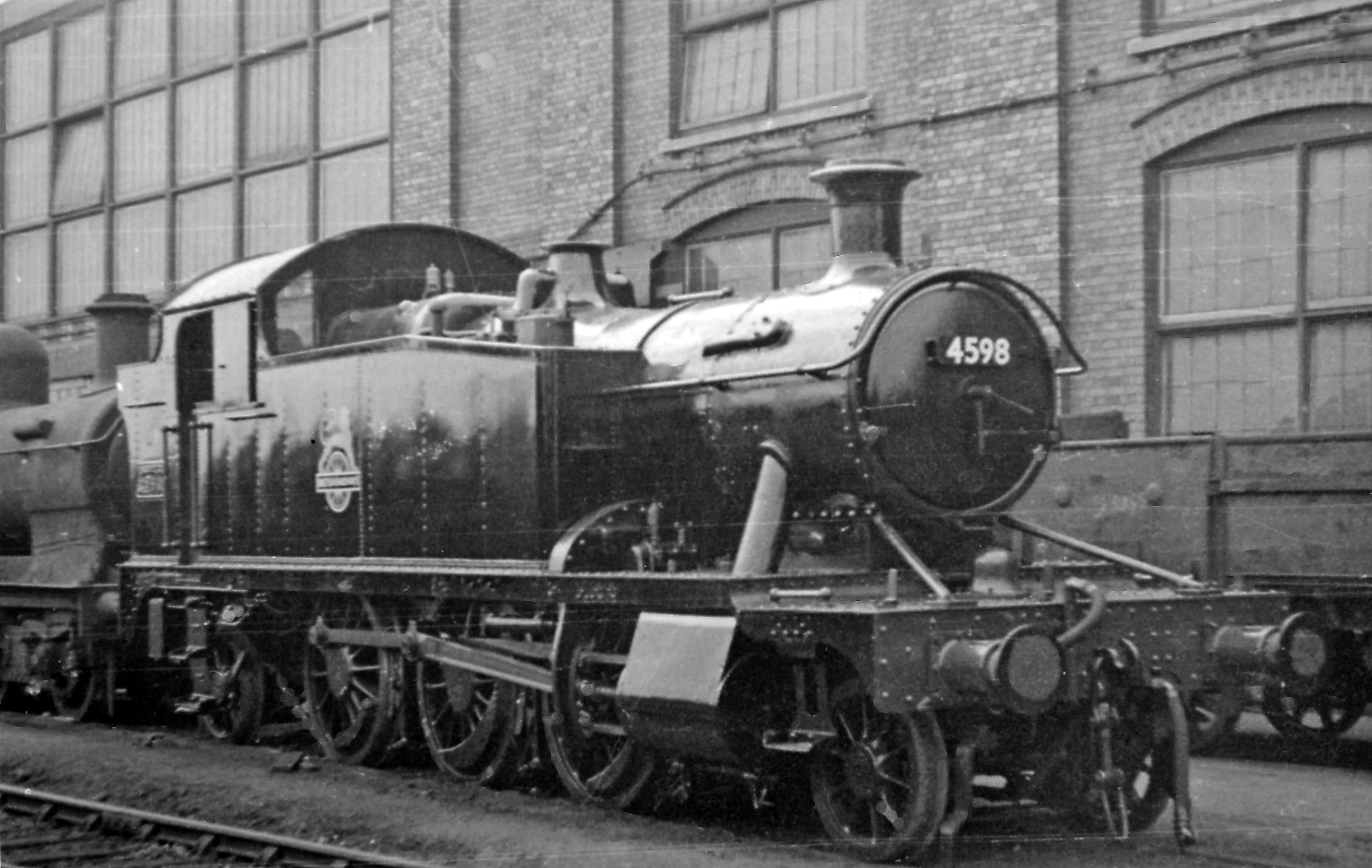
- 4598 at Swindon Works in 1954
Type and origin
- Power type: Steam
- Designer: Charles Collett
- Builder: GWR Swindon Works
- Order number: Lots 242, 249, 251, 253
- Build date: 1927–1929
- Total produced: 100
Specifications
- Configuration
  - Whyte: 2-6-2T
  - UIC: 1′C1′ h2t
- Gauge: 4 ft 8 1/2 in (1,435 mm) standard gauge
- Leading dia.: 3 ft 2 in (0.965 m)
- Driver dia.: 4 ft 7 1/2 in (1.410 m)
- Trailing dia.: 3 ft 2 in (0.965 m)
- Minimum curve: 5 chains (330 ft; 100 m) normal, 4.5 chains (300 ft; 91 m) slow
- Wheelbase: 26 ft 10 in (8.18 m)
- Length: 36 ft 4 1/2 in (11.09 m) over buffers
- Width: 8 ft 9 in (2.667 m)
- Height: 13 ft 0 in (3.962 m)
- Axle load: 15 long tons 11 cwt (34,800 lb or 15.8 t) (17.4 short tons) full
- Adhesive weight: 46 long tons 5 cwt (103,600 lb or 47 t) (51.8 short tons) full
- Loco weight: 61 long tons 0 cwt (136,600 lb or 62 t) (68.3 short tons) full
- Fuel type: Coal
- Fuel capacity: 3 long tons 14 cwt (8,300 lb or 3.8 t)
- Water cap.: 1,300 imp gal (5,900 L; 1,600 US gal)
- Firebox
  - Grate area: 16.6 sq ft (1.54 m^{2})
- Boiler: GWR Standard No. 5
- Boiler pressure: 200 lbf/in^{2} (1.38 MPa)
- Heating surface
  - Firebox: 94.25 sq ft (8.756 m^{2})
  - Tubes: 992.51 sq ft (92.207 m^{2})
- Superheater
  - Type: 4-element or 6-element
  - Heating area: 4-element: 52.98 sq ft (4.922 m^{2}), 6-element: 69.84 sq ft (6.488 m^{2})
- Cylinders: Two, outside
- Cylinder size: 17 in × 24 in (432 mm × 610 mm)
- Valve gear: Stephenson
- Valve type: Piston valves
- Train brakes: Vacuum
Performance figures
- Tractive effort: 21,250 lbf (94.5 kN)
Career
- Operators: GWR » BR
- Class: 4575
- Power class: GWR: C, BR: 4MT
- Number in class: 100
- Numbers: 4575–4599, 5500–5574
- Nicknames: Small Prairie
- Axle load class: GWR: Yellow
- Withdrawn: 1956–1964
- Preserved: 4588, 5521, 5526, 5532, 5538, 5539, 5541, 5542, 5552, 5553, 5572
- Disposition: 11 preserved, remainder scrapped

The Great Western Railway (GWR) 4575 Class is a class of 2-6-2T British steam locomotives.

== History ==
They were designed as small mixed traffic branch locomotives, mainly used on branch lines. They were a development of Churchward's 4500 Class with larger side tanks and increased water capacity. 100 were built numbered 4575–4599 and 5500–5574. 15 (Nos. 4578/81/89, 5511/24/29/34/35/45/55/59/60/68/72/74) were fitted with auto apparatus in 1953 to enable them to run push-pull trains on South Wales lines with auto trailers.

They often are referred to as Small Prairie Class tank locomotives.

Table of orders and numbers
| Year | Quantity | Lot No. | Locomotive numbers | Notes |
|---|---|---|---|---|
| 1927 | 30 | 242 | 4575–4599, 5500–5504 | |
| 1927 | 20 | 249 | 5505–5524 | |
| 1928 | 20 | 251 | 5525–5544 | |
| 1928–29 | 30 | 253 | 5545–5574 | |

== Preservation ==
11 members of the class have been preserved:

| Number and name | Home | Status | Image |
|---|---|---|---|
| 4588 | Peak Rail | Has run in preservation, but currently out of service requiring overhaul. It was sold from the Dartmouth Steam Railway in 2015 and is now owned by Mike Thompson and based at Peak Rail. | |
| 5521/L.150 | Gwili Railway | Built in 1927, withdrawn by BR in April 1962 and sent to Woodham Brothers scrapyard, having run just over 1,000,000 miles (1,600,000 km). Saved with classmates 4561 and 5542 by the West Somerset Railway Association, but was sold with 5542 to repay purchase debts and to fund restoration of 4561. Bought by Richard and William Parker in 1980, it was restored at the Flour Mill, Forest of Dean from 2004 to 2007. It was featured in the 2007 Wolsztyn Parade, then travelled to Budapest, Hungary where it worked intermittently with MAV Nosztalgia, including piloting the Orient Express. It returned to Poland in 2008, operating suburban services from Wroclaw to Jelcz Laskowice. After a third appearance at the 2009 Wolsztyn Parade, it was returned to England. In May 2013, it was painted in London Transport livery and numbered L.150 to commemorate the 150th anniversary of the Metropolitan line. Returned to traffic in 2021 following overhaul. Bought by the Gwili Railway Company in 2025. | |
| 5526 | South Devon Railway | On loan to the Gwili Railway. Boiler ticket expires in 2027. | |
| 5532 | Llangollen Railway | Under restoration. | |
| 5538 | The Flour Mill, Forest of Dean, Gloucestershire | Under restoration. Previously displayed in Barry Island. | |
| 5539 | Barry Tourist Railway | Under restoration as of 2026. Previously part of the Barry Ten until 2006. | |
| 5541 | Dean Forest Railway | Currently operational as of 2023. Boiler ticket expires in 2024. | |
| 5542 | South Devon Railway | Currently under overhaul at the South Devon Railway. This locomotive has visited several preserved railways throughout her preservation career. | |
| 5552 | Bodmin and Wenford Railway | Returned to service in 2023 after overhaul, having previously run from 2003 to 2013. | |
| 5553 | Peak Rail | Owned by Pete Waterman. Last steam engine to leave Woodham Brothers scrapyard in Barry, Vale of Glamorgan, South Wales, in January 1990. First resteamed in 2002, running until 2012, mostly at the West Somerset Railway. Moved in 2015 from Crewe Heritage Centre for overhaul, which was completed in 2021 at Peak Rail. Currently operational, boiler ticket expires 2031. | |
| 5572 | Didcot Railway Centre | On static display awaiting overhaul. | |

Two members of the class have also briefly been out on the mainline: 5521 and 5572. 5521 was shipped to Poland in 2007 to take part in the Wolsztyn Parade, as well as briefly piloting the Orient Express. 5572 made an appearance at an open day in Reading as part of the GWR 150 celebrations in 1985, arriving under its own power. When returning to Didcot again under its own power the engine also hauled the replica broad gauge locomotive "Iron Duke" alongside the preserved GWR Railcar W22W.

== Models and toys ==
Lima made a model of the 4575 class, number 4589, in GWR green, also a British Railways black-liveried version, running number 5574. Bachmann Branchline have for many years made various versions of the 4575 Class.

== See also ==
- GWR 4400 Class
- GWR 4500 Class
- List of GWR standard classes with two outside cylinders
