= GWR 6100 Class =

British steam locomotive class (1931–1965)

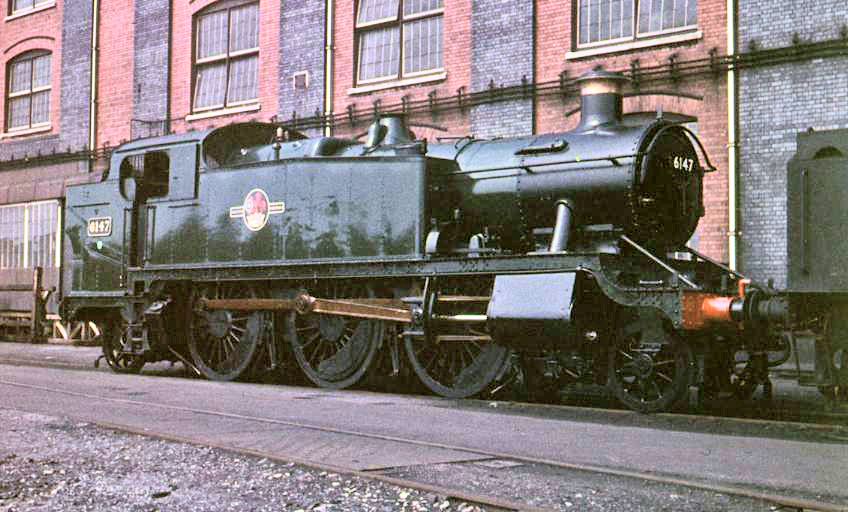
- 6147 at Swindon Works on 26 April 1964 after overhaul
Type and origin
- Power type: Steam
- Designer: Charles Collett
- Builder: GWR Swindon Works
- Order number: Lots 269, 278, 291
- Build date: 1931–1933, 1935
- Total produced: 70
Specifications
- Configuration
  - Whyte: 2-6-2T
  - UIC: 1′C1′ h2t
- Gauge: 4 ft 8 1/2 in (1,435 mm) standard gauge
- Leading dia.: 3 ft 2 in (0.965 m)
- Driver dia.: 5 ft 8 in (1.727 m)
- Trailing dia.: 3 ft 8 in (1.118 m)
- Minimum curve: 6 chains (396 ft; 121 m) normal, 5 chains (330 ft; 101 m) slow
- Length: 41 ft 0 in (12.50 m) over buffers
- Width: 8 ft 11 1/4 in (2.724 m)
- Height: 12 ft 7 5/8 in (3.851 m)
- Axle load: 17 long tons 12 cwt (39,400 lb or 17.9 t); 19.7 short tons full
- Adhesive weight: 52 long tons 13 cwt (117,900 lb or 53.5 t); 58.9 short tons full
- Loco weight: 78 long tons 9 cwt (175,700 lb or 79.7 t); 87.9 short tons full
- Fuel type: Coal
- Water cap.: 2,000 imp gal (9,100 L; 2,400 US gal)
- Firebox
  - Grate area: 20.35 sq ft (1.891 m^{2})
- Boiler pressure: 225 lbf/in^{2} (1.55 MPa)
- Heating surface
  - Firebox: 121.80 sq ft (11.316 m^{2})
  - Tubes: 1,145.00 sq ft (106.374 m^{2})
- Superheater
  - Type: 4-element or 6-element
  - Heating area: 4-element: 58.56 sq ft (5.440 m^{2}), 6-element: 77.68 sq ft (7.217 m^{2})
- Cylinders: Two, outside
- Cylinder size: 18 in × 30 in (457 mm × 762 mm)
- Valve gear: Stephenson
- Valve type: piston valves
Performance figures
- Tractive effort: 27,340 lbf (121.61 kN)
Career
- Operators: GWR » BR
- Class: 6100
- Power class: GWR: D BR: 4MT
- Numbers: 6100–6169
- Axle load class: GWR: Blue
- Withdrawn: 1958–1965
- Disposition: One preserved, remainder scrapped

The GWR 6100 Class is a class of 2-6-2T side tank steam locomotives.

== History ==
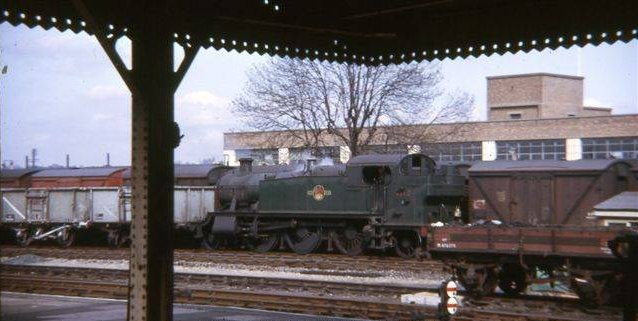
6165 at Reading with train of mineral wagons in May 1964

The class was designed by Charles Collett and introduced in 1931, and were a straightforward development of the earlier 5101 class (and for that matter the 1905 3100/5100 class). The main difference from their predecessors was an increased boiler pressure of 225 psi (1.55 MPa) with a consequent increase in tractive effort.

There were seventy in the class, built in two batches in 1931–1933 and 1935. They were frequently referred to by trainspotters as 'Tanner One-ers' – being a reference to their '61xx' numbering sequence using colloquial terms for a sixpence and a penny.

The class was specifically built for commuter services in the London area where they replaced the ageing 2221 class on these services. They lasted to the end of steam on the Western Region of British Railways in 1965, never straying far from their home turf. Typical duties were Paddington to Aylesbury via High Wycombe, and from the same terminus to Oxford, Windsor, Reading and Basingstoke. They were mainly shedded at Old Oak Common, Southall, Slough, Reading and Aylesbury throughout their lives. In the early 1960s, the advent of the first generation diesel multiple units made them semi-redundant though generally far from worn out. Their last few years saw them on more menial duties, as in the adjacent photograph, until scrapping.

Table of orders and numbers
Year	Quantity	Lot No.	Locomotive numbers	Notes
1931	30	269	6100–6129	
1932–33	30	278	6130–6159	
1935	10	291	6160–6169	

== Preservation ==
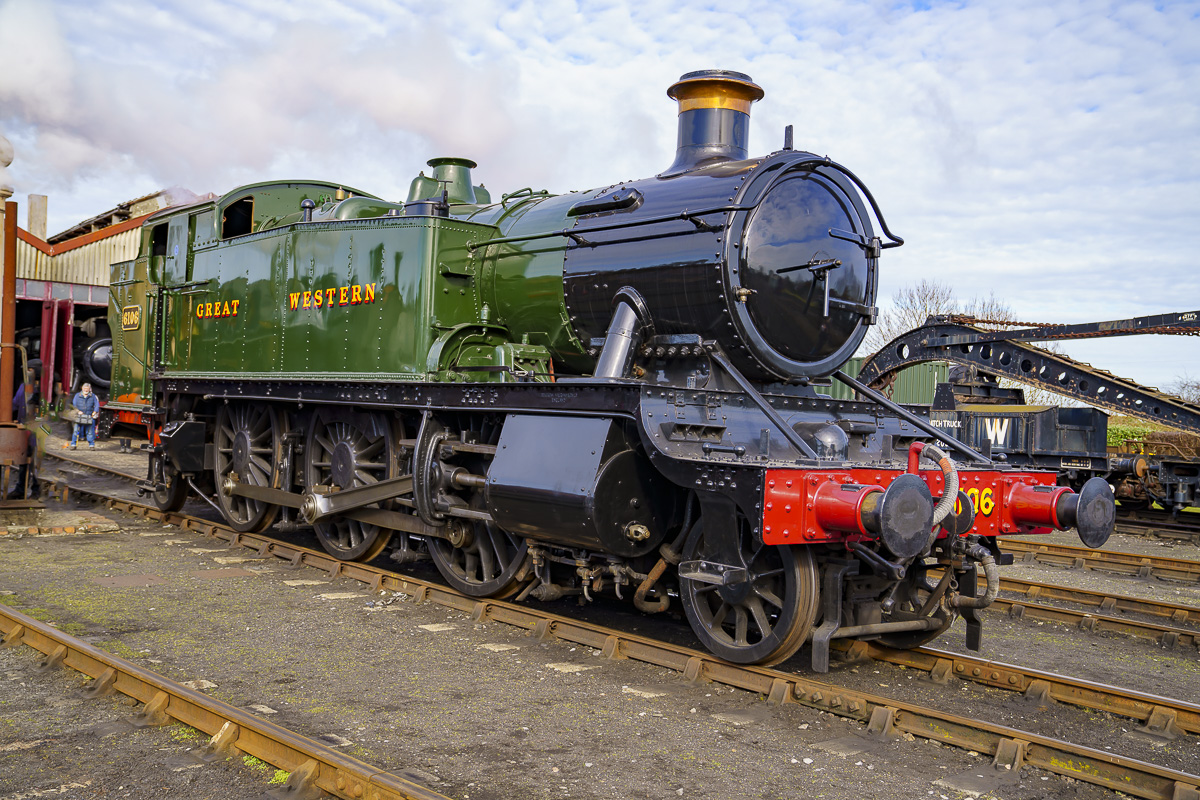
6106 at Didcot in 2023.

One locomotive, 6106, has survived into preservation, and is at Didcot Railway Centre, though currently non-operational.

== Model railways ==
The erstwhile Kitmaster company produced an unpowered polystyrene injection moulded model kit for OO gauge. In late 1962, the Kitmaster brand was sold by its parent company (Rosebud Dolls) to Airfix, who transferred the moulding tools to their own factory; they re-introduced some of the former Kitmaster range, including this model. The tools were subsequently sold again to Dapol who have also produced this model. Mainline Railways had OO gauge Class 6100 models in their catalogue in 1983, with models in GWR green and BR lined green. Dapol announced in 2017 that it was producing a completely new OO gauge model of the class. Hornby Railways is also retooling their OO gauge model of this class.

For some time Graham Farish have produced a British N gauge model, it is dated compared with more modern models and its driving wheels are scale for the 3100 class, i.e. 5 feet 3 inches, but is still a reasonable representation which forms a good base to add detail to.

Triang also produced a powered model of 6157 in TT scale.

== See also ==
- GWR 3100/5100 Class (1906)
- GWR 3150 Class
- GWR 5101 Class
- GWR 3100 Class (1938)
- GWR 8100 Class
- List of GWR standard classes with two outside cylinders
