= GWR 4500 Class =

Class of steam locomotive

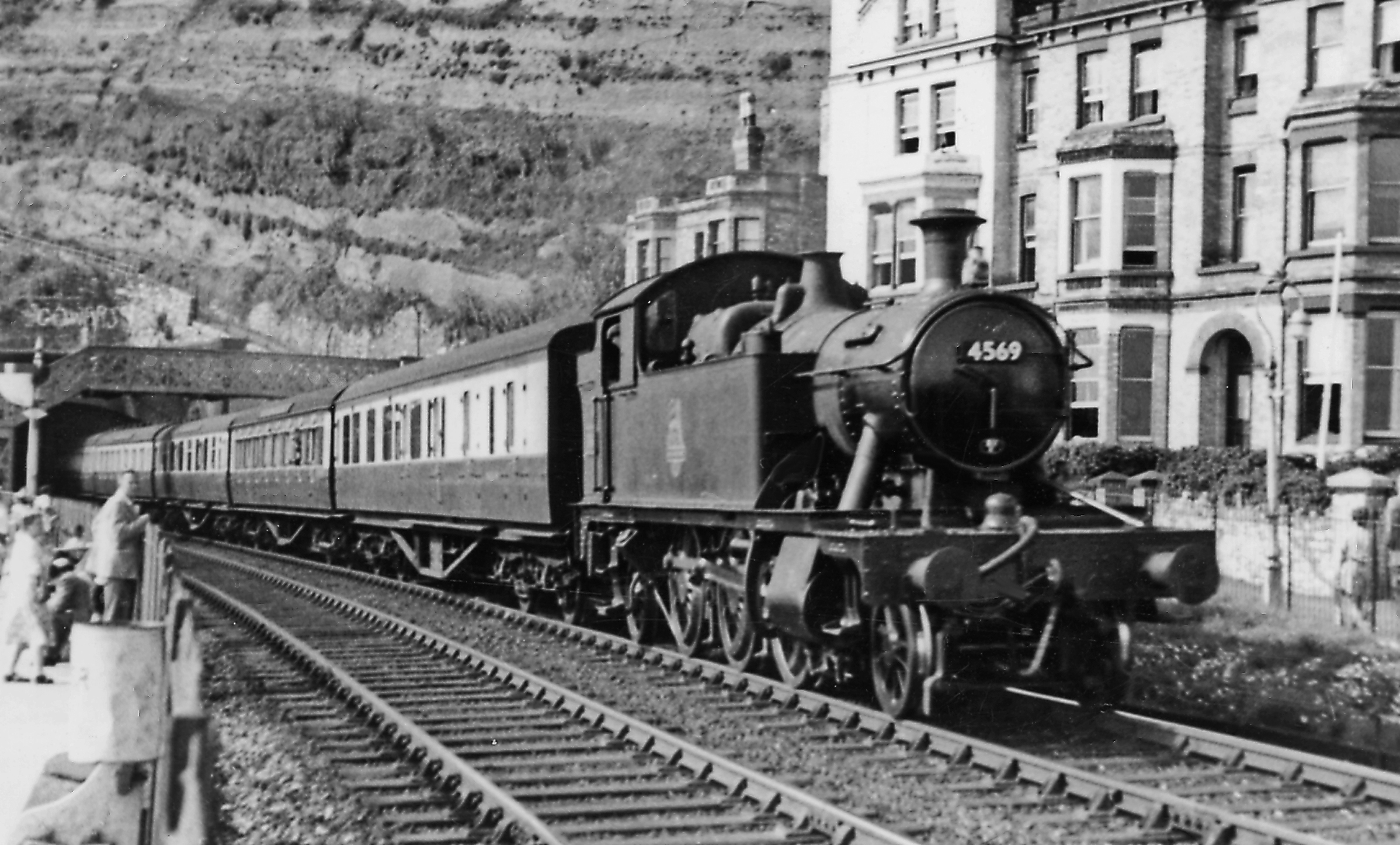
- 4569 at Dawlish in 1954
Type and origin
- Power type: Steam
- Designer: George Jackson Churchward
- Builder: Wolverhampton Works (20); Swindon Works (55)
- Order number: Wolverhampton: Lot N3; Swindon: Lots 174, 191, 201, 226
- Serial number: Wolverhampton 775–794; Swindon: 2310–2319, 2496–2505, 2597–2611
- Build date: 1906–1924
- Total produced: 75
Specifications
- Configuration
  - Whyte: 2-6-2T
- Gauge: 4 ft 8 1/2 in (1,435 mm) standard gauge
- Driver dia.: 4 ft 7 1/2 in (1.410 m)
- Loco weight: 57 long tons (58 t; 64 short tons)
- Fuel type: Coal
- Fuel capacity: Originally: 3 long tons 0 cwt (6,700 lb or 3 t); From 1924 onwards: 3 long tons 14 cwt (8,300 lb or 3.8 t)
- Water cap.: 1,000 imp gal (4,500 L; 1,200 US gal)
- Boiler
  - Type: Standard 5
- Boiler pressure: 200 psi (1.4 MPa)
- Cylinders: Two, outside
- Cylinder size: 17 in × 24 in (432 mm × 610 mm)
Performance figures
- Tractive effort: 21,250 lbf (94.5 kN)
Career
- Operators: Great Western Railway; British Railways
- Class: 4500
- Power class: GWR: C; BR: 4MT
- Axle load class: GWR: Yellow
- Locale: Western Region
- Withdrawn: February 1950 – September 1964
- Disposition: Three preserved, remainder scrapped

The Great Western Railway (GWR) 4500 Class or Small Prairie is a class of 2-6-2T steam locomotives.

== History ==
They were designed as small mixed traffic locomotives, mainly used on branch lines. The design was based on the earlier 4400 Class, but with larger driving wheels and altered wheel spacing. This gave them extra speed — capable of 60 mph (97 km/h) in service. A total of 75 were built; 55 were built in four batches between 1906 and 1915 and a fifth batch of 20 locos was built in 1924, during Collett's tenure at Swindon. The first two batches were originally numbered 2161–2190 but were renumbered 4500–4529 during 1912. The first batch (2161–2180) is significant in that it was the last batch of locos built at Stafford Road Works, Wolverhampton. Of this batch 2168 (as 4507) was the last Wolverhampton-built loco to remain in service with BR, not being withdrawn until 1963. The final two batches built were nos. 4530–4554 in 1913-15 and nos. 4555–4574 in 1924.

Table of orders and numbers
Year	Quantity	Lot No.	Works Nos.	Locomotive numbers	Notes
1906–08	20	Wolverhampton N3	Wolverhampton 775–794	2161–2180	renumbered 4500–4519 in 1912
1909–10	10	Swindon 174	Swindon 2310–2319	2181–2190	renumbered 4520–4529 in 1912
1913	10	Swindon 193	Swindon 2516–2525	4530–4539	
1914–15	15	Swindon 201	Swindon 2597–2611	4540–4554	
1924	20	Swindon 226	—	4555–4574	

The 4575 Class was a later development with larger side tanks.

=== Rhondda and Swansea Bay Railway and Port Talbot Railway ===
The Rhondda and Swansea Bay Railway (R&SBR) had been worked by the GWR since 1 July 1906, although it was not absorbed until 1 January 1922. In April 1907, the GWR sent three new locomotives of the first batch, nos. 2165–7, to the R&SBR; these were given R&SBR numbers 31–33. The Port Talbot Railway (PTR) was absorbed by the GWR on 1 January 1908, but its locomotive fleet remained separate until 1 January 1922. In March 1909, R&SBR nos. 31 and 32 were transferred to the PTR, regaining their GWR numbers 2165 and 2166. These two were returned to the GWR in 1912, being renumbered 4504 and 4505 in December that year. No. 33 was not returned until January 1914, when it was renumbered 4506.

== Preservation ==
Three of the class still exist, two of them survivors from Woodham Brothers scrapyard in Barry, Vale of Glamorgan, South Wales. All of them have run in preservation.

=== 4555: Warrior ===
4555 was bought in working order from British Railways by Patrick Whitehouse and fellow Talyllyn Railway member Pat Garland, so has never had to be restored. Originally working on the Dart Valley Railway, she later moved to the Dartmouth Steam Railway. She returned to steam in 2020 after having been under a major overhaul since 2014. Currently on a loan to the East Somerset Railway from March 2020. Went on loan to the Chinnor & Princes Risborough Railway for the 2024 season. She currently carries the name: Warrior.

=== 4561 ===
This locomotive left Woodham Brothers in September 1975. It is currently undergoing an extensive overhaul on the West Somerset Railway, having been out of service since 1998.

=== 4566 ===
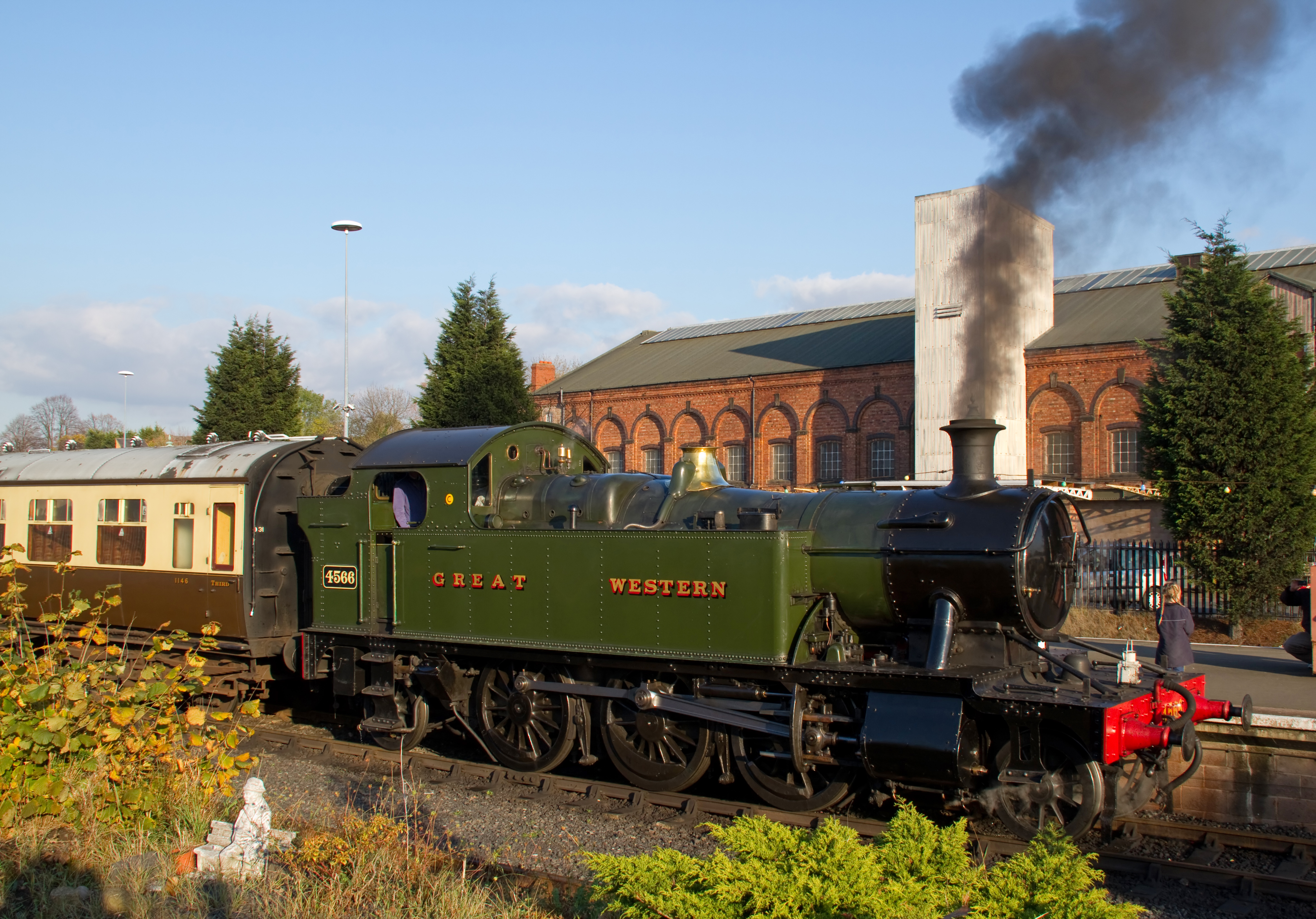
4566 waiting at Kidderminster

Currently stored out of service on the Severn Valley Railway awaiting an overhaul, this locomotive left Woodham Brothers in August 1970. It returned to service in late 2006 following an overhaul and after several years painted in Great Western green, was repainted into BR unlined black with the early crest for the first time in preservation. It was withdrawn from service in January 2017 following the expiry of her boiler certificate. It is on display inside the Engine House at Highley until its turn to overhaul comes again.

== Model railways ==
In 2004, Bachmann introduced six model versions of the locomotive in OO gauge: These were locomotives 4569 in BR lined green; 4550, 5531 and 5555 in GWR green; and 4573 and 5500 in BR black.

== See also ==
- GWR 4400 Class
- GWR 4575 Class
- List of GWR standard classes with two outside cylinders
