= GWR County Class =

GWR County Class may refer to the Great Western Railway County Class steam locomotives:

- GWR 3800 Class "Churchward County" 4-4-0
- GWR 2221 Class 4-4-2 tank version of the 4-4-0
- GWR 1000 Class "Hawksworth County" 4-6-0
