= County class =

County class may refer to:

- County-class destroyer, a post–World War II class of guided missile destroyers
- County-class cruiser, pre–World War II class of heavy cruiser
- The County class of Great Western Railway locomotives, were both a class of 4-4-0 locomotives built between 1904 and 1912 and a class of 4-6-0 locomotives built between 1945 and 1947
- Monmouth-class cruiser of pre–World War I armoured cruisers, also known as County class
- Talbot County-class tank landing ship, a post–World War II class of landing ships
- County-class patrol vessel, a class of patrol vessel operated by the Jamaican Coast Guard
