= George Jackson Churchward =

English railway engineer (1857–1933)

George Jackson Churchward CBE
- Born: 31 January 1857; Stoke Gabriel, Devon, England
- Died: 19 December 1933 (aged 76); Swindon, Wiltshire, England
- Occupation: Mechanical engineer
- Awards: CBE

George Jackson Churchward CBE (31 January 1857 – 19 December 1933) was an English railway engineer, and was chief mechanical engineer of the Great Western Railway (GWR) in the United Kingdom from 1902 to 1922.

== Early life ==
Churchward was born at Rowes Farm, Stoke Gabriel, Devon, where his ancestors (the senior line residing at Hill House; his paternal grandfather, Matthew, was the younger son of the head of the family) had been squires since 1457. He was the first son in a family of three sons and two daughters, brothers John (b.1858) and James (b.1860) and sisters Mary (b.1863) and Adelina (b.1870). His father, George Churchward, a farmer, married his cousin, Adelina Mary, daughter of Thomas Churchward, of Paignton, Devon, a corn and cider merchant. He was educated at the King Edward VI Grammar School, contained within the Mansion House on Fore Street, Totnes, Devon. His father's cousin, Frederick Churchward, head of the family, arranged private tuition at Hill House during the school holidays.

== Early career ==
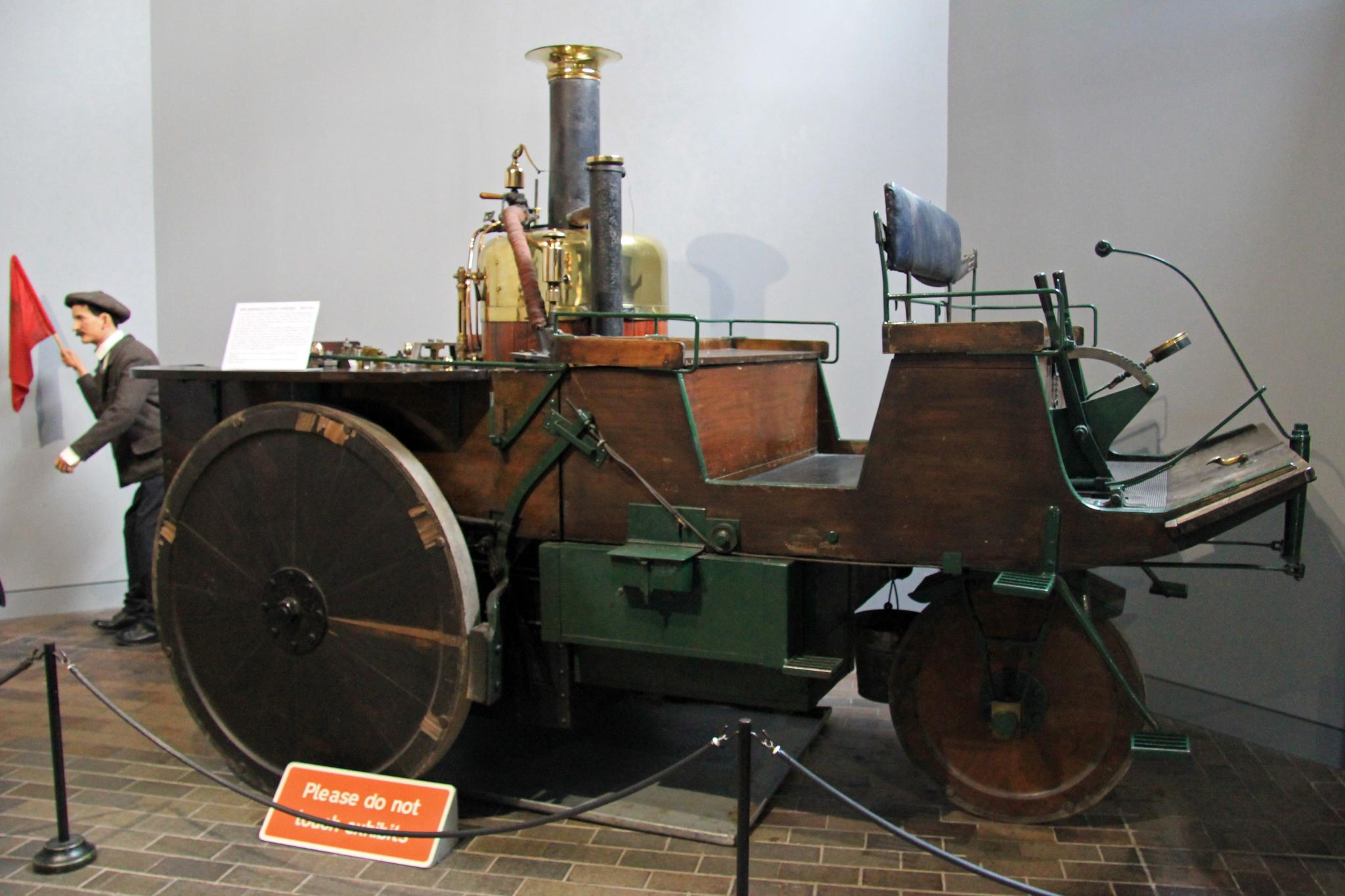
The Grenville steam carriage preserved at the National Motor Museum, Beaulieu

He started his engineering training in 1871 with John Wright, the Locomotive Superintendent of the South Devon, Cornwall and West Cornwall railways, at the Newton Abbot works of the South Devon Railway. While there, he and his fellow pupil Robert Neville-Grenville (Note: Griffiths incorrectly has 'Richard Neville Grenville', with no hyphen) developed a steam-powered car based on the boiler from a Merryweather fire-engine.

When the GWR took over the South Devon Railway in 1876, Churchward had to move to the Swindon Works. In 1877, at the end of his pupilage, he moved to the drawing office, where he worked with "Young Joe" Armstrong to develop a vacuum brake. He was appointed Inspecting Engineer in June 1882, and six months later became assistant to the Carriage Works Manager, James Holden, taking over as Manager on Holden's departure in 1885. Ten years later he became Assistant Works Manager, and soon after Manager, of the locomotive works, and in 1897 became William Dean's Chief Assistant and natural successor.

After 5 years as Chief Assistant, during most of which time Dean was ill and delegating much of his design work to Churchward, in 1902 he formally succeeded Dean as Locomotive Superintendent. In 1900 he became the first mayor of Swindon.

== Chief Mechanical Engineer ==
In the 19th and early 20th century, railway companies were fiercely competitive. Speed meant revenue and speed was dependent on engineering. Churchward delivered to the GWR from Swindon a series of class-leading and innovative locomotives. Arguably, from the early 1900s to the 1920s the Great Western's 2-cylinder and 4-cylinder 4-6-0 designs were substantially superior to any class of locomotive of the other British railway companies. On one occasion, the GWR's directors confronted Churchward, and demanded to know why the London and North Western Railway were able to build three 4-6-0 locomotives for the price of two of Churchward's "Stars". Churchward allegedly gave a terse response: "Because one of mine could pull two of their bloody things backwards!"

The biggest engineering challenge of the GWR's operations was travelling over the South Devon Banks, a series of steep inclines linking Exeter and Plymouth in Devon, on the GWR's most important route. Although speed was a key competitive driver across the whole GWR route, the South Devon Banks rewarded sure-footed locomotive designs with good adhesion. The largest opportunity to any GWR Chief Mechanical Engineer was the resulting large loading gauge legacy of the GWR's conversion from Brunel's broad gauge track to standard gauge, allowing for wider and higher designs than any of the other later Big Four railway companies.

=== Philosophy ===
Churchward's design philosophy followed a number of streams of development, for which he thoroughly researched both competitor UK designs, as well as European and North American locomotives.

Following principles based on Belgian inventor Alfred Belpaire, Churchward preferred free steaming boilers. This resulted in his use of a Belpaire-style rectangular firebox, which due to its greater surface area for evaporation was less prone to foaming and carry over of water to the cylinders. Churchward inherited from Dean a series of parallel cylindrical boilers, but by applying mathematical principles to the flow of boiler water, quickly improved the flow of steam by adopting tapered boilers, which give their largest area to the point of highest steam production. Churchward then dispensed with the need for a large dome to collect steam, using instead top-feed of water supply from injectors, which together with top-fitted clack boxes hidden within a brass "bonnet" minimised boiler stress.

Churchward experimented with compounding, a principle development for marine engines which was widely adopted in European locomotive design. Although through his experimentation Churchward found little difference in operation in terms of the total power developed in compounding locomotives, the use of European locomotives in his trial led to his adoption of higher pressure boilers, and drive power split between two axles on four cylinder designs.

His third stream of philosophy was based around piston valves. Churchward's valves were 50% larger than anything seen in the UK to that time, travelled 50% further, and were designed to be concealed. The result gave the minimum loss of pressure as steam passed to the cylinders.

Churchward's resulting locomotive designs excluded trailing wheels, which maximised adhesion on the South Devon Banks. He was an early adopter in UK locomotive design of superheating, made efficient through the GWR's exclusive use of the high calorific-value steam coal from the South Wales Coalfield. He also adopted large bearing surfaces to reduce wear, something common in North America.

Churchward is credited with introducing to Britain several refinements from American and French steam locomotive practice. Among these were the tapered boiler and the casting of cylinders and saddles together, in halves. His choice of outside cylinders for express locomotives was also not standard in Britain for that time. Many elements of British practice were retained, of course. His locomotives for the most part used British plate frames, and the crew was accommodated in typical British fashion. The selection of a domeless boiler was more common to Britain than to the US.

=== 1901 outline scheme ===
In 1901 Churchward produced a scheme of six different locomotive types based on a few standard parts. All would have cylinders with 18 in (45.7 cm) diameter and 30 in (76.2 cm) stroke, piston valves of 8 1/2 in (21.6 cm) diameter, and all leading or trailing wheels would be 3 ft 3 in (99.1 cm) diameter. Locomotive classes corresponding to all these proposals were eventually built, with some differences in the dimensions.

Churchward's 1901 outline scheme
Wheel arrangement	Driving wheel diameter	Boiler barrel length	Connecting rod length	Corresponding class	Date of first engine	Engines as built
2-8-0	4 ft 7 1/2 in (141.0 cm)	15 ft (4.57 m)	10 ft 8 1/2 in (3.26 m)	2800 Class	1903	
4-6-0	5 ft 8 in (172.7 cm)	15 ft (4.57 m)	10 ft 8 1/2 in (3.26 m)	6800 Grange Class (by Collett)	1936	
4-6-0	6 ft 8 1/2 in (204.5 cm)	15 ft (4.57 m)	10 ft 8 1/2 in (3.26 m)	2900 Saint Class	1902	
2-6-2T	5 ft 8 in (172.7 cm)	11 ft 2 in (3.40 m)	6 ft 10 1/2 in (2.10 m)	5100 Class	1903	
4-4-2T	6 ft 8 1/2 in (204.5 cm)	11 ft 2 in (3.40 m)	6 ft 10 1/2 in (2.10 m)	2221 County Tank Class	1905	
4-4-0	6 ft 8 1/2 in (204.5 cm)	11 ft 2 in (3.40 m)	6 ft 10 1/2 in (2.10 m)	3800 County Class	1904	

=== Notable locomotives ===
==== GWR 4-4-0 3700 Class ====
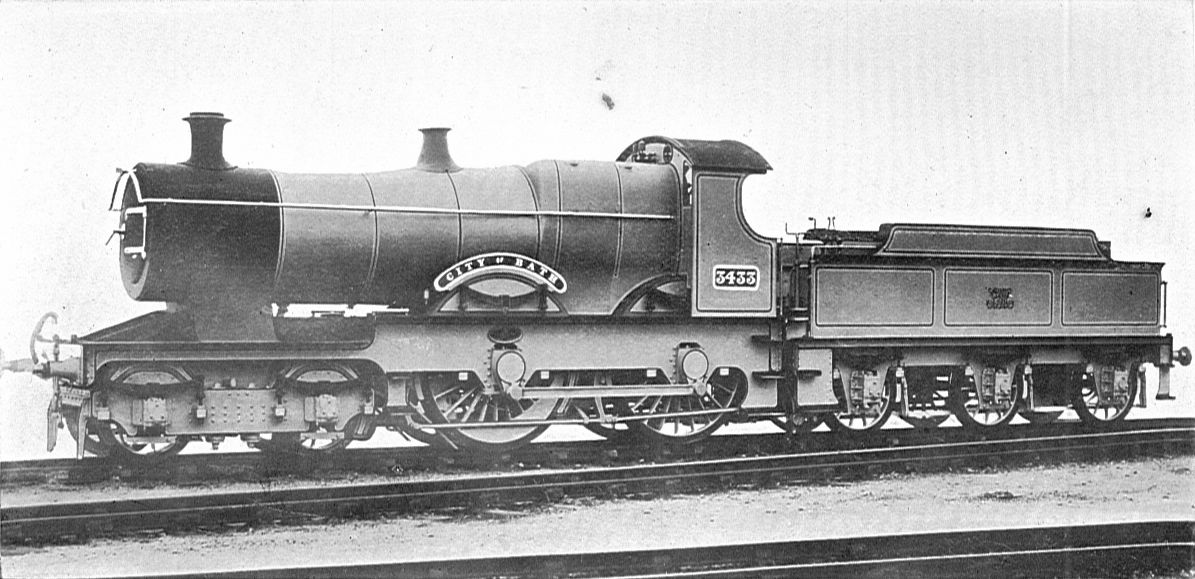
GWR 3700 Class No. 3433 City of Bath showing tapered boiler and Belpaire firebox

In September 1902 Churchward had a member of the Atbara Class, no. 3405 Mauritius, reboilered with a Belpaire firebox and the first use of a tapered boiler on the GWR. The boiler became the prototype for Churchward's GWR Standard No. 4 boiler. This experiment led to the design of the City class, with the first outshopped from Swindon in March 1903, No. 3433 City of Bath. It was fitted with the final form of the Standard No.4 boiler, with slightly curved sides and a tapered top to the firebox. The class soon became one of the most famous classes of locomotives in the world, when City of Truro became the first engine in the world to haul a train at 100 miles per hour in 1904 (although unauthenticated).

==== Experimental 4-6-0 locomotives ====
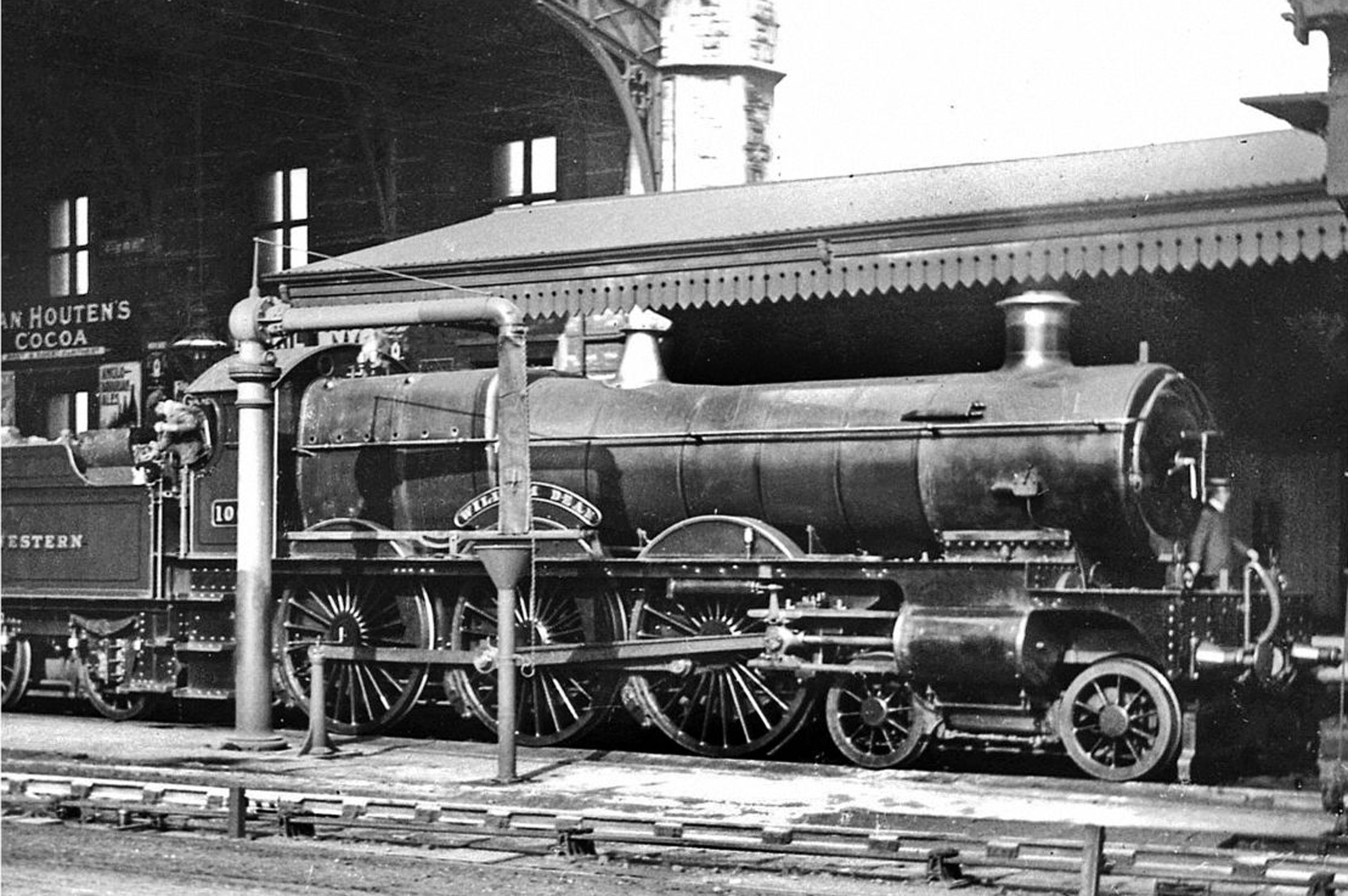
Experimental 4-6-0 No. 100 William Dean

In 1901, whilst still assistant to Dean, the GWR board approved Churchward's plan to build a series of two cylinder 4-6-0 locomotives.

No. 100 was out-shopped in February 1902, named Dean (later William Dean) in June 1902 to mark the latter's retirement. It incorporated a domeless parallel boiler, raised Belpaire firebox, 19 in (48.3 cm) diameter outside cylinders with 30 in (76.2 cm) piston stroke, and boiler pressure of 200 psi (1.38 MPa). The piston valves were driven by rocking levers actuated by the expansion link of Stephenson valve gear – this particular design was only used on no. 100.

No. 98 was out-shopped in March 1903, to a similar design but with a taper boiler, re-designed valve gear layout and cylinders, and a shorter wheelbase. Valve diameters were increased from 6 1/2 inches (170 mm) to 10 inches (250 mm).

No. 171 was out-shopped in December 1903, incorporating the improvements to No. 98 but with a 225 psi (1.55 MPa) boiler and minor amendments to the heating surface and grate area. Built as a 4-6-0, in October 1904 it was converted to a 4-4-2 to enable better comparison with the performance of the French de Glehn compound; it was reconverted to 4-6-0 in July 1907. Named Albion in 1904, it received a superheated boiler in 1910.

==== Experimental French locomotives ====
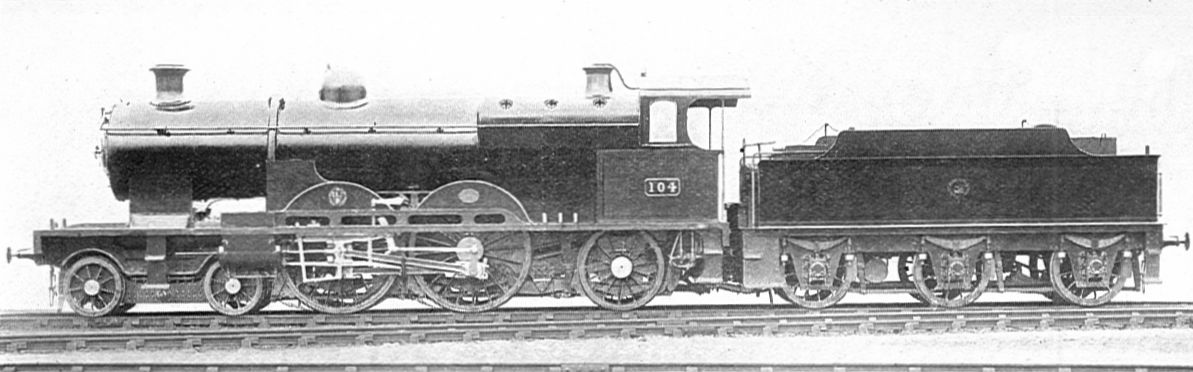
de Glehn 4-4-2 No. 104

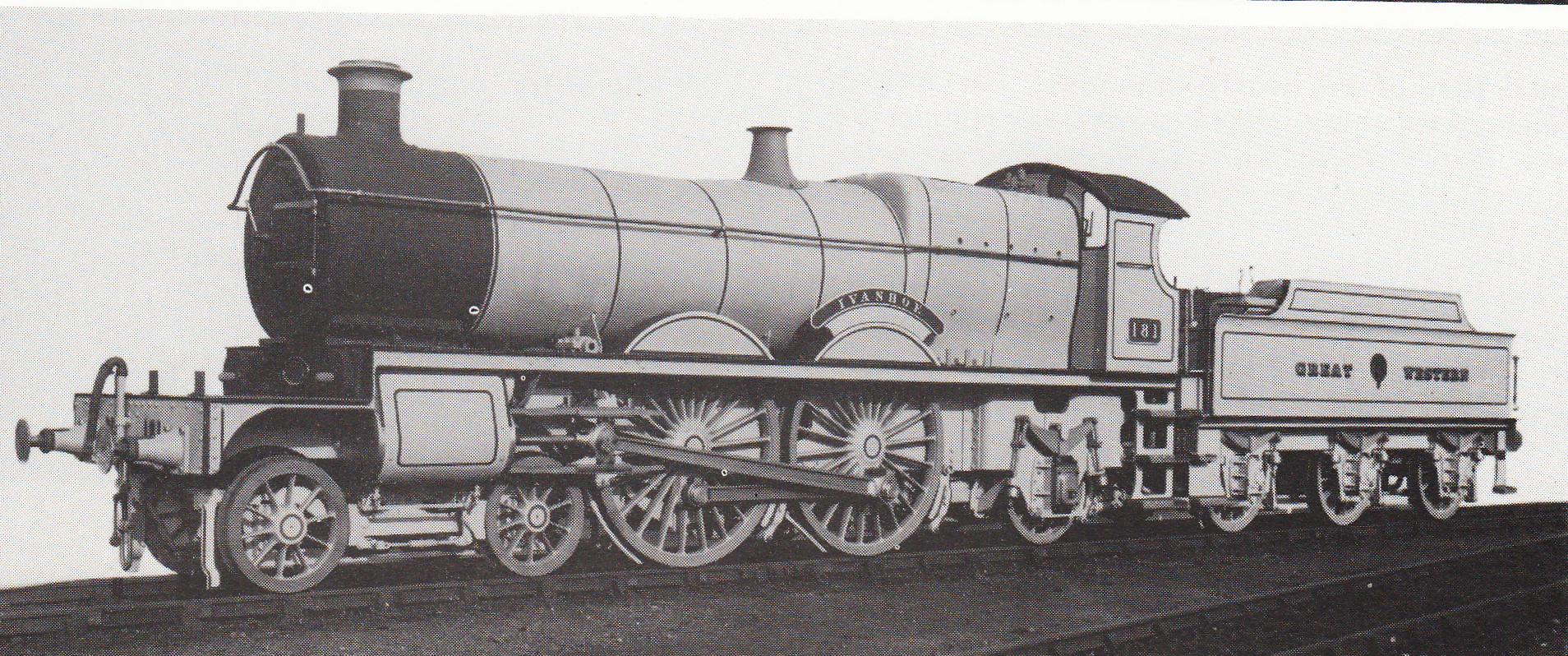
GWR Saint class No. 181 Ivanhoe running as 4-4-2 for comparison

On succeeding Dean, the GWR board authorised Churchward to purchase three French de Glehn-du Bousquet four-cylinder compound locomotives, in order to evaluate the benefits of compounding. Similar to the Paris-Orleans Railway's 3001 class and built by Société Alsacienne de Constructions Mécaniques, the first locomotive no.102 La France was delivered in 1903, with Nos. 103 and 104 purchased in 1905. The locomotives had two high pressure cylinders fitted between the frames, and two low pressure cylinders outside.

Each was initially fitted with a standard-pattern GWR chimney, a GWR tender and had their numbers positioned in GWR fashion on the sides of the cab. They were then each placed into service to evaluate performance, and then following engine crew feedback were modified to test other aspects of Churchward's design experimentation and philosophy. In 1926, the three locomotives were based at Oxford shed. In operational practice, compounding did not provide any significant improvement in either performance or economy compared to No 171 Albion, Churchward's prototype 4-6-0, which was converted to a 4-4-2 specifically for direct comparison with them. A further 13 engines in the Saint class were also originally built as 4-4-2s.

==== GWR 4-6-0 2900 Saint class ====
Experimental 4-6-0 No. 171 formed the basis of the GWR 2900 Saint Class. It appeared in four production series built between 1905 and 1913, each of which differed in dimensions. There were also differences between members of each series in terms of the boilers used, wheel arrangement (Churchward was unsure of the choice between 4-4-2 and 4-6-0), and arrangements for superheating.

The locomotives performed well as passenger locomotives over all the long-distance routes of the GWR and on all but the fastest express trains until they gradually became displaced to secondary services by the Castle Class in the late 1920s and 1930s. However, the 6 ft 8 1/2 in (2.045 m) driving wheels limited their usefulness on freight trains. Churchward had recognized this limitation by the introduction of his GWR 4700 Class 2-8-0 design with 5 ft 8 in (1.727 m) driving wheels in 1919, intended for express goods trains. However, Churchward's successor Charles Collett felt that a smaller-wheeled version of the 'Saint' class could form the basis of a successful mixed-traffic class of locomotives. He therefore rebuilt No. 2925 Saint Martin with 6 ft (1.829 m) driving wheels to become the prototype of his successful Hall Class locomotives. Thus the 2900 class became a template for later GWR 2-cylinder 4-6-0 classes including the Modified Hall, Grange, Manor and County classes, all of which were of the same basic design.

The class incorporated many revolutionary advances which were influential in British locomotive design for the next fifty years. According to The Great Western Society, 'Saint' class locomotives "represented one of the most important steps forward in railway traction of the 20th century", and they "are now acknowledged to have had a profound influence on almost every aspect of subsequent steam locomotive development".

==== Standard locomotive classes ====
The Saints and their derived classes were only part of Churchward's scheme. Based on a limited number of standard parts—including boilers, cylinders, wheels and valve gear—he planned a range of locomotives for duties such as express passenger, mixed traffic, heavy freight and suburban trains, with both tender and tank versions. He began to construct some of his designs immediately; he also extended the range of designs as the demands of the business required, producing the 4300 Moguls and 4700 express freight engines. His mixed-traffic design did not appear until Collett built the Granges in 1936.

==== GWR 4-6-0 4000 Class ====
The Great Western Railway 4000 or Star class were 4-cylinder 4-6-0 passenger locomotives introduced from early 1907. The prototype was built in May 1906 as a 4-4-2 Atlantic (but later converted to 4-6-0). The design benefited from experience gained from the 'Saint' class and the De Glehn engines. The locomotives proved to be very successful, handling the heaviest long-distance express trains, reaching top speeds of 90 mph (145 km/h), and they established the design principles for GWR 4-cylinder classes over the next twenty-five years.

==== The Great Bear Pacific ====
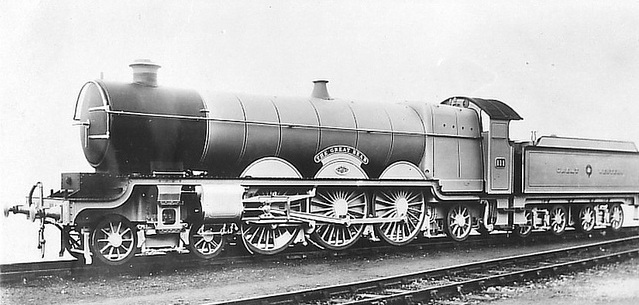
The Great Bear

GWR 111 The Great Bear was the first 4-6-2 (Pacific) locomotive used on a railway in Great Britain, the only one of that type ever built by the GWR, which is today seen as Churchward's notable failure in locomotive design. No clear GWR commercial reason existed for the design, so it is concluded by many as a further Churchward experiment, considered to explore what came beyond the Star Class when train loads increased beyond their capability. Basically a developed Star class locomotive, the larger boiler over trailing wheels allowed a firebox surface of 182 sq ft (16.9 m^{2}), a 17.5% increase in size compared to the Star Class. It was also built with a Swindon No. 1 superheater.

Due to its weight and 20 long tons 9 cwt (20.8 t) axle load, the locomotive was restricted to the Paddington to Bristol main line, mainly under Paddington driver Thomas Blackall, originally from Aston Tirrold, Oxfordshire. Despite later experimental developments, in service the performance of The Great Bear proved to be disappointing, and not a significant improvement on existing classes. The excellent performance of the Star Class and advent of the First World War brought a stop to further experimentation without significant improvement.

Although not a technical success, The Great Bear was considered the company's flagship locomotive from its introduction until Churchward's retirement in 1922. With the introduction of 4073 Caerphilly Castle in 1923 with a higher tractive effort, the locomotive ceased to have any publicity value and became an embarrassment. Due for heavy repairs in January 1924, it was withdrawn from service by Churchward's successor Charles Collett. It emerged from Swindon later that year as a 4-6-0 Castle Class, given the name Viscount Churchill.

=== Legacy ===
In 1922 Churchward retired, and C. B. Collett inherited his legacy of excellent, standardised designs. These designs influenced British locomotive practice to the end of steam. Major classes built by the LMS and even British Railways 50 years later are clearly developments of Churchward's basic designs. The LMS Stanier Class 5 4-6-0 and the BR standard class 5 are both derived from his Saint class early examples of which date to 1902.

BR Western Region class 47 locomotive no. D1664 (later 47079) was named George Jackson Churchward upon delivery in February 1965. It was renamed G. J. Churchward in March 1979, and the name was removed in October 1987.

== Death ==
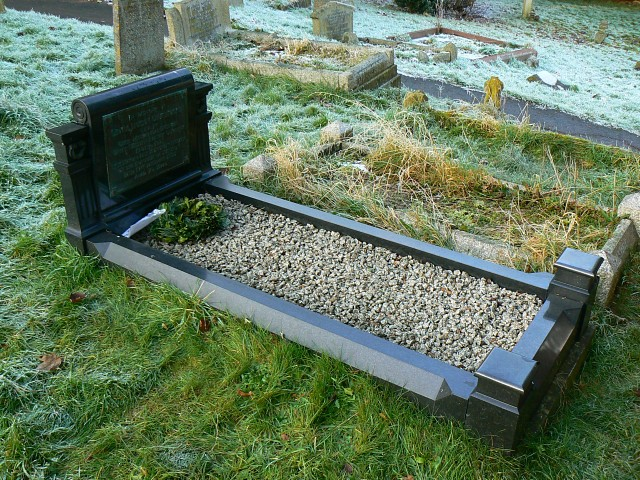
Churchward's grave, Christ Church, Swindon

Although Churchward had retired in 1922, he continued to live in a GWR-owned house near to the line at Swindon, and he retained his interest in the company's affairs. He never married. On 19 December 1933 he crossed the down through line and was struck and killed by a Paddington to Fishguard express, pulled by No. 4085 Berkeley Castle. The locomotive was a member of the GWR Castle class, designed by Charles Collett and derived from Churchward's own "Star" class.

In Churchward's will of 4 October 1933 he bequeathed various sums of money to his staff, including his gardener, housekeeper, maidservant, parlour maid, assistant gardeners and two friends. He awarded his chauffeur £4,000 along with 2 lathes with various tools and accessories including guns, motor cars and accessories, fishing rods and tackle and wearing apparel. The majority of his £60,000 plus estate was divided equally between his two sisters, Mary and Adelina. He is buried in the churchyard of Christ Church in Old Town, Swindon. His grave is marked by a polished black marble headstone with a kerb which was designated as a listed building in 1986.

The home ground of the football team in Churchward's birthplace of Stoke Gabriel, Stoke Gabriel A.F.C., is named the G.J. Churchward Memorial Ground in honour of his legacy.

Swindon also has a street named Churchward Avenue and a district called Churchward, both named after him.

== See also ==
- Locomotives of the Great Western Railway § George Jackson Churchward (1902–1922)

=== Churchward’s Locomotive Designs ===
- GWR 101 oil burning 0-4-0T
- GWR 111 The Great Bear 4-6-2
- GWR 1361 Class 0-6-0ST
- GWR 2221 County Tank Class 4-4-2T
- GWR 2800 Class 2-8-0
- GWR 2900 Saint Class 4-6-0
- GWR 3100 Class 2-6-2T
- GWR 3150 Class 2-6-2T
- GWR 3700 City Class 4-4-0
- GWR 3800 County Class 4-4-0
- GWR 4000 Star Class 4-6-0
- GWR 4200 Class 2-8-0T
- GWR 4300 Class 2-6-0
- GWR 4400 Class 2-6-2T
- GWR 4500 Class 2-6-2T
- GWR 4600 Class 4-4-2T
- GWR 4700 Class 2-8-0
- GWR steam rail motors
- GWR petrol-electric railcar

Business positions
Preceded by William Dean	Locomotive, Carriage and Wagon Superintendent of the Great Western Railway; 1902–1916	Succeeded by (post renamed)
Preceded by (post renamed)	Chief Mechanical Engineer of the Great Western Railway; 1916–1921	Succeeded by C. B. Collett
