= Grenville steam carriage =

Steam-powered road vehicle of 1875

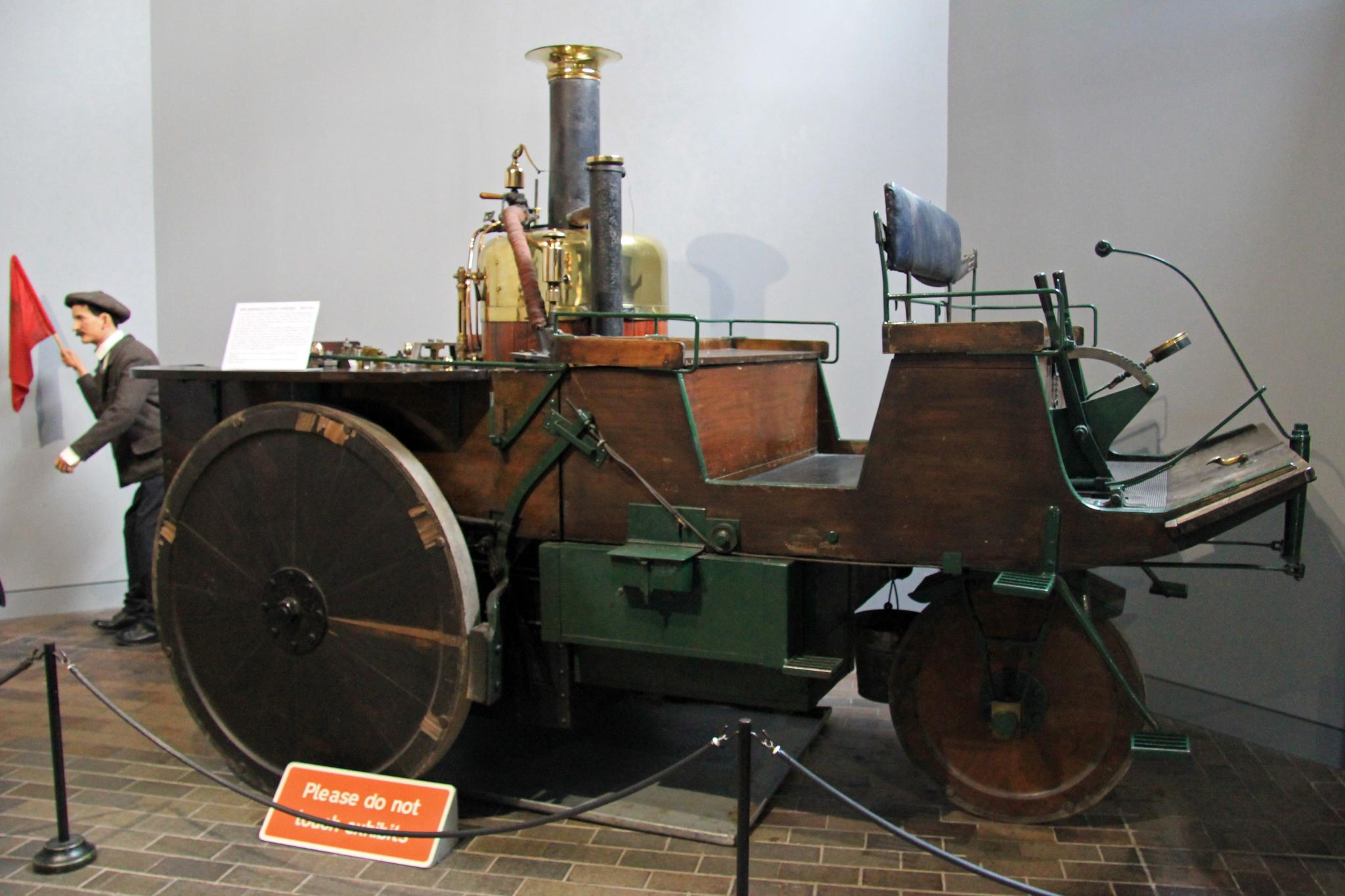
- The carriage preserved at the National Motor Museum, Beaulieu

Vehicle
- Length: 11 ft 6 in (3.51 m)
- Width: 5 ft 7 in (1.70 m)
- Height: 8 ft 3 in (2.51 m)
- Weight: 5,150 lb (2,340 kg)
- Capacity: Seven (two crew, five passengers)

Engine
- Fuel: Coal
- Boiler: Vertical
- Boiler pressure: 120 psi (830 kPa)
- Tubes: 50 x 1 in (25 mm) inclined tubes
- Engine: 2 cylinder simple expansion
- Valve gear: Stephenson link motion operating slide valves between the cylinders
- Bore: 5 in (130 mm)
- Stroke: 6 in (150 mm)

Heating Surface
- Total: 29 sq ft (2.7 m^{2})
- Firebox: 13 sq ft (1.2 m^{2})
- Tubes: 16 sq ft (1.5 m^{2})
- Grate Area: 2 1/2 sq ft (0.23 m^{2})

Water Capacity
- Boiler: 35 imp gal (160 L)
- Water Tank: 50 imp gal (230 L)

The Grenville steam carriage was developed in 1875 by Robert Neville-Grenville, assisted by George Jackson Churchward. It was built around a boiler from a Merryweather & Sons fire engine, and could carry seven people including the driver, steersman and stoker.

The carriage is preserved at the National Motor Museum, Beaulieu, and is thought to be the oldest self-propelled passenger-carrying vehicle still in working order.

== Design ==
Neville-Grenville, the eldest son of Ralph Neville-Grenville, of Butleigh Court, Butleigh, Glastonbury, is said to have received the first engineering degree from Cambridge University. He gathered several steam tractors, ploughs and other engines to work on the family estate. He and Churchward met as apprentices at the South Devon Railway's works at Newton Abbot.

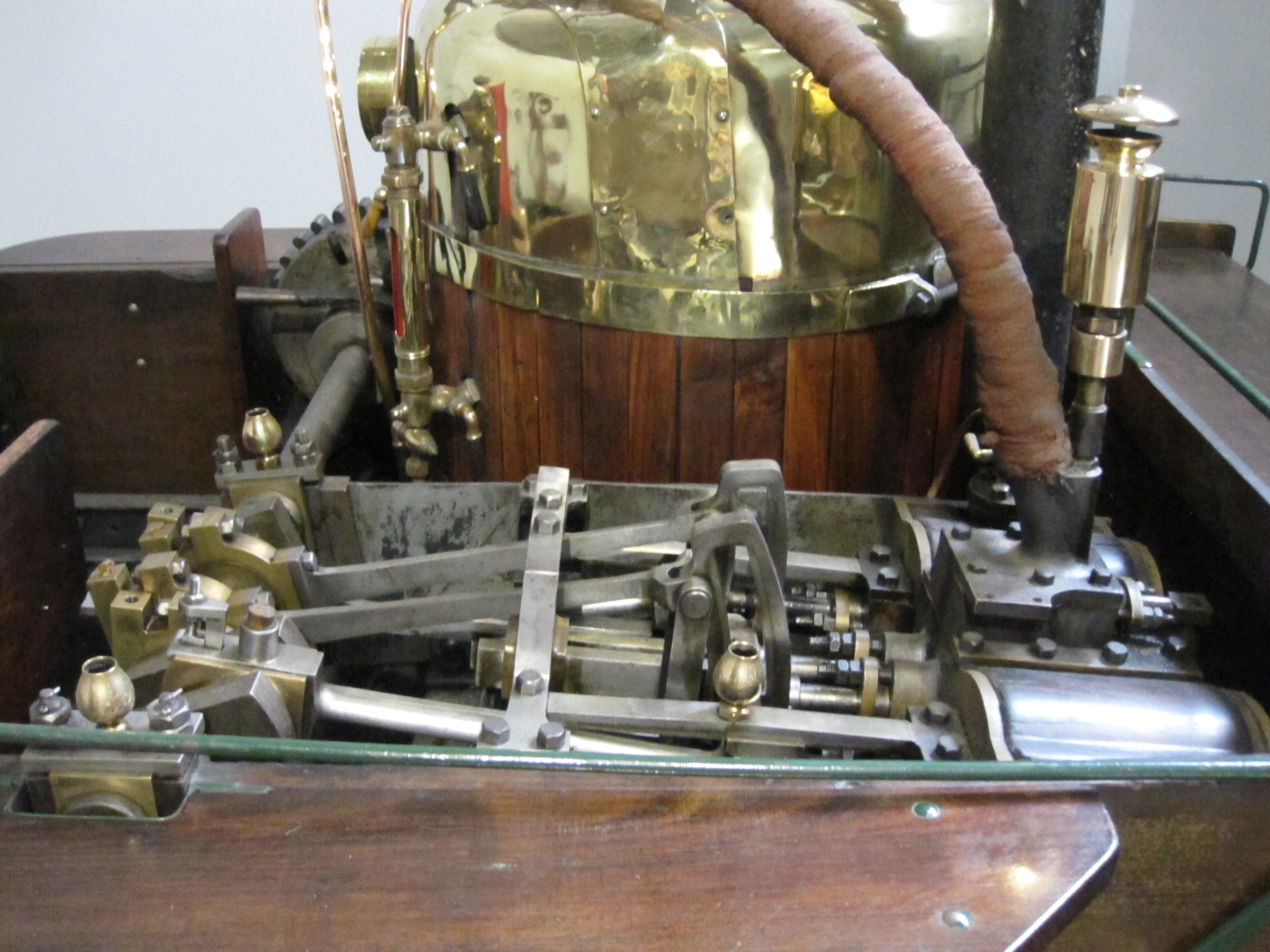
Two-cylinder engine beside boiler

From 1874, in a collaboration that lasted fifteen years, they designed and built a steam-powered, passenger carrying road vehicle. Built on a 4 in × 2 in (102 mm × 51 mm) steel girder, it had a single steering wheel turned by a tiller at the front, and two wheels on the driven axle at the rear. The three wheels were each built up from 16 teak segments held together by an iron tyre, a design known as a Mansell wheel. Two parallel seats carry six passengers, including the driver, though the brakes may be operated by a separate brakesman on the driver's right. A fireman sits at the rear, stoking the fire and maintaining the water level in the boiler. The boiler itself was taken from a Merryweather fire engine, (Note: Prior to 1899, fire engines were horse-drawn; the steam engine was used only to pump the water.) and supplies the twin cylinders (which replaced the original single-cylinder design).

== Operation ==
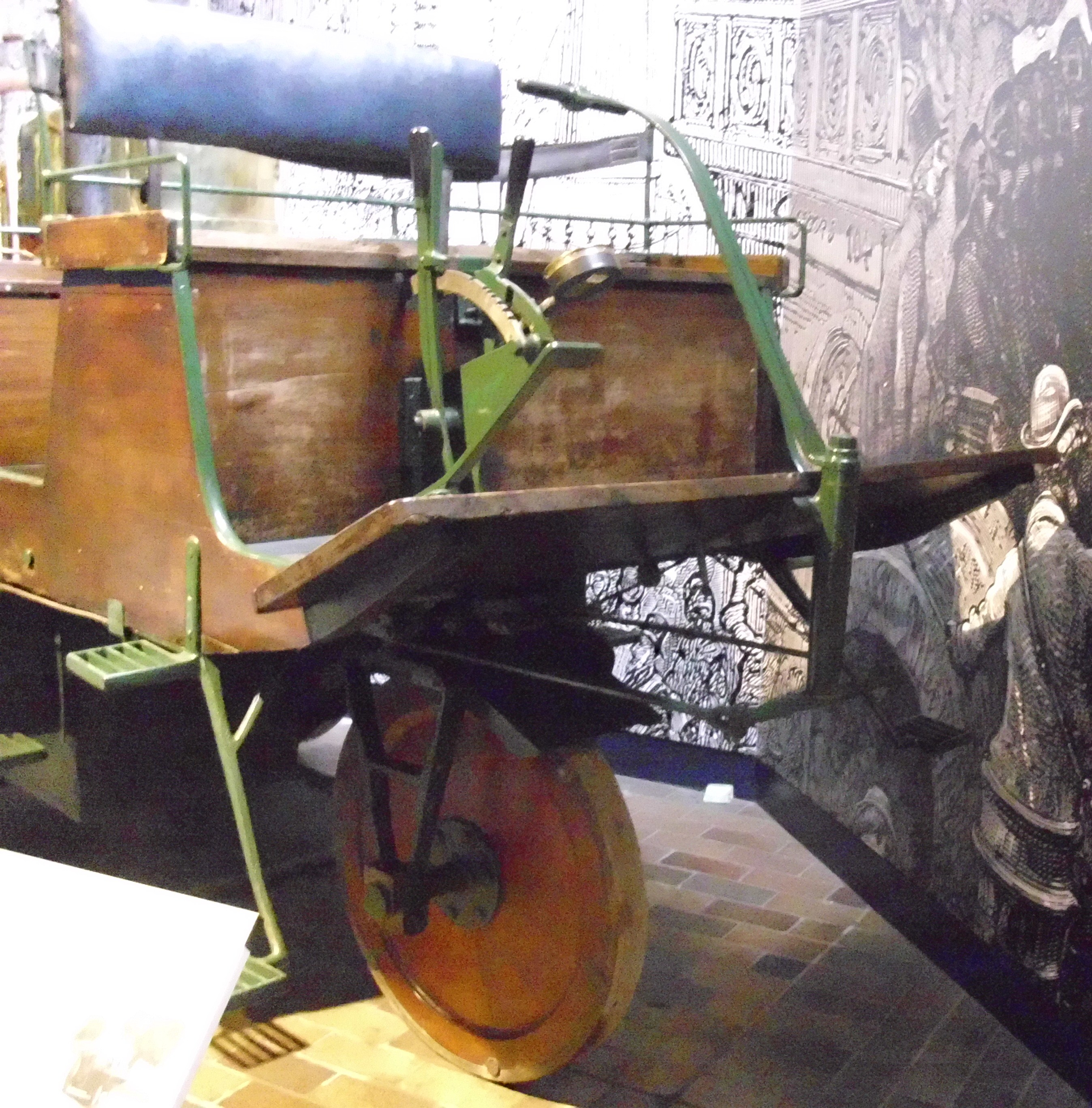
Driving seat and controls

Once steam is raised, the driver steers and controls the reverse/cut-off lever from the front seat. Brakes are applied through a foot pedal. For steeper roads, a dog clutch can engage an epicyclic reduction gear with a 2:1 ratio. The fireman can top-up the boiler using a feed pump driven by an intermediate shaft, or an injector when the vehicle is stationary. On a level road, it can reach almost 20 mph (32 km/h), and consumes 4–5 imp gal (18–23 L) of water and 5–6 lb (2.3–2.7 kg) of coal per mile.

== Use and preservation ==
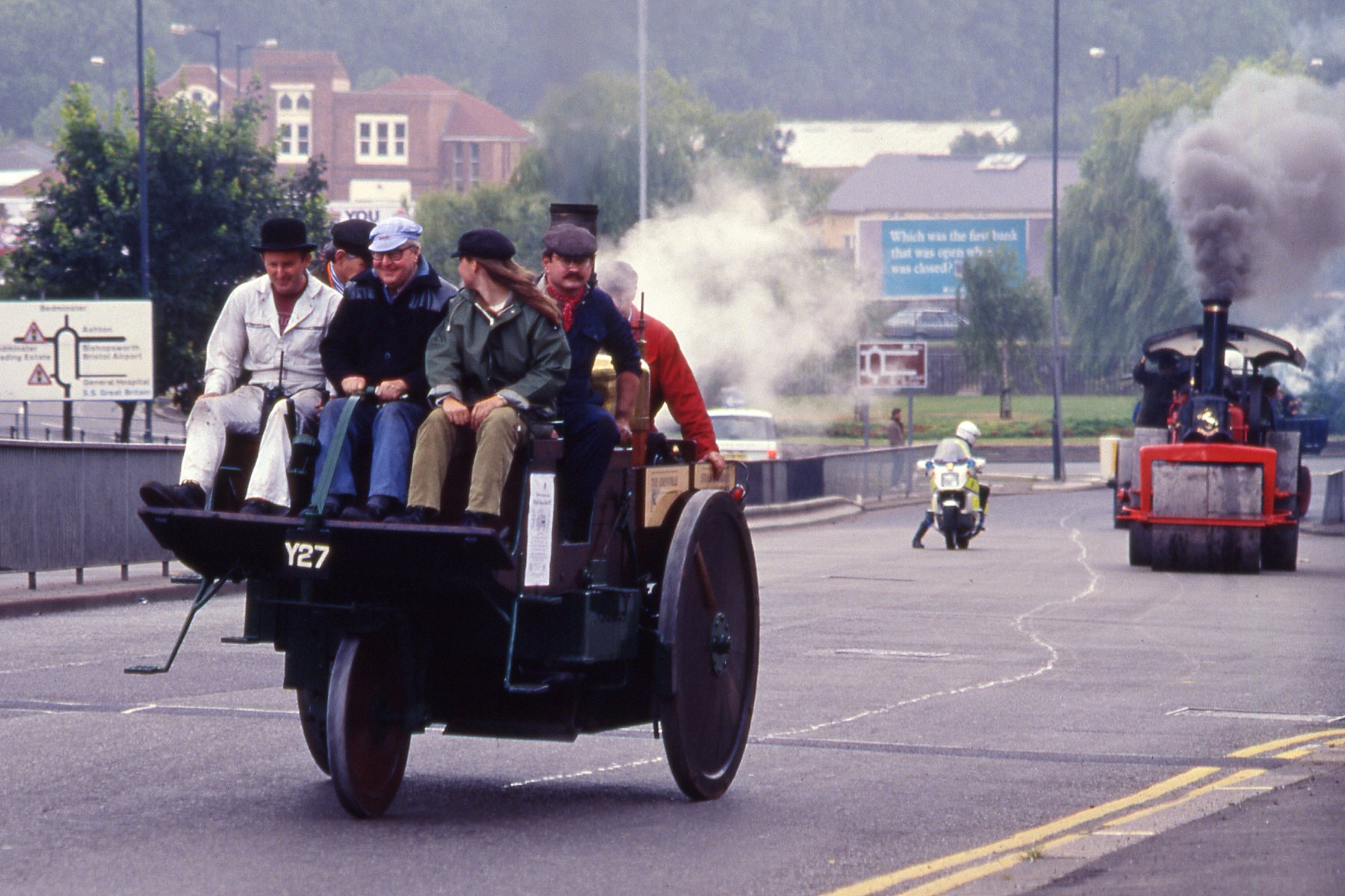
In steam in 1993

The carriage was used around the Glastonbury area for about twenty years, until in 1898 it was converted to a stationary engine to power a cider-press. In the late 1930s it was restored to working order by John Allen & Sons. An account of this restoration is given by George Allen.

In 1946 it was chosen to lead the Society of Motor Manufacturers and Traders' London Cavalcade in celebration of the British Motor Industry's fifty-year Jubilee. It was driven by Captain Allen, while its stoker "[could not] read or write...; he had never before been out of his native Sussex."

It was gifted to Bristol City Museum in 1947 by Captain Philip L. Neville, the builder's nephew, where, after years on static display, it was again restored to working order. Paul Elkin the driver, and his stoker Fred Lester, managed to get the vehicle to pass the MOT test, so that it could take part in the 1977 Bristol Lord Mayor’s Jubilee Procession. After this, however, the 1938 replacement boiler from Shand Mason & Co was found to be under the original specification, so it was taken off the road and Jefferies of Avonmouth tasked with repairing it.

It was running again in 2000, in which year it was the oldest entrant to the London to Brighton Veteran Car Run, completing it in about nine hours. In 2009 it was loaned to the National Motor Museum, Beaulieu, where it is thought to be the oldest self-propelled passenger vehicle that remains in working order.

== See also ==
- Steam car
- List of steam car makers
- History of steam road vehicles

== Notes and references ==
=== Sources ===
- Allen, G. W. G. (October 1941). "The Grenville Steam Carriage of 1875". Meccano Magazine. XXVI (10): 316–317.
- "BIAS JOURNAL No 10 1977 - THE GRENVILLE STEAM CARRIAGE" (PDF). Bristol Industrial Archaeological Society (BIAS).
- "Butleigh People N". Butleigh.
- Griffiths, Denis (1987). Locomotive engineers of the GWR. Wellingborough: Stephens. ISBN 0-85059-819-2.
- "London to Brighton Veteran Car Run - The General Items Page". The Veteran Car Club of Great Britain.
- "Grenville Steam Carriage". The National Motor Museum Trust.
- "The British Motor Industry's Jubilee". Motor Sport Magazine. XXII (9): 205. September 1946.
- "Searching for Surname=GRENVILLE; Forename=robert". A Cambridge Alumni Database.
- "From Somerset it came". The Western Group of Motoring Writers.
- Graham, Chris (9 August 2020). "Merryweather Fire Engines". Heritage Machines.
