= GWR 2900 Class =

Class of GWR steam locomotive

Great Western Railway 2900 Saint class
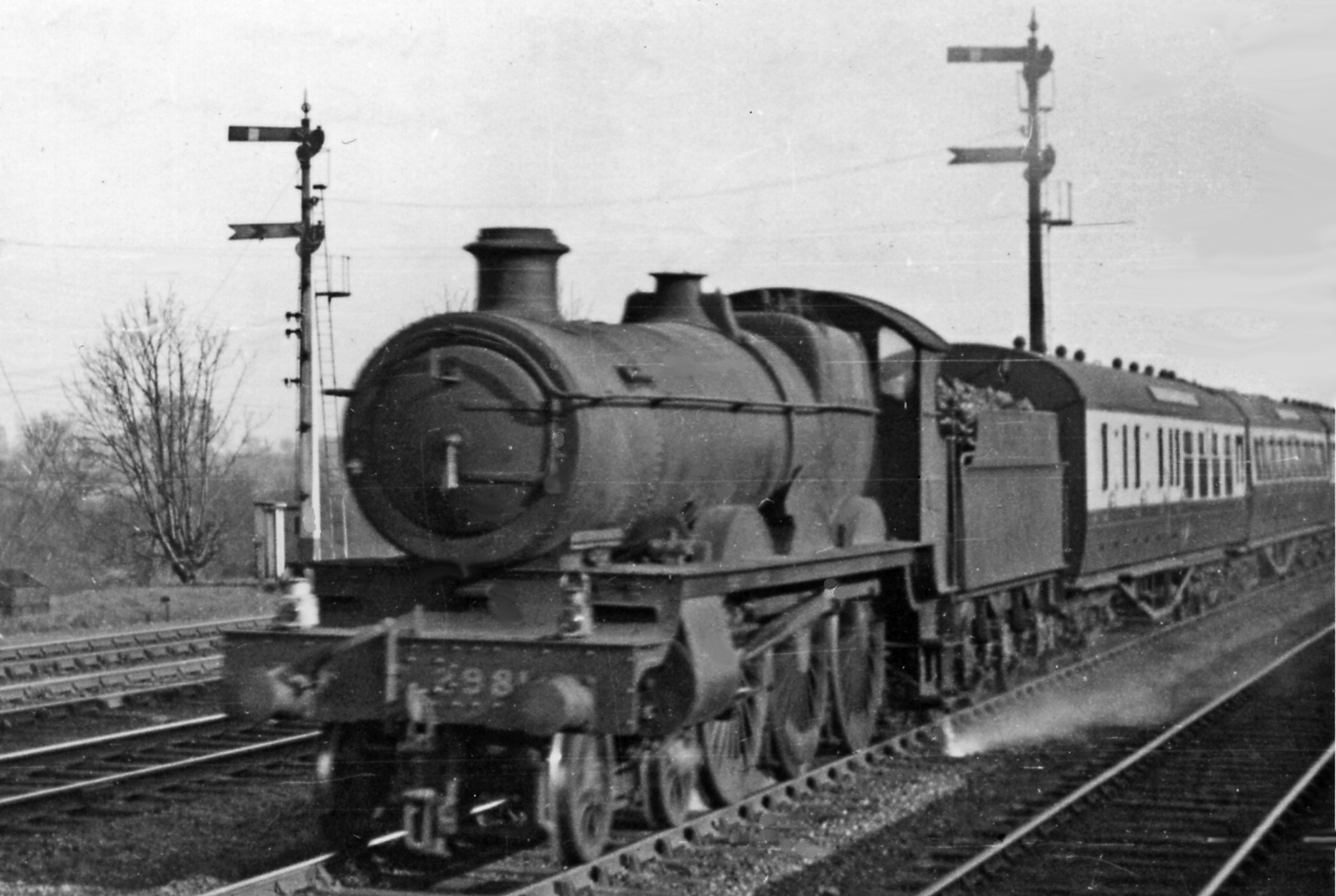
- 2981 Ivanhoe at Tilehurst in 1948
Type and origin
- Power type: Steam
- Designer: George Jackson Churchward
- Builder: GWR Swindon Works
- Build date: 1902-1913, 2019
- Total produced: 77
Specifications
- Configuration
  - Whyte: 4-6-0 (thirteen examples were built as 4-4-2 but rebuilt to 4-6-0 1912/13).
  - UIC: 2'Ch2
- Gauge: 4 ft 8 1/2 in (1,435 mm) standard gauge
- Leading dia.: 3 ft 2 in (0.965 m)
- Driver dia.: 6 ft 8 1/2 in (2.045 m)
- Trailing dia.: 4 ft 1 1/2 in (1.257 m) (4-4-2 only)
- Wheelbase: loco: 27 ft 1 in (8.26 m) – 27 ft 7 in (8.41 m) loco & tender: 53 ft 4 3/4 in (16.28 m) – 53 ft 10 3/4 in (16.43 m)
- Length: 63 ft 0 1/4 in (19.21 m)
- Width: 8 ft 11 in (2.718 m)
- Height: 13 ft 3 1/2 in (4.051 m)
- Axle load: 18 long tons (18 t; 20 short tons)
- Loco weight: 68.30 long tons (69.40 t; 76.50 short tons)
- Tender weight: 43.15 long tons (43.84 t; 48.33 short tons)
- Fuel capacity: 5 long tons (5.1 t; 5.6 short tons)
- Water cap.: 3,500 imp gal (16,000 L; 4,200 US gal) – 4,000 imp gal (18,000 L; 4,800 US gal)
- Firebox
  - Grate area: 27.22 sq ft (2.529 m^{2})
- Boiler: GWR Standard No. 1 (with variations)
- Boiler pressure: 225 psi (1.55 MPa) (production series)
- Heating surface
  - Firebox: 154.94 sq ft (14.394 m^{2})
  - Tubes and flues: 1,485.96 sq ft (138.050 m^{2})
- Superheater
  - Type: "Swindon No. 3"
  - Heating area: 307.52 sq ft (28.570 m^{2})
- Cylinders: Two, outside
- Cylinder size: 18 in × 30 in (457 mm × 762 mm) or 18 1/2 in × 30 in (470 mm × 762 mm)
- Valve gear: Stephenson
- Valve type: 10 inches (254 mm) piston valves (2935 rebuilt with poppet valves)
Performance figures
- Tractive effort: 20,530 lbf (91.32 kN) – 24,395 lbf (108.51 kN)
Career
- Operators: Great Western Railway; British Railways
- Class: 2900 or Saint
- Power class: GWR: C BR: 4P
- Number in class: 76
- Numbers: 2900–2955, 2971-2990, 2998
- Axle load class: GWR: Red
- Retired: 1924, 1931–1953
- Disposition: One rebuilt as Hall class (2925/4900 Saint Martin), remainder scrapped; One 4900 example has been backdated to 29XX specification

The Great Western Railway 2900 Class or Saint Class was built by the Great Western Railway's Swindon Works. The class incorporated several series of 2-cylinder steam locomotives designed by George Jackson Churchward and built between 1902 and 1913 with differences in dimensions for comparative purposes. The majority of these were built as 4-6-0 locomotives; but thirteen examples were built as 4-4-2 locomotives and later converted to 4-6-0 during 1912/13. They proved to be a highly successful class which established the design principles for GWR 2-cylinder classes over the next fifty years, and influenced similar classes on other British railways.

== Background ==
After finally converting the last broad gauge lines in 1892, the Great Western Railway (GWR) began a period of modernisation as new cut-off lines shortened its routes to west of England, South Wales and Birmingham. During the first decade of the twentieth century the Chief Mechanical Engineer, George Jackson Churchward, designed or acquired a number of experimental locomotives with different wheel arrangements and boiler designs to help him plan for the future motive power needs of the railway. The first of these was a two-cylinder 4-6-0 locomotive, designed in 1901 whilst Churchward was still the Chief Assistant of his predecessor William Dean.

== Prototypes ==
Between 1902 and 1905 Churchward built and tested three prototype locomotives with detail differences, before using the third as the basis for the production series.

=== No. 100 ===
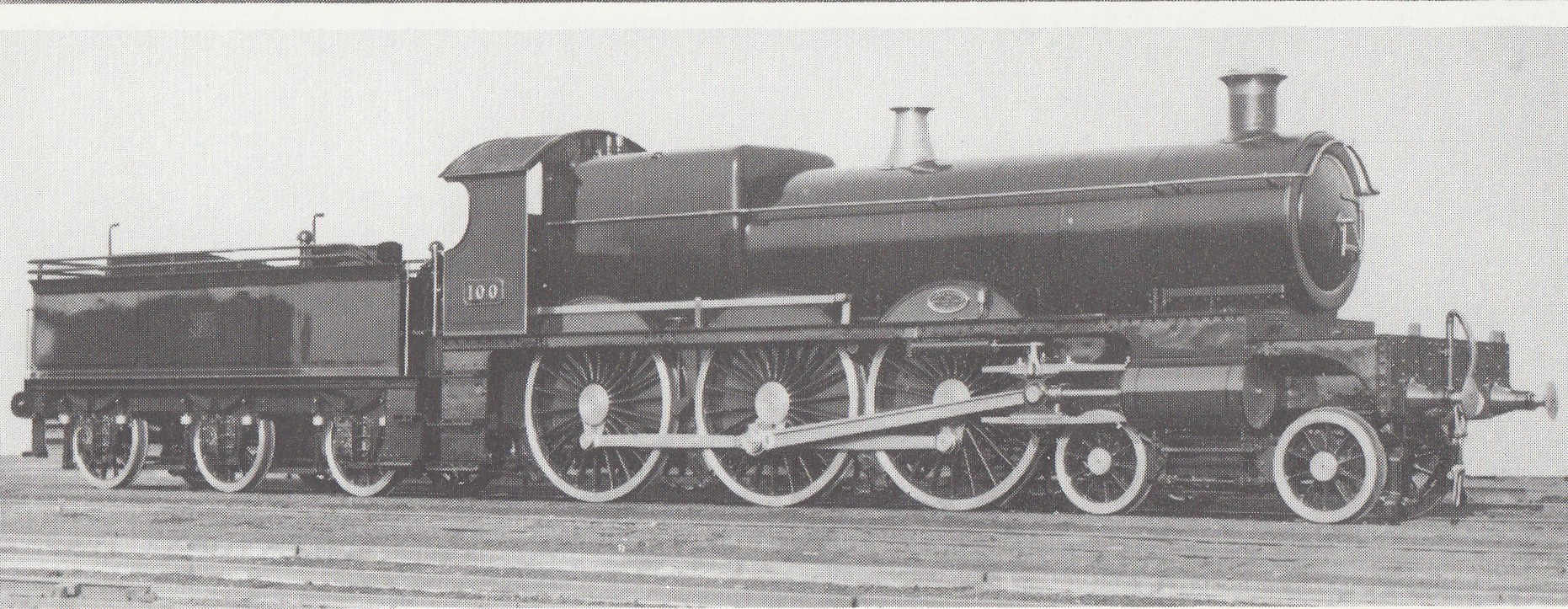
No. 100 as built in 1902

The first prototype was completed at the Swindon Works of the GWR (Lot 132) in February 1902. It was numbered 100 and in June 1902 was named Dean (later William Dean) to mark the latter's retirement. The new design incorporated all of Churchward's current ideas including a domeless parallel boiler, raised Belpaire firebox, 19 in (48.3 cm) diameter outside cylinders with 30 in (76.2 cm) piston stroke, and boiler pressure of 200 psi (1.38 MPa). The piston valves were driven by rocking levers actuated by the expansion link of Stephenson valve gear – this particular design was only used on No. 100. The parallel boiler was later replaced with a taper boiler, and then the first superheated taper boiler in 1910.

Churchward had studied American boiler design, but he was also later influenced by continental practice in efficient motion design. A de Glehn 4-4-2 compound engine was ordered from the Société Alsacienne de Constructions Mécaniques (SACM) for comparative trials on the GWR. According to E.C. Poultney, No. 100 was the first 4-6-0 locomotive to have high enough boiler capacity and steam ports large enough to handle the steam flow required by large cylinders: "The engine probably influenced to a large extent the use made of engines of the 4-6-0 type". No.100 was renumbered 2900 in 1912, and was withdrawn from service in 1932.

=== No. 98 ===
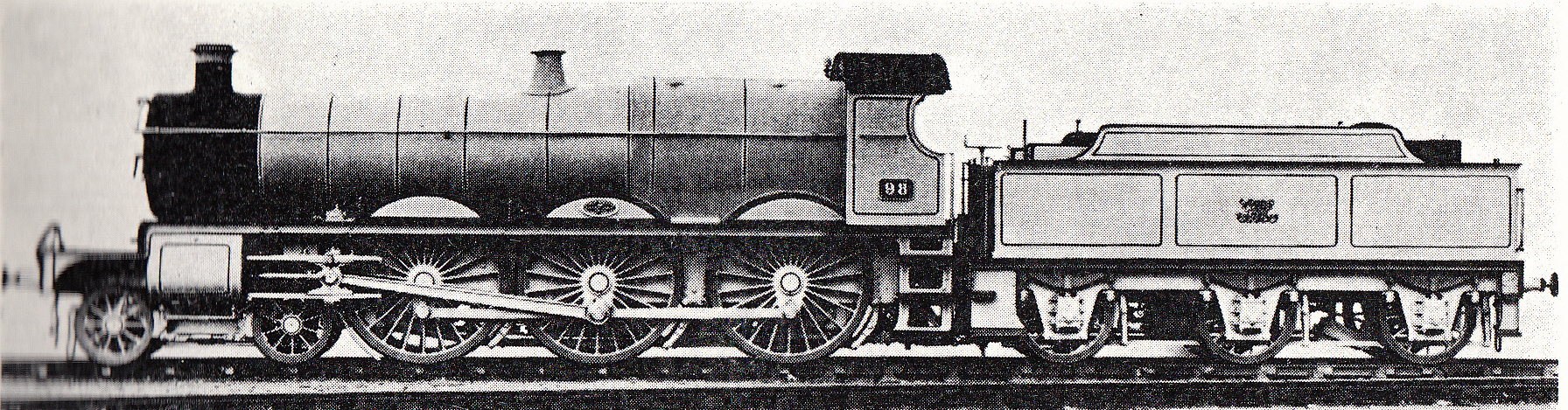
The second prototype No. 98 as built 1903

A second prototype locomotive, No. 98, was built at Swindon Works in March 1903 (Lot 138) to a similar design but with a taper boiler, re-designed valve gear layout and cylinders and a shorter wheelbase. Valve diameters were increased from 6 1/2 inches (170 mm) to 10 inches (250 mm). According to Poultney, these improvements "may truly be said to be the keystone of the arch upon which all modern locomotives are designed". In 1906 this locomotive was re-boilered with a 225 psi (1.55 MPa) boiler to correspond with the third prototype. This prototype locomotive was named Vanguard in 1907 (renamed Ernest Cunard in the same year). It was renumbered 2998 in 1912, received a superheated boiler in 1911 and was withdrawn in 1933.

=== No. 171 ===
A third prototype, No. 171, was built at Swindon in December 1903 (Lot 145) incorporating the improvements to No. 98 but with a 225 psi (1.55 MPa) boiler and minor amendments to the heating surface and grate area. It was built as a 4-6-0 but in October 1904 it was converted to a 4-4-2 to enable better comparison with the performance of the French built de Glehn 4-4-2 Compound; it was reconverted to 4-6-0 in July 1907. The conversion was carried out by substituting 4 ft 1 1/2 in (1.257 m) trailing wheels with outside suspension for the final set of driving wheels. It was named Albion in 1904, renumbered 2971 in 1912, received a superheated boiler in 1910 and was withdrawn in 1946. No. 171 formed the basis of the main production series, introduced in 1905, although at this time Churchward was still unsure of the relative merits of the 4-4-2 and 4-6-0 wheel arrangements.

== Production series ==
The Saint class appeared in four production series built between 1905 and 1913, each of which differed in dimensions. There were also differences between members of each series in terms of the boilers used, wheel arrangement, and arrangements for superheating. Different series and individual locomotives within series were also fitted with different tenders ranging from 3,500 imp gal (16,000 L; 4,200 US gal) to 4,000 imp gal (18,000 L; 4,800 US gal) capacity.

=== Scott series ===
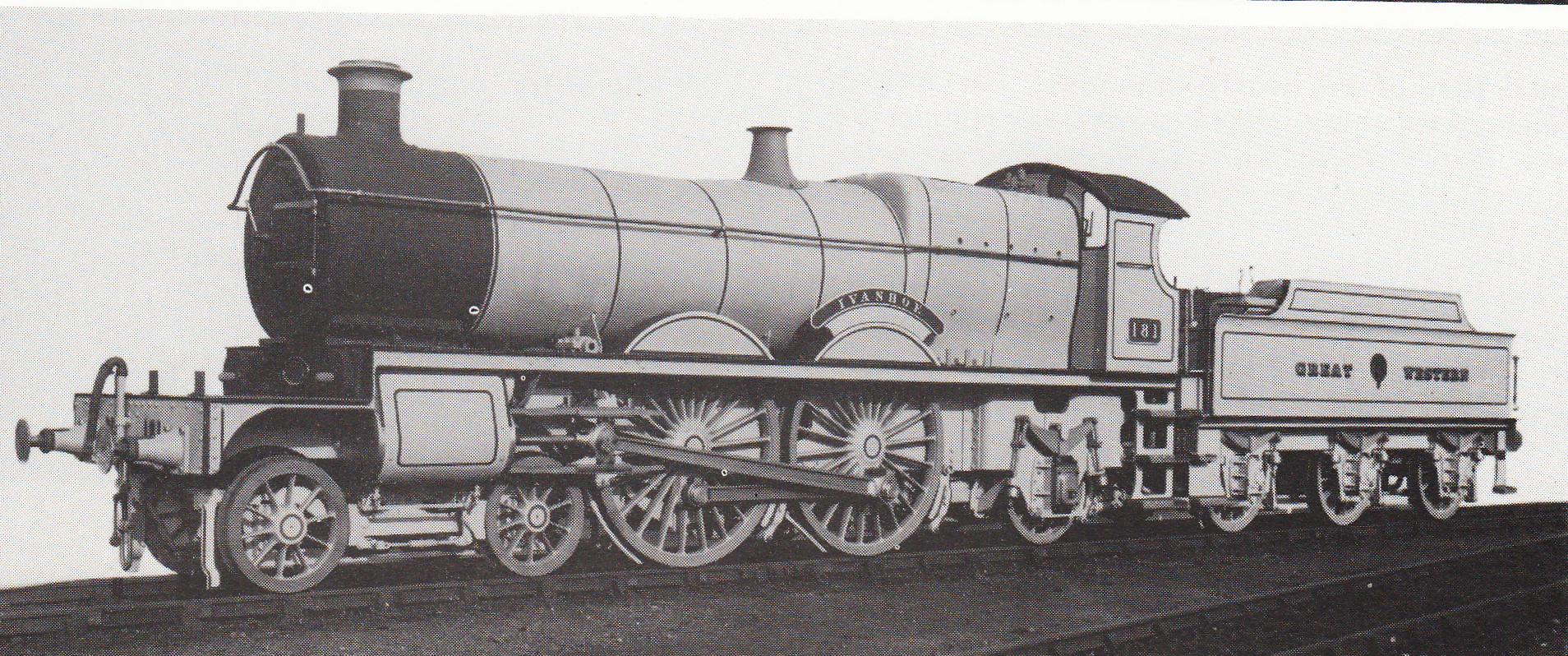
First series No. 181 Ivanhoe as built as a 4-4-2

Whilst 171 was undergoing trials in 1905 nine further locomotives were ordered to be built at Swindon Works to a similar design (Lot 154) followed by a further ten (Lot 158), totalling 19 locomotives in this series. Thirteen of these were built as 4-4-2s and six as 4-6-0s. However, by January 1913, Churchward was persuaded by the superior adhesion provided by a 4-6-0 and they had all been converted to this wheel arrangement. The new locomotives were numbered 172–190 (renumbered 2972–2990 in 1912). Twelve of the series were named after characters in the novels of Sir Walter Scott. Directors of the GWR accounted for most of the other names. The series was withdrawn between 1931 and 1951.

=== Ladies ===
A second series of ten similar locomotives appeared in May 1906 (Swindon Lot 164), numbered 2901–10 and named after historical, mythological or poetical 'Ladies'. Nos. 2904–6 had short tapered boilers and short smokeboxes, whereas Nos. 2902–03 and 2907–10 had longer versions. All except 2901 had 18.125 in × 30 in (460 mm × 762 mm) cylinders, giving a tractive effort of 23,382 lbf (104.01 kN). No. 2901 Lady Superior was the first British locomotive to be built with a modern Schmidt superheater. The remainder of the locomotives were fitted with Swindon No.3 superheaters between 1909 and 1911 and were withdrawn between 1933 and 1952.

In May 1906 Charles Collett, then assistant manager of Swindon Works, supervised a demonstration run of number 2903 Lady of Lyons, newly released from the erecting shop. By mile-post timings observed from the engine and from passing times recorded at Little Somerford and Hullavington signal boxes, 4 1/2 miles apart and with a descending gradient of 1 in 300 between them, a speed of approximately 120 miles per hour (190 km/h) was recorded, but this is not reliable enough to be considered a record.

=== Saints ===
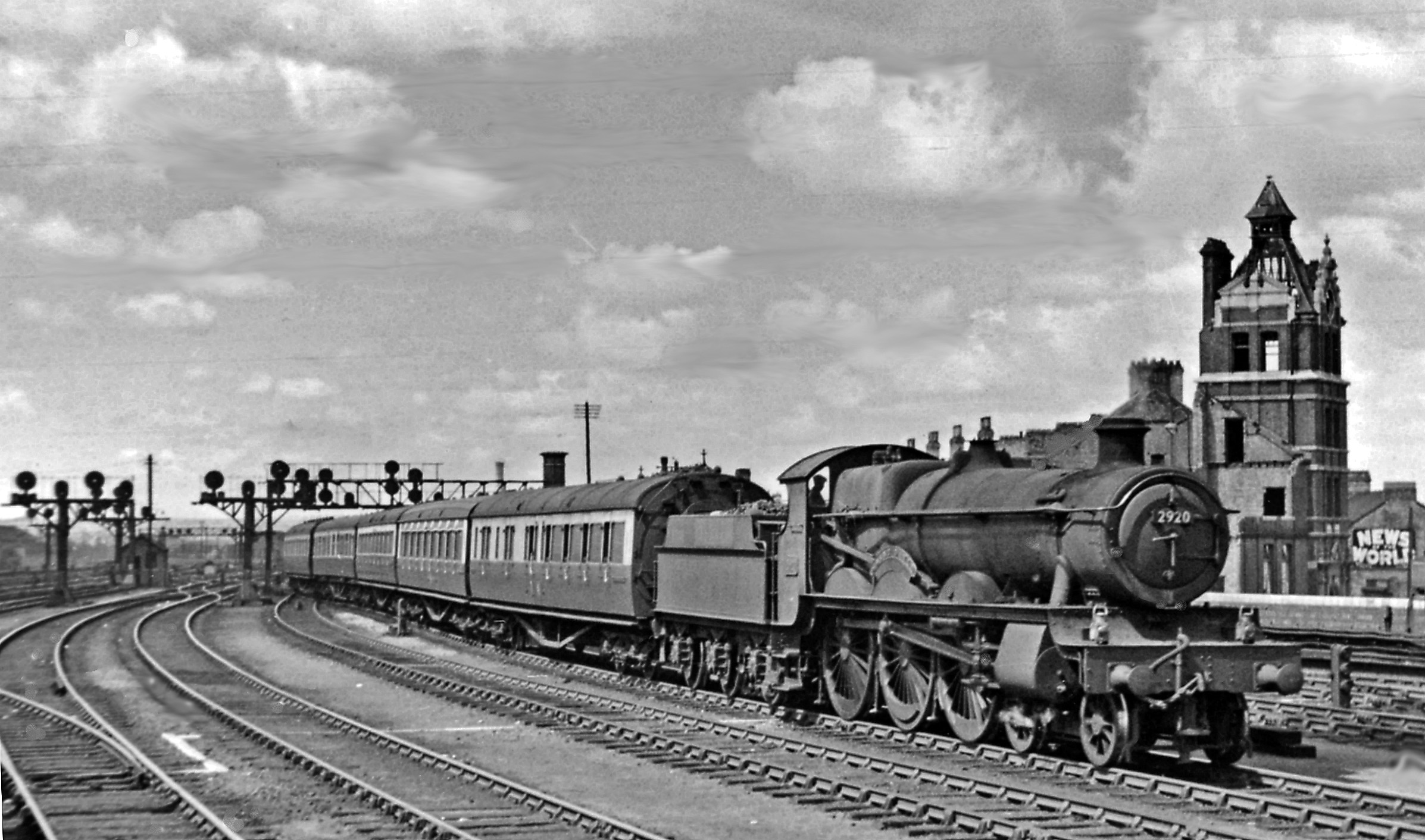
No. 2920 Saint David; from the third production series, built 1907, at Cardiff Central departing east towards Birmingham, 1953

A third series of twenty further locomotives appeared during August and September 1907 (Swindon Lot 170), numbered 2911–30 and named after Saints. The framing for these had long curved ends under the cab and over the cylinders, which greatly improved the rather angular appearance of the earlier locomotives. They were fitted with cone boilers and smokeboxes. In October 1908, No. 2922 Saint Gabriel was fitted with a Swindon No. 2 superheater. The following year the Swindon No. 3 superheater became standard for the class. Between 1909 and 1912 the remainder of the locomotives were fitted with the Swindon No. 3 superheater. The Saints were withdrawn between 1932 and 1951. No. 2925 Saint Martin was rebuilt with smaller wheels in December 1924 to become the prototype Collett 4900 and renumbered 4900 but still carrying the same name.

=== Courts ===
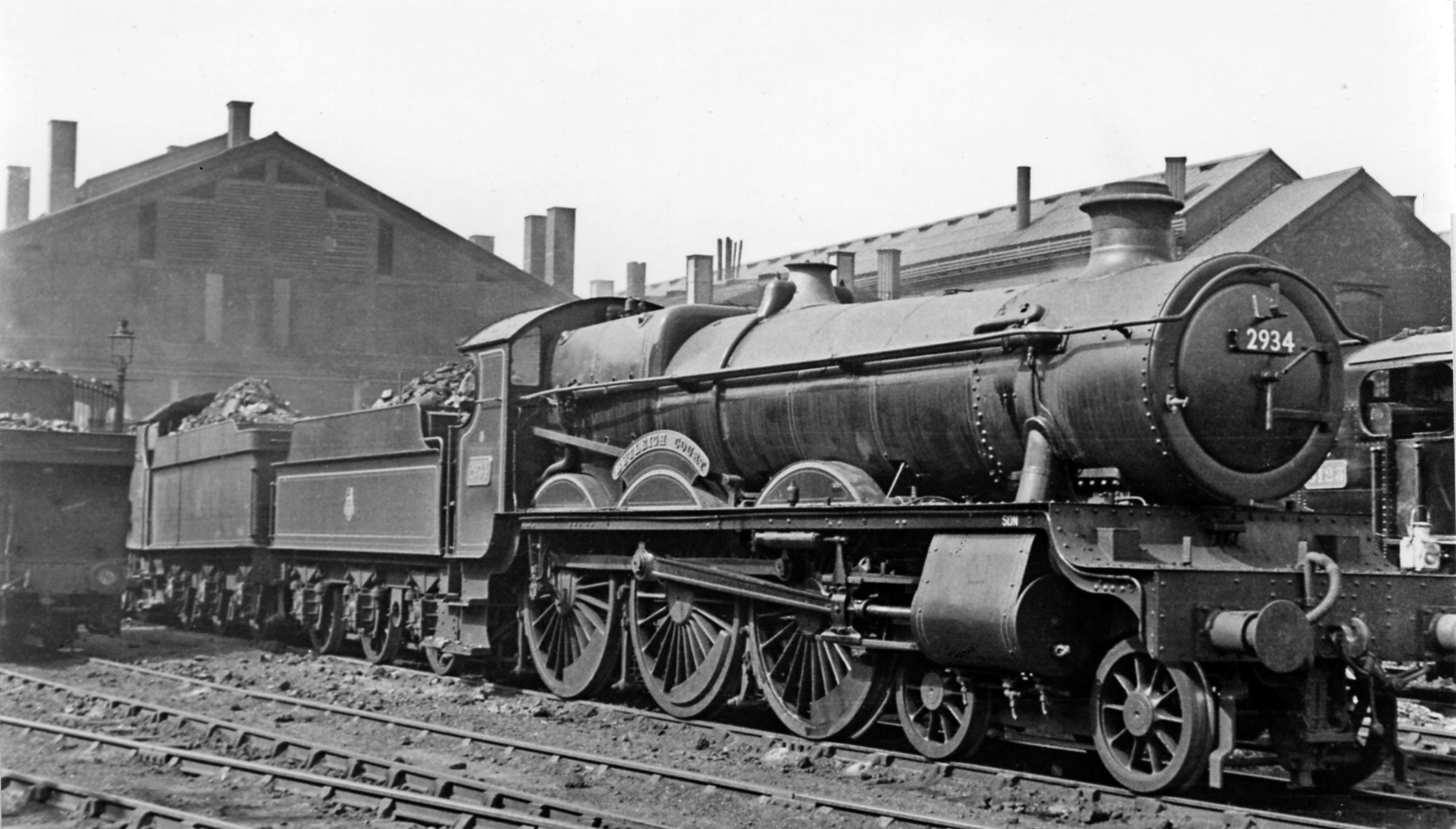
2934 Butleigh Court from the fourth production series at Swindon Locomotive Depot in 1950

A fourth series of 25 locomotives appeared during the years 1911 to 1913 (Swindon Lots 185, 189 and 192). These were numbered 2931–55 and named after famous Courts (i.e. mansions). They were all built with superheaters and there were detailed differences between the boilers used on different lots. They were all withdrawn between 1948 and 1953.

Table of orders and numbers
Year	Quantity	Lot No.	Works Nos.	Locos Nos. (pre-1912)	Loco Nos. (post-1912)	Notes
1902	1	132	1928	100	2900	
1903	1	138	1990	98	2998	
1903	1	145	2024	171	2971	
1905	9	154	2106–2114	172–180	2972–2980	Scott-series
1905	10	158	2128–2137	181–190	2981–2990	Scott-series
1906	10	164	2199–2208	2901–2910	2901–2910	Lady-series
1907	20	170	2259–2278	2911–2930	2911–2930	Saint-series
1911	10	185	2426–2435	2931–2940	2931–2940	Court-series
1912	10	189	2476–2485	2941–2950	2941–2950	Court-series
1913	5	192	2506–2510	—	2951–2955	Court-series

== Performance ==
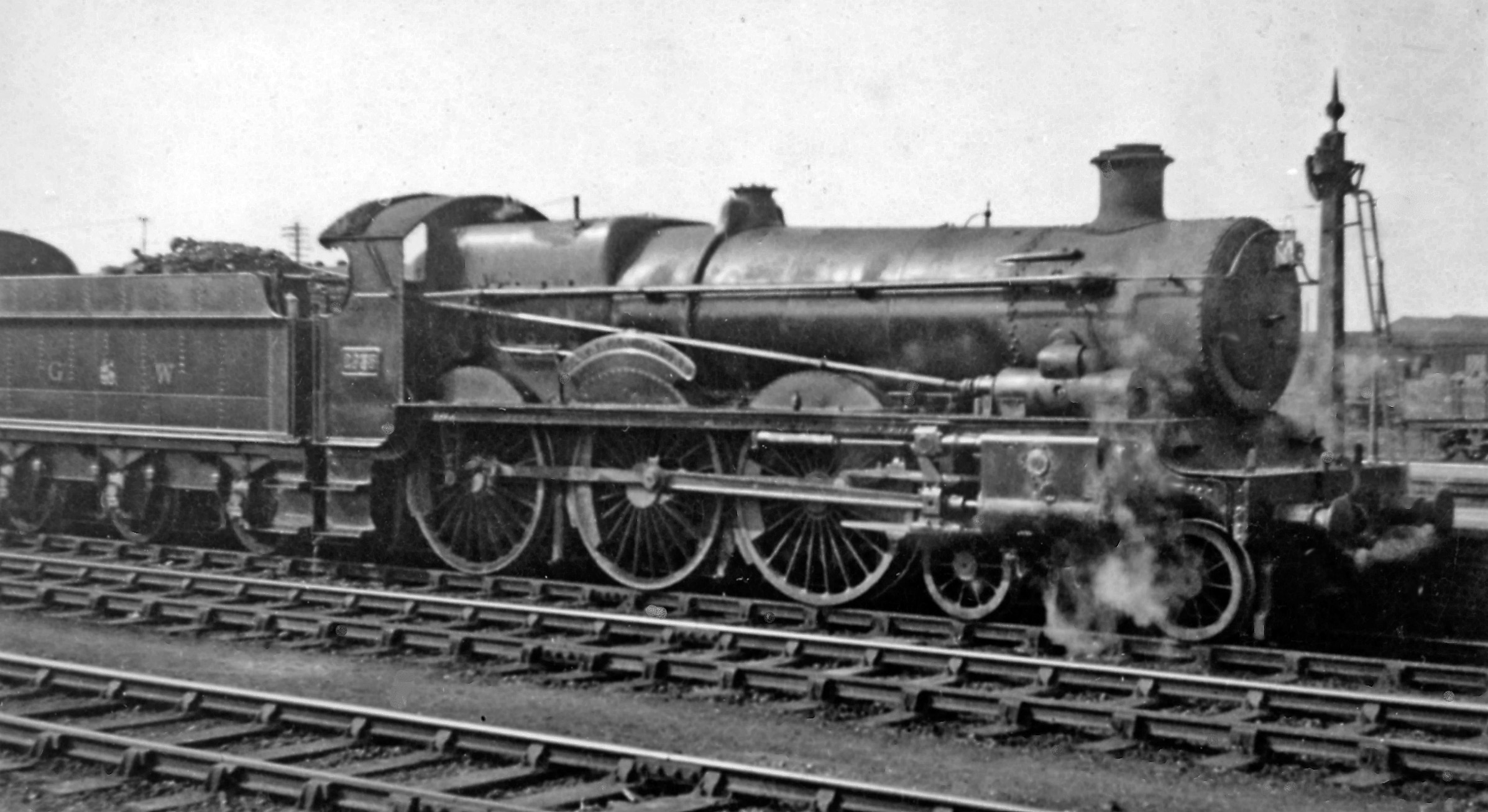
2935 Caynham Court as rebuilt in 1931 with Lentz-style rotary-cam poppet valves, at Swindon 1946

Gwr Saint With Gwr GWR 111 The Great Bear Tender on Passenger Train

The locomotives performed well as passenger locomotives over all the long-distance routes of the GWR and on all but the fastest express trains until they gradually became displaced to secondary services by the Castle Class in the late 1920s and 1930s. However, the 6 ft 8 1/2 in (2.045 m) driving wheels limited their usefulness on freight trains. Churchward had recognized this limitation by the introduction of his GWR 4700 Class 2-8-0 design with 5 ft 8 in (1.727 m) driving wheels in 1919, intended for express goods trains. However, Churchward's successor Charles Collett felt that a smaller-wheeled version of the 'Saint' class could form the basis of a successful mixed-traffic class of locomotives. He therefore rebuilt No. 2925 Saint Martin with 6 ft (1.829 m) driving wheels to become the prototype of his successful Hall Class locomotives. Thus the 2900 class became a template for later GWR 2-cylinder 4-6-0 classes including the Modified Hall, Grange, Manor and County classes, all of which were of the same basic design. Moreover they also influenced similar engines on other railways such as the LMS "Black Fives", the LNER B1s and the BR Standard Class 5s.

Collett also experimented on several other members of the class. In 1923 No. 2933 was given an altered blastpipe and in 1927 No. 2947 was fitted with cylinder by-pass valves. In 1931 No. 2935 was rebuilt with Lentz-style rotary cam poppet valve gear, which remained in use until the engine was scrapped in 1948.

== Assessment ==
The class incorporated many revolutionary advances which were influential in British locomotive design for the next fifty years. According to The Great Western Society, 'Saint' class locomotives "represented one of the most important steps forward in railway traction of the 20th century", and they "are now acknowledged to have had a profound influence on almost every aspect of subsequent steam locomotive development". W.A. Tuplin commented; "No other locomotive design, except perhaps Stephenson's 'Rocket', has represented such a long leap in the right direction as GWR No. 98.".

== Accidents and incidents ==
- On 6 January 1932, locomotive No. 2949 Stanford Court was hauling a milk train that overran signals at Didcot East Junction and collided with a freight train, which was being hauled by GWR 2800 Class 2-8-0 No. 2808. The locomotive was derailed and six wagons were slightly damaged.

== List of original locomotives ==
No.	Name	Built	Withdrawn	Notes
2900	William Dean	February 1902	June 1932	Originally unnamed. Carried name Dean from June to November 1902
2901	Lady Superior	May 1906	April 1933	Named October 1906
2902	Lady of the Lake	May 1906	August 1949	Named April 1907
2903	Lady of Lyons	May 1906	November 1949	Named April 1907
2904	Lady Godiva	May 1906	October 1932	Named April 1907
2905	Lady Macbeth	May 1906	April 1948	Named April 1907
2906	Lady of Lynn	May 1906	August 1952	Named May 1907 Connecting rods donated to 2999 Lady of Legend project
2907	Lady Disdain	May 1906	July 1933	Named April 1907
2908	Lady of Quality	May 1906	December 1950	Named May 1907
2909	Lady of Provence	May 1906	November 1931	Named May 1907
2910	Lady of Shalott	May 1906	October 1931	Named May 1907 Whistle donated to 2999 Lady of Legend project
2911	Saint Agatha	August 1907	March 1935	
2912	Saint Ambrose	August 1907	February 1951	
2913	Saint Andrew	August 1907	May 1948	
2914	Saint Augustine	August 1907	January 1946	
2915	Saint Bartholomew	August 1907	October 1950	
2916	Saint Benedict	August 1907	July 1948	
2917	Saint Bernard	August 1907	October 1934	
2918	Saint Catherine	August 1907	February 1935	
2919	Saint Cuthbert	September 1907	February 1932	Originally named Saint Cecelia; renamed October 1907
2920	Saint David	September 1907	October 1953	The Last Saint to be withdrawn from service
2921	Saint Dunstan	September 1907	December 1946	
2922	Saint Gabriel	September 1907	January 1945	
2923	Saint George	September 1907	October 1934	
2924	Saint Helena	September 1907	March 1950	
2925	Saint Martin	September 1907	December 1924	Rebuilt to prototype Hall class
2926	Saint Nicholas	September 1907	September 1951	
2927	Saint Patrick	September 1907	December 1951	
2928	Saint Sebastian	September 1907	August 1948	
2929	Saint Stephen	September 1907	December 1949	
2930	Saint Vincent	September 1907	November 1949	
2931	Arlington Court	October 1911	February 1951	
2932	Ashton Court	October 1911	June 1951	
2933	Bibury Court	November 1911	January 1953	
2934	Butleigh Court	November 1911	June 1952	
2935	Caynham Court	November 1911	December 1948	
2936	Cefntilla Court	November 1911	April 1951	
2937	Clevedon Court	December 1911	June 1953	
2938	Corsham Court	December 1911	August 1952	
2939	Croome Court	December 1911	December 1950	
2940	Dorney Court	December 1911	January 1952	
2941	Easton Court	May 1912	December 1949	
2942	Fawley Court	May 1912	December 1949	
2943	Hampton Court	May 1912	January 1951	
2944	Highnam Court	May 1912	November 1951	
2945	Hillingdon Court	June 1912	June 1953	
2946	Langford Court	June 1912	November 1949	
2947	Madresfield Court	June 1912	April 1951	
2948	Stackpole Court	June 1912	November 1951	
2949	Stanford Court	May 1912	January 1952	
2950	Taplow Court	May 1912	September 1952	
2951	Tawstock Court	March 1913	June 1952	
2952	Twineham Court	March 1913	September 1951	
2953	Titley Court	March 1913	February 1952	
2954	Tockenham Court	March 1913	July 1952	
2955	Tortworth Court	April 1913	May 1950	
2971	Albion	December 1903	February 1946	Built as No. 171. Named Albion February 1904. Rebuilt to 4-4-2, October 1904. Renamed The Pirate March 1907. Rebuilt back to 4-6-0, July 1907 and renamed Albion. Renumbered 2971, 1913.
2972	The Abbot	February 1905	March 1935	Built as 4-4-2 No. 172 Quicksilver, named after a stagecoach operating between London and Devonport. Renamed March 1907. Rebuilt as 4-6-0, April 1912.
2973	Robins Bolitho	March 1905	July 1933	Built as No. 173
2974	Lord Barrymore	March 1905	August 1933	Built as No. 174 Barrymore. Renamed, May 1905
2975	Lord Palmer	March 1905	November 1944	Built as unnamed No. 175. Named Viscount Churchill, 1907. Renamed Sir Ernest Palmer, February 1924. Renamed Lord Palmer, in October 1933.
2976	Winterstoke	April 1905	January 1934	Built as unnamed No. 176. Named, April 1907.
2977	Robertson	April 1905	February 1935	Built as unnamed No. 177. Named, April 1907.
2978	Charles J. Hambro	April 1905	August 1946	Built as No. 178 Kirkland, named after racehorse owned by Sir Frank Bibby. Renamed, May 1935.
2979	Quentin Durward	April 1905	January 1951	Built as 4-4-2 No. 179 Magnet. Renamed, March 1907. Rebuilt as 4-6-0, August 1912.
2980	Coeur de Lion	May 1905	May 1948	Built as unnamed 4-4-2 No. 180. Named in March 1907 after subject of the novel Ivanhoe by Sir Walter Scott. Rebuilt as 4-6-0, January 1913.
2981	Ivanhoe	June 1905	March 1951	Built as unnamed 4-4-2 No. 181. Named in 1907. Rebuilt as 4-6-0, July 1912.
2982	Lalla Rookh	June 1905	June 1946	Built as unnamed 4-4-2 No. 182. Named in 1906. Rebuilt as 4-6-0, November 1912.
2983	Redgauntlet	July 1905	March 1946	Built as 4-4-2 No. 183 Red Gauntlet. Rebuilt as 4-6-0, April 1912. Renamed Redgauntlet, June 1915.
2984	Guy Mannering	July 1905	May 1933	Built as 4-4-2 No. 184 Churchill. Renamed Viscount Churchill in 1906. Renamed Guy Mannering, 1907. Rebuilt as 4-6-0, August 1912.
2985	Peveril of the Peak	July 1905	August 1931	Built as unnamed 4-4-2 No. 185. Named Winterstoke, February 1906. Renamed Peveril of the Peak, April 1907. Rebuilt as 4-6-0, May 1912. Withdrawn August 1931. First scheduled withdrawal.
2986	Robin Hood	July 1905	November 1932	Built as unnamed 4-4-2 No. 186. Named in April 1906. Rebuilt as 4-6-0, May 1912.
2987	Bride of Lammermoor	August 1905	October 1949	Built as unnamed 4-4-2 No. 187. Named Robertson after a GWR Director, November 1905. Renamed Bride of Lammermoor, April 1907. Rebuilt as 4-6-0, June 1912.
2988	Rob Roy	August 1905	May 1948	Built as unnamed 4-4-2 No. 188. Named, 1907. Rebuilt as 4-6-0, May 1912.
2989	Talisman	September 1905	September 1948	Built as unnamed 4-4-2 No. 189. Named, 1906. Rebuilt as 4-6-0, October 1912.
2990	Waverley	September 1905	January 1939	Built as unnamed 4-4-2 No. 190. Named, 1906. Rebuilt as 4-6-0, November 1912.
2998	Ernest Cunard	March 1903	June 1933	Built as unnamed No. 98. Named Persimmon, 1906. Renamed Vanguard, March 1907. Renamed Ernest Cunard, December 1907. Renumbered 2998 in 1913.

== Withdrawal ==
The below list shows when all of the original 2900's were withdrawn from service.

Table of withdrawals
Year	Quantity in service at start of year	Number withdrawn	Quantity withdrawn	Locomotive numbers
1924	77	1	1	2925.
1931	76	3	4	2909–10/85.
1932	73	4	8	2900/4/19/86.
1933	69	6	14	2901/7/73–74/84/98.
1934	63	4	18	2917/23/76/82.
1935	59	4	22	2911/18/72/77.
1939	55	1	23	2990.
1944	54	2	25	2922/75.
1945	52	1	26	2921.
1946	51	4	30	2914/71/78/83.
1948	47	8	38	2905/13/16/28/35/80/88–89.
1949	39	8	46	2902–3/29-30/41–42/46/87.
1950	31	5	51	2908/15/24/39/55.
1951	26	13	64	2912/26–27/31–32/36/43–44/47–48/52/79/81.
1952	13	9	73	2906/34/38/40/49–51/53–54.
1953	4	4	77	2920/33/37/45.

== No. 2999 Lady of Legend ==
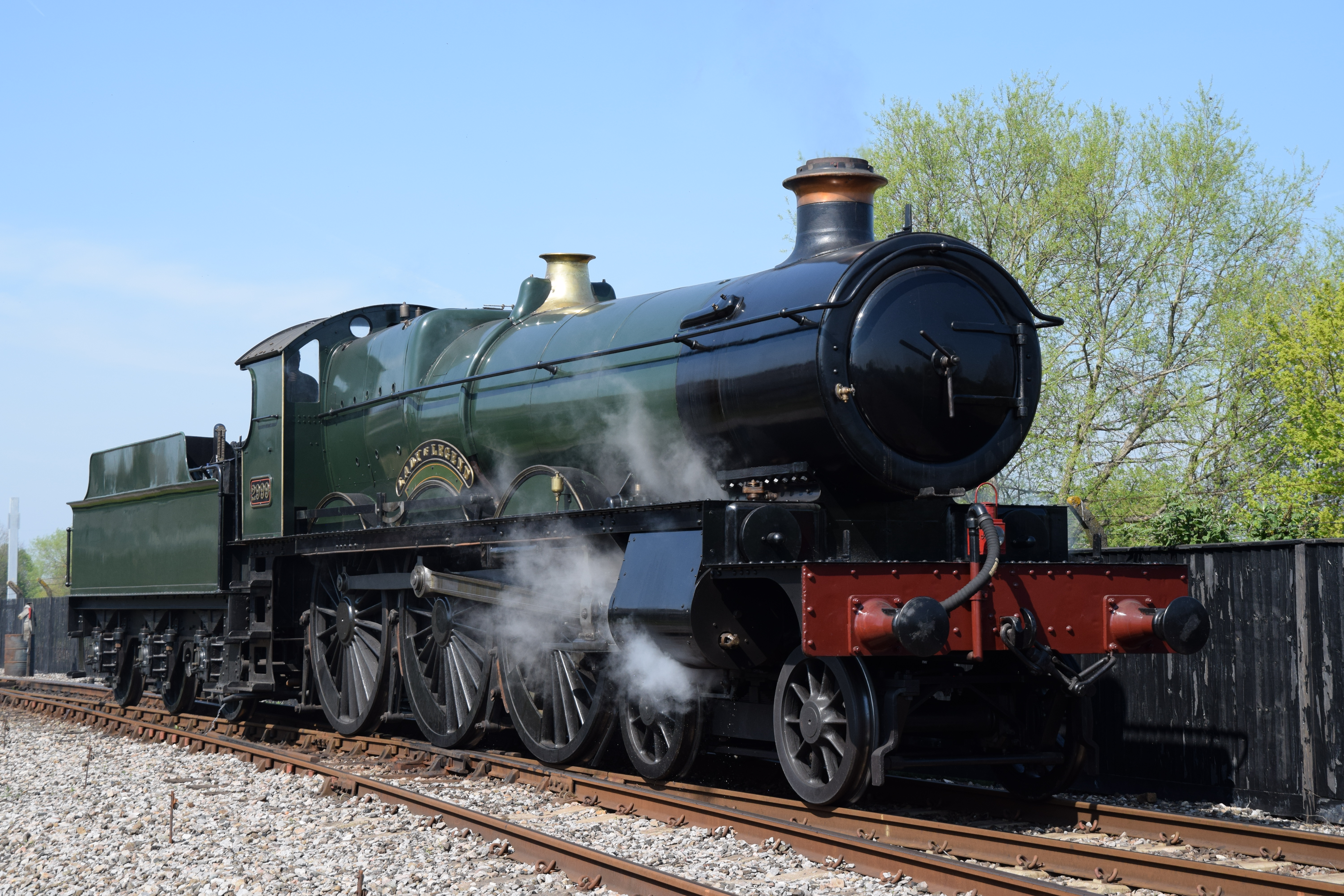
2999 Lady of Legend, on the demonstration running line at Didcot Railway Centre in April 2019

None of the original Saints survived into preservation, so the Great Western Society purchased GWR 4900 Hall Class 4-6-0 No. 4942 Maindy Hall from Barry Scrapyard in 1974, with the intention to rebuild it as a Saint. This would reverse the procedure whereby a Saint was rebuilt as the Hall prototype. The project finally began in earnest in 1995, by which time engineering capability in the preservation movement had greatly increased. It was decided that the engine would be built in the original straight frame form like the first Saints instead of the later curved frame style as fitted to Maindy Hall. Following thirty years of storage and fifteen years of rebuilding work, 2999 Lady of Legend made its first moves in April 2019 and was formally launched at the Didcot Railway Centre in the same month.

== See also ==
- List of GWR standard classes with two outside cylinders
