= George W. G. Allen =

George W. G. Allen MC FSA
- Born: 12 January 1891; Oxford, Oxfordshire, England
- Died: November 1940 (aged 49)
- Education: Royal Military Academy, Woolwich
- Known for: Aerial photography for archaeological research

Major George W. G. Allen, MC, FSA (12 January 1891 – November 1940) was a British engineer who pioneered aerial photography for the purpose of archaeological research.

== Early life and war service ==
Born in Oxford on 12 January 1891, the eldest son of John Allen (1857–1934), George Allen was educated at Boxgrove School, Guildford, and Clifton College. He attended the Royal Military Academy, Woolwich, but as he was not able to get into the Royal Engineers he left to become an engineer as a civilian, and worked for Humphreys and Sons, consulting engineers as a waterworks engineer on the East Coast of Africa, before becoming a manager of his father's company.

During the First World War, Allen served in the Royal Tank Corps and was awarded the Military Cross. On 1 August 1918, he was made a temporary major while working as a General Staff Officer, 2nd Grade. He rejoined his father's company after the war.

== Aerial photography of archaeological sites ==
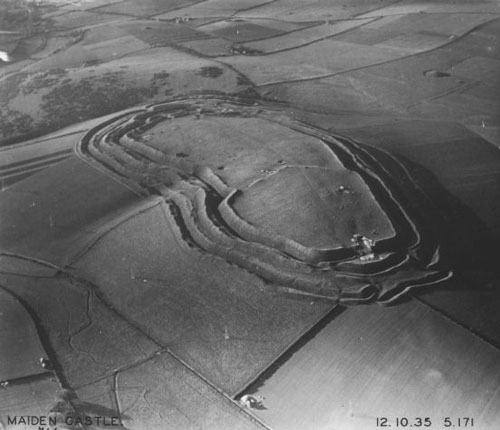
Major George W. G. Allen’s 1935 aerial photograph of Maiden Castle, one of the largest hillforts in Europe.

In 1929 Allen learned to fly and purchased a red De Havilland Puss Moth, which he named Maid of the Mist, the first privately owned aeroplane in Oxford, which he kept at his own airfield at Clifton Hampden. Piloting his aircraft and using a hand‐made camera, he made aerial pictures mostly taken between 1933 and 1938 of known, and previously unknown, unrecorded archaeological sites.

He took about 2000 photographs, mostly oblique, taken from an altitude of only 300–450 metres, a contribution that enabled interpretation by O. G. S. Crawford of archaeological sites in Wiltshire, Hampshire, Kent, Somerset, Hertfordshire, Dorset, Gloucestershire and Lincolnshire, but most especially in Oxfordshire. His success in detecting such sites as the Icknield Way was due to his observation and recording of what was revealed by relief in raking light and as the change in seasons and rainfall patterns altered vegetation cover, which was often densest where covered-over excavations had held moisture.

In 1936 he was elected a Fellow of the Society of Antiquaries.

== Veteran vehicles hobby ==
G W G Allen made a hobby of finding, restoring and running veteran vehicles. Notable among these was the Grenville steam carriage.

He was killed in a motor‐cycle accident in November 1940.

After his death, his camera and photographs were given to the Ashmolean Museum.

== Publications ==
- Allen, G.W.G., 'Discovery from the Air', posthumously published in J.S.P Bradford and O.S.G. Crawford, ed., Aerial Archaeology Vol 10 (1984)
