= GWR 2221 Class =

Class of steam locomotives

GWR 2221 "County Tank" Class
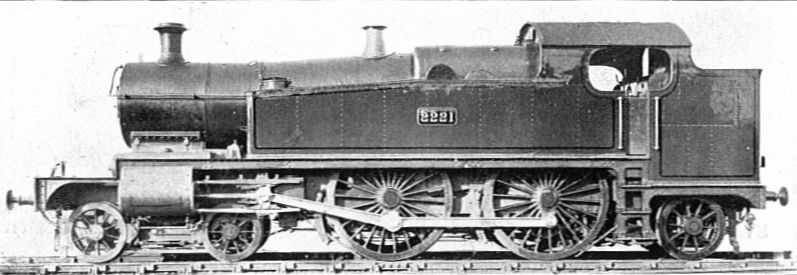
- 2221 in 1907
Type and origin
- Power type: Steam
- Designer: George Jackson Churchward
- Builder: Swindon Works
- Order number: Lots 151, 175, 188
- Serial number: 2076–2085, 2320–2329, 2466–2475
- Build date: 1905–1909, 1912
- Total produced: 30
Specifications
- Configuration
  - Whyte: 4-4-2T
  - UIC: 2′B1 ht
- Gauge: 4 ft 8 1/2 in (1,435 mm) standard gauge
- Driver dia.: 6 ft 8 1/2 in (2.045 m)
- Fuel type: Coal
- Firebox
  - Grate area: 20.35 sq ft (1.89 m^{2})
- Boiler
  - Type: GWR Standard No. 2
- Boiler pressure: 200 lbf/in^{2} (1.38 MPa)
- Heating surface
  - Firebox: 121.31 sq ft (11.27 m^{2})
  - Tubes and flues: 1,396.58 sq ft (129.75 m^{2})
  - Total surface: 1,517.89 sq ft (141.02 m^{2})
- Superheater
  - Heating area: 184.75 sq ft (17.164 m^{2})
- Cylinders: Two, outside
- Cylinder size: 18 in × 30 in (457 mm × 762 mm)
Performance figures
- Tractive effort: 20,530 lbf (91.32 kN)
Career
- Operators: Great Western Railway
- Numbers: 2221–2250
- Withdrawn: 1931–1934
- Disposition: All scrapped

The Great Western Railway (GWR) 2221 Class or County Tank was a class of 4-4-2T steam locomotive, effectively a tank engine version of the 3800 "County" Class 4-4-0 tender locomotives. The two classes had different boilers, standard no 4 for the tender locomotive, and the smaller (by about 350 sq ft or 33 m^{2}) standard no 2 for the tank. 2230 was fitted with the larger boiler when new, but this was unsuccessful and was quickly altered.

== Construction ==
Thirty were built between 1905 and 1912 to replace the 3600 "Birdcage" Class. They were built in three batches of ten, the batches having minor differences. In the final batch the drop in the front framing above the cylinders was curved, the cylinders were also lower, superheaters and top feed were fitted from new. Later in life, the earlier members of the class were fitted with superheaters, and some were given larger bunkers in line with other standard tank classes.

Table of order and numbers
Year	Quantity	Lot No.	Works Nos.	Locomotive numbers	Notes
1905–06	10	151	2076–2085	2221–2230	
1908–09	10	175	2320–2329	2231–2240	
1912	10	188	2466–2475	2241–2250	

== Use ==
Their work was concentrated on London suburban services. They were replaced by the more versatile GWR 6100 Class from 1931 onwards, the last going in 1934. Their large four coupled driving wheels were suited to high speed running on outer suburban services but acceleration was slower than that of the six coupled, smaller wheeled locomotives.

== Reputation ==
Like the Counties, they had a reputation for rough riding, caused by their short coupled wheelbase and large outside cylinders.

== Preservation ==
Whilst none survived into preservation, the Great Western Society at Didcot have expressed an interest in building a 2221 County class tank locomotive using the boiler from 5101 class locomotive 4115. By November 2018 it appeared that the project was in abeyance.

== See also ==
- List of GWR standard classes with two outside cylinders

== Sources ==
- Allcock, N. J.; Davies, F. K.; le Fleming, H. M.; Maskelyne, J. N.; Reed, P. J. T.; Tabor, F. J. (1968) [1951]. White, D. E. (ed.). The Locomotives of the Great Western Railway, part one: Preliminary Survey. Kenilworth: RCTS.
- Haresnape, Brian; Swain, Alec (1976). Churchward locomotives : a pictorial history. London: I. Allan. ISBN 0-7110-0697-0.
- le Fleming, H. M. (February 1962). White, D. E. (ed.). The Locomotives of the Great Western Railway, part nine: Standard Two-Cylinder Classes. RCTS. ISBN 0-901115-37-1. OCLC 655827210.
