= Charles Hambro =

Charles Hambro may refer to:

- Charles Hambro, Baron Hambro (1930–2002), British banker and politician
- Sir Charles Jocelyn Hambro (1897–1963), British banker, soldier and intelligence officer
- Charles J. T. Hambro (1834–1891), British politician, MP for Weymouth & Melcombe Regis 1868–1874, Dorset South 1886–1891
- Sir Charles Eric Hambro (1872–1947), British merchant banker and politician
