= GWR 1000 Class =

British steam locomotives (1945–1964)

GWR 1000 "County" class
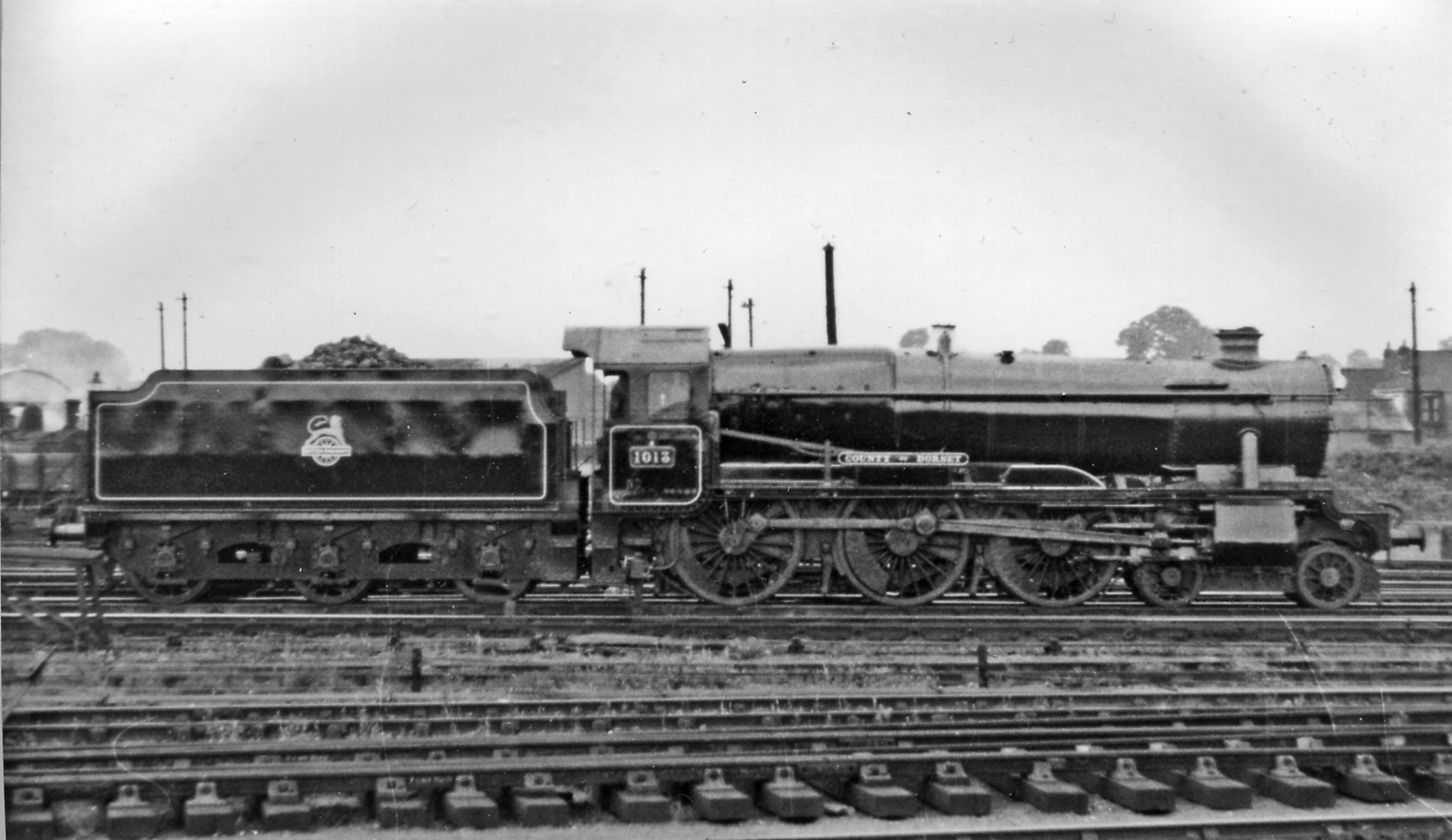
- 1013 County of Dorset at Gloucester Eastgate railway station, 1953.
Type and origin
- Power type: Steam
- Designer: Frederick Hawksworth
- Builder: GWR Swindon Works
- Order number: Lots 354, 358
- Build date: August 1945 – April 1947
- Total produced: 30
Specifications
- Configuration
  - Whyte: 4-6-0
  - UIC: 2'Ch2
- Gauge: 4 ft 8 1/2 in (1,435 mm) standard gauge
- Leading dia.: 3 ft 0 in (914 mm)
- Driver dia.: 6 ft 3 in (1,905 mm)
- Minimum curve: 8 chains (528 ft; 161 m) normal, 7 chains (462 ft; 141 m) slow
- Length: 63 ft 0 1/4 in (19.21 m)
- Width: 8 ft 11 1/8 in (2.721 m)
- Height: 13 ft 5 in (4.089 m)
- Axle load: 19 long tons 14 cwt (44,100 lb or 20 t) (22.1 short tons) full
- Adhesive weight: 59 long tons 2 cwt (132,400 lb or 60 t) (66.2 short tons) full
- Loco weight: 76 long tons 17 cwt (172,100 lb or 78.1 t) (86.1 short tons)full
- Tender weight: 49 long tons 0 cwt (109,800 lb or 49.8 t) (54.9 short tons) full
- Fuel type: Coal
- Fuel capacity: 7 long tons 0 cwt (15,700 lb or 7.1 t) (7.8 short tons)
- Water cap.: 4,000 imp gal (18,000 L; 4,800 US gal)
- Firebox
  - Grate area: 28.84 sq ft (2.679 m^{2})
- Boiler: GWR Standard No. 15
- Boiler pressure: 280 psi (1.93 MPa) later reduced to 250 psi (1.72 MPa)
- Heating surface
  - Firebox: 169.0 sq ft (15.70 m^{2})
  - Tubes and flues: 1,545.0 sq ft (143.54 m^{2})
- Superheater
  - Heating area: 254.0 sq ft (23.60 m^{2})
- Cylinders: Two, outside
- Cylinder size: 18.5 in × 30 in (470 mm × 762 mm)
- Valve gear: Stephenson
- Valve type: piston valves
Performance figures
- Tractive effort: 32,580 lbf (144.92 kN), later reduced to 29,090 lbf (129.40 kN)
Career
- Operators: Great Western Railway; British Railways
- Class: GWR: 1000
- Power class: GWR: D BR: 6MT
- Numbers: 1000–1029
- Axle load class: GWR: Red
- Retired: September 1962 – November 1964
- Disposition: All original locomotives scrapped; replica under construction

The Great Western Railway 1000 Class or County Class was a class of 4-6-0 steam locomotive. Thirty examples were built between 1945 and 1947, but all were withdrawn and scrapped in the early 1960s. A replica locomotive is under construction.

== Background ==
These locomotives were the final and most powerful development of the two-cylinder Saint Class introduced in 1901 and included several features that had already been used on the successful Modified Hall class.

The Chief Mechanical Engineer of the GWR Frederick W. Hawksworth had hoped to design a new 4-6-2 (Pacific) express locomotive for post war traffic, when he took up office in 1941 but had been prevented by the war from doing so. This scheme was not entirely dead in 1945 when he was given the authority to build another batch of mixed-traffic 4-6-0s. Rather than build more examples of existing designs, Hawksworth introduced the County Class as a testbed for a number of the ideas he hoped to incorporate into the Pacific at a later date. Hawksworth was not subsequently allowed to build his Pacific, as there was no need for further express passenger locomotives.

== Design ==
In addition to the innovations already adopted for the Modified Hall class, the new class contained several further changes from usual Great Western practice including the use of double chimneys on certain members and a high boiler pressure of 280 psi (1.93 MPa) (although this was later lowered in an attempt to reduce maintenance costs). The boiler was a development that used the tooling for the LMS Stanier Class 8F boiler, Hawksworth being able to study this design closely when 8Fs were being built at Swindon as part of the war effort.

The class initially had a tractive effort of 32,580 lbf (144.92 kN), which was 1,000 lbf (4.45 kN) greater than a Castle Class locomotive, although the tractive effort was reduced to 29,090 lbf (129.40 kN) when the boiler pressure was lowered. The class had continuous splashers over the driving wheels and, when named, straight nameplates, making them immediately recognisable from other 4-6-0 classes. They were also fitted with Hawksworth's 4,000 imp gal (18,000 L; 4,800 US gal) slab-sided tenders, but the County tenders had a water tank six inches wider than the tenders built for the Modified Halls and retro-fitted to many earlier designs.

Some of the early design studies for what became the County included outside Walschaerts valve gear which would have been a major break from traditional GWR designs. In the event the standard inside Stephenson link motion of the Churchward and Collett two cylinder classes was used. The GWR 1500 Class, also designed by Hawksworth, used outside Walschaerts (Note: Lack of clearance around the large and low-set cylinders of the 15xx required a modified layout for the anchor link from the crosshead) as did the steam railcar units designed under Churchward and the narrow gauge Vale of Rheidol 2-6-2T.

== Production ==
The first batch of twenty were built at Swindon Works and delivered between August 1945 and March 1946 (Lot No. 354). They were originally unnamed and were planned to be numbered in the 9900 series, but this was changed to 1000-1019 before introduction. A second batch of ten further locomotives (1020-1029) were built between April 1946 and April 1947 (Swindon Lot 358). The second batch were given names English and Welsh Counties previously used on the GWR 3800 Class of 4-4-0 tender locomotives that were part of George Jackson Churchward's locomotive standardisation programme in the early days of the 20th century.

== Operation ==
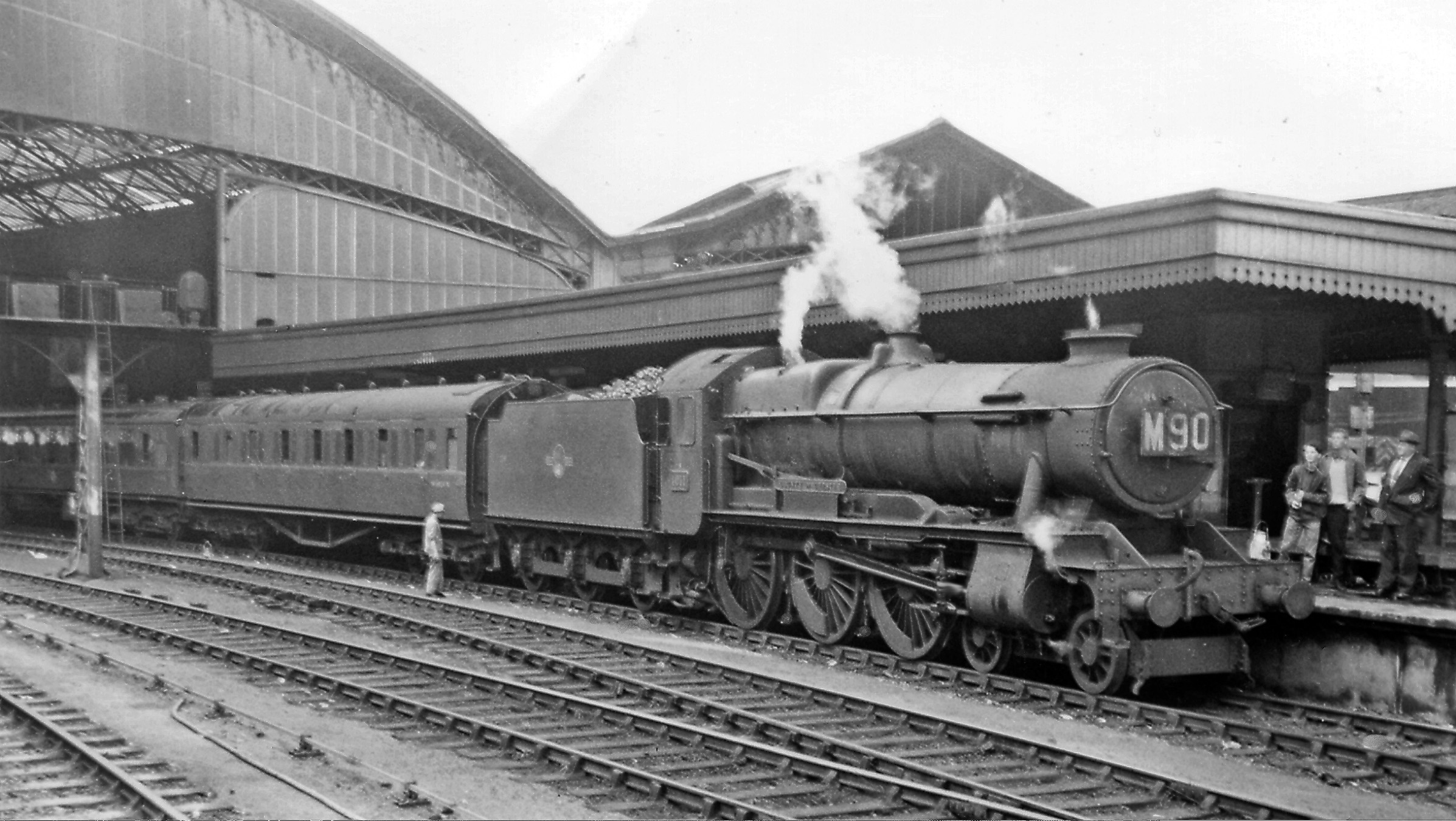
1011 County of Chester at Bristol Temple Meads 1963

The Counties had a mixed reception: some traditionalists regarded them as ‘non-standard, expensive and unnecessary,’ others considered them a successful, free steaming design, well suited to express or freight work and a fitting finale to GW two-cylinder 4-6-0 development. According to O.S. Nock ‘their best and really brilliant work was done north of Wolverhampton where they ran very heavy trains with conspicuous success.’

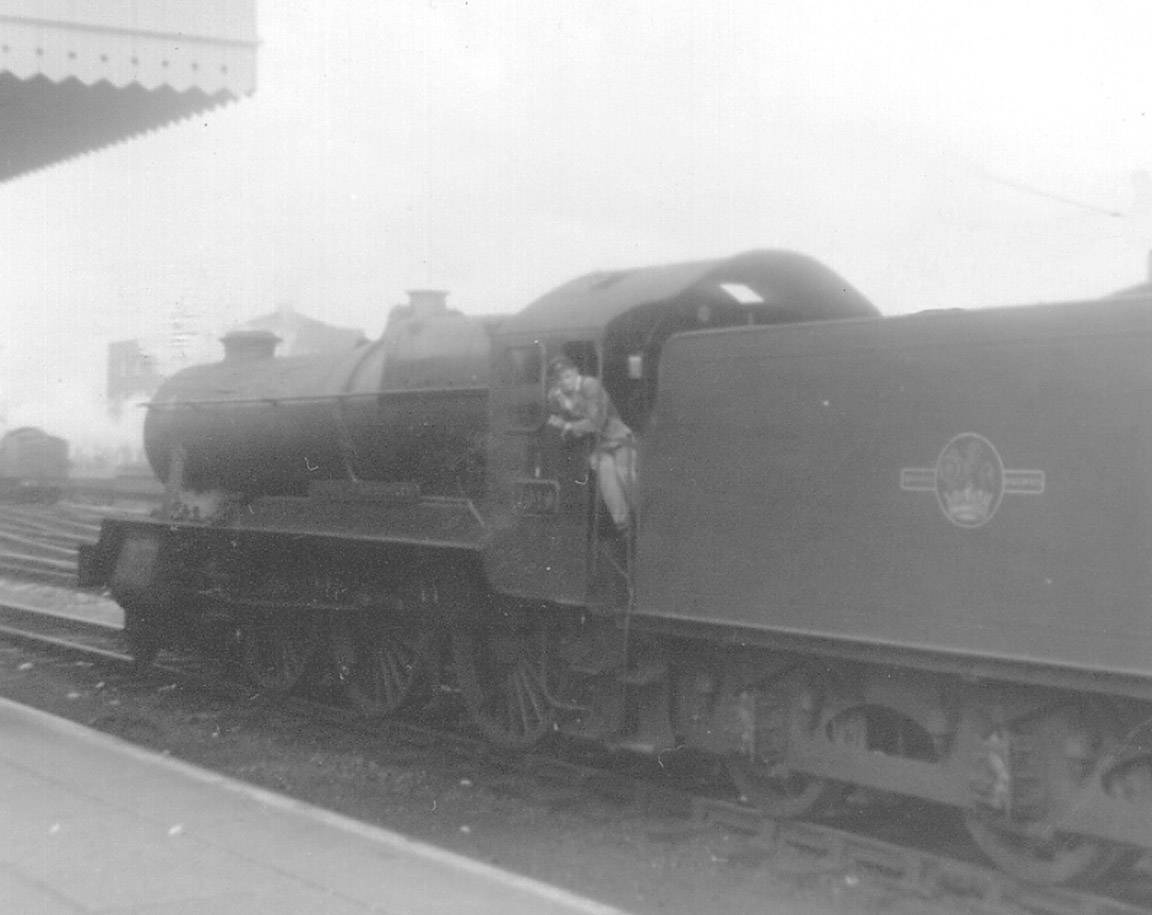
1019 County of Merioneth at Bristol Temple Meads, 1960

== British Railways ==
After the nationalisation of Britain's railways in 1948 all 30 Counties continued to do useful work throughout the Western Region of British Railways, working with Castles on expresses to and from Paddington as well as more menial freight and parcels tasks. BR gave the Counties the power classification 6MT. Speedometers were fitted to the class from 1950 and modified double chimneys from 1956.

== Withdrawal ==
Withdrawals of the class took place between September 1962 and November 1964. No. 1011 County of Chester was the last of the class withdrawn. It was placed in storage before being sold to Cashmore's scrapyard in Newport where it was cut up in March 1965. All were scrapped.

Table of withdrawals
| Year | Quantity in service at start of year | Number withdrawn | Quantity withdrawn | Locomotive numbers |
|---|---|---|---|---|
| 1962 | 30 | 9 | 9 | 1003–04/07/15/17–18/22/26/29. |
| 1963 | 21 | 13 | 22 | 1001–02/05–06/08–09/16/19/21/23/25/27–28. |
| 1964 | 8 | 8 | 30 | 1000/10–14/20/24. |

== Preservation ==
No locomotives of this class survived into preservation. However a replica is being built at the Didcot Railway Centre, home of the Great Western Society. When completed it will take the name and number of No. 1014 County of Glamorgan in recognition of the late Dai Woodham's Barry Scrapyard in Glamorganshire from which many withdrawn steam locomotives were saved for preservation. Also Glamorganshire County Council donated the frames and boiler for the project. The replica is based around the frames from Modified Hall Class 7927 Willington Hall and the boiler from LMS Stanier 8F 48518. The boiler from the Hall will be used in the replica Grange project at the Llangollen Railway. It will also have a number of smaller original parts off scrapped County locomotives including the chimney from 1006 County of Cornwall.

== Models ==
Hornby Railways manufacture a model of the 10xx in OO gauge. This model was originally made by Dapol.

== Stock list ==
| Number | Name | Built | Withdrawn | Scrapped | Notes |
|---|---|---|---|---|---|
| 1000 | County of Middlesex | August 1945 | July 1964 | Cashmore, Newport | |
| 1001 | County of Buckingham | September 1945 | May 1963 | Cashmore, Newport | |
| 1002 | County of Berks | September 1945 | September 1963 | Ward, Sheffield | |
| 1003 | County of Wilts | October 1945 | October 1962 | Cashmore, Newport | |
| 1004 | County of Somerset | October 1945 | September 1962 | Cashmore, Newport | |
| 1005 | County of Devon | November 1945 | June 1963 | Cashmore, Newport | |
| 1006 | County of Cornwall | November 1945 | September 1963 | Cooper, Sharpness | Chimney donated to replica 1014 County of Glamorgan project |
| 1007 | County of Brecknock | December 1945 | October 1962 | King, Norwich | |
| 1008 | County of Cardigan | December 1945 | October 1963 | Cashmore, Newport | |
| 1009 | County of Carmarthen | December 1945 | February 1963 | Swindon Works | |
| 1010 | County of Caernarvon | January 1946 | July 1964 | Cashmore, Newport | Name originally spelled County of Carnarvon |
| 1011 | County of Chester | January 1946 | November 1964 | Cashmore, Newport | Last to be withdrawn. Regulator donated to replica 1014 County of Glamorgan project |
| 1012 | County of Denbigh | February 1946 | April 1964 | Cashmore, Newport | |
| 1013 | County of Dorset | February 1946 | July 1964 | Cashmore, Newport | |
| 1014 | County of Glamorgan | February 1946 | April 1964 | Cashmore, Newport | Replica under construction |
| 1015 | County of Gloucester | March 1946 | December 1962 | Cashmore, Newport | |
| 1016 | County of Hants | March 1946 | September 1963 | Ward, Sheffield | |
| 1017 | County of Hereford | March 1946 | December 1962 | Ward, Sheffield | |
| 1018 | County of Leicester | March 1946 | September 1962 | King, Norwich | |
| 1019 | County of Merioneth | April 1946 | February 1963 | Cashmore, Great Bridge | |
| 1020 | County of Monmouth | December 1946 | February 1964 | Hayes, Bridgend | |
| 1021 | County of Montgomery | December 1946 | November 1963 | Hayes, Bridgend | |
| 1022 | County of Northampton | December 1946 | October 1962 | Ward, Sheffield | |
| 1023 | County of Oxford | January 1947 | March 1963 | Swindon Works | |
| 1024 | County of Pembroke | January 1947 | April 1964 | Swindon Works | Reverser donated to replica 1014 County of Glamorgan project |
| 1025 | County of Radnor | January 1947 | February 1963 | Cashmore, Great Bridge | |
| 1026 | County of Salop | January 1947 | September 1962 | Ward, Sheffield | |
| 1027 | County of Stafford | March 1947 | October 1963 | Cooper, Sharpness | |
| 1028 | County of Warwick | March 1947 | December 1963 | Birds, Risca | |
| 1029 | County of Worcester | April 1947 | December 1962 | Cashmore, Newport | |

== See also ==
- List of GWR standard classes with two outside cylinders
