= GWR 3800 Class =

Class of steam locomotive

GWR 3800 'County' Class
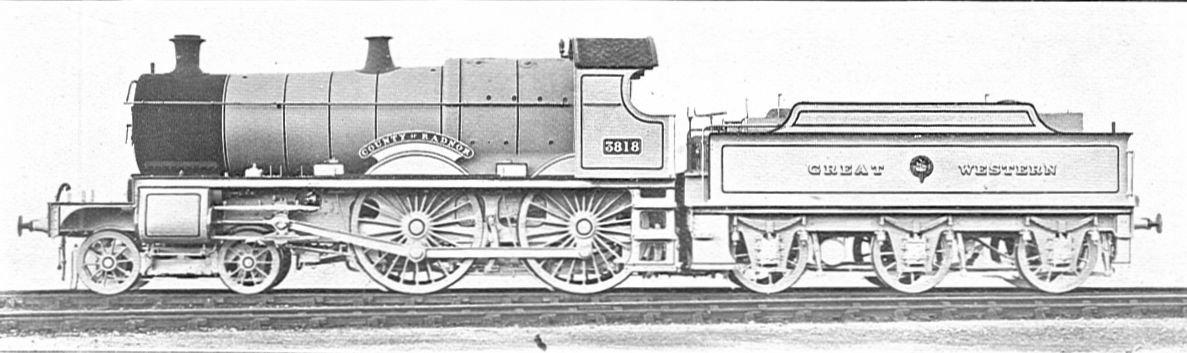
- 3818 County of Radnor as built in 1906
Type and origin
- Power type: Steam
- Designer: George Jackson Churchward
- Builder: Swindon Works, Great Western Railway
- Order number: Lots 149, 165, 184
- Serial number: 2056–2065, 2209–2228, 2415–2425
- Build date: 1904, 1906, 1911–12
- Total produced: 40
Specifications
- Configuration
  - Whyte: 4-4-0
- Gauge: 4 ft 8 1/2 in (1,435 mm) standard gauge
- Leading dia.: 3 ft 2 in (965 mm)
- Driver dia.: 6 ft 8 1/2 in (2,045 mm)
- Wheelbase: 24 ft 0 in (7,315 mm)
- Axle load: 18.15 long tons (18.44 t; 20.33 short tons)
- Adhesive weight: 34.3 long tons (34.85 t; 38.42 short tons)
- Loco weight: 55.3 long tons (56.19 t; 61.94 short tons)
- Tender weight: 36.75 long tons (37.34 t; 41.16 short tons)
- Total weight: 92.05 long tons (93.53 t; 103.10 short tons)
- Fuel type: Coal
- Water cap.: 3,000 imp gal (13,638 L; 3,603 US gal)
- Firebox
  - Grate area: 20.56 sq ft (1.91 m^{2})
- Boiler: GWR Standard No. 4
- Boiler pressure: 200 psi (1,379 kPa)
- Heating surface
  - Firebox: 128.30 sq ft (11.92 m^{2})
  - Tubes: 1,689.82 sq ft (156.99 m^{2})
  - Total surface: 1,818.12 sq ft (168.91 m^{2})
- Cylinders: 2, outside
- Cylinder size: 18 in × 30 in (457 mm × 762 mm) diameter x stroke
- Valve gear: Stephenson
Performance figures
- Tractive effort: 20,530 lbf (91 kN)
Career
- Operators: Great Western Railway
- Class: 3800
- Power class: GWR: C
- Number in class: 40
- Numbers: 3473–82, 3801–30 until Dec 1912; 3800–39 from December 1912
- Official name: County
- Nicknames: Churchward's Rough Riders
- Axle load class: GWR: Red
- Withdrawn: 1930–33
- Disposition: All original locomotives scrapped; one new-build under construction
- Dimensions as built

The Great Western Railway 3800 Class, also known as the County Class, were a class of 4-4-0 steam locomotives for express passenger train work introduced in 1904 in a batch of ten. Two more batches followed in 1906 and 1912 with minor differences. They were designed by George Jackson Churchward, who used standard components to produce a four-coupled version of his Saint Class 4-6-0s.

== Construction ==
The first locomotive, No. 3473 County of Middlesex, was built at Swindon Works in May 1904, with the following nine completed by October 1904. They were initially fitted with parallel-sided copper-capped chimneys, which were soon replaced by tapered cast iron chimneys. The second batch, of twenty, were built between October and December 1906. This batch had tapered cast iron chimneys from the start. A third and last batch of ten were built between December 1911 and February 1912. On these the footplates had curved drop ends at the cab and front bufferbeam. They were also fitted from new with a superheater and top feed. Chimneys were a larger version of the copper-capped type of the first batch.

Coupled wheels had independent springing, without the compensating beams fitted between the axleboxes on Churchward's 4-6-0s. The cylinder block, including the piston valves and smokebox saddle, was constructed from two castings from the same pattern, bolted back to back, each casting containing one half of the saddle. The cab, boiler and coupled wheels were attached to plate frames. The cylinder block was carried on two bar frames, bolted to the front end of the plate frames. The piston valves were driven by Stephenson valve gear. The class were fitted with the Standard No. 4 boiler. One locomotive, No. 3805 County Kerry was fitted with a smaller Standard No. 2 boiler between November 1907 and May 1909.

Table of orders and numbers
Year	Quantity	Lot No.	Works Nos.	Locomotive numbers	Notes
1904	10	149	2056–2065	3473–3482	renumbered 3800, 3831–3839 in 1912
1906	20	165	2209–2228	3801–3820	
1911–12	10	184	2416–2425	3821–3830	

== Operation ==
They were the last new GWR 4-4-0 design and by far the most modern, with inside frames and outside cylinders. They were designed as a part of Churchward's standardisation plan, but were found to have a front end too powerful for the wheel arrangement and all were withdrawn by the early 1930s. They were designed, in part, for the Hereford to Shrewsbury LNWR line over which the GWR had running powers, but on which they were expressly forbidden to use 4-6-0 locomotives. The 4-4-0 Counties were in effect a shortened GWR 2900 Class, providing engines powerful enough for the trains but with the requisite four-coupled wheels.

The key components were all proven but the combination was somewhat poor, and perhaps the least successful of Churchward's designs. From the outset they were found to be rough riders but were otherwise effective locos. All other GWR 4-4-0s were inside-cylindered and none had a piston stroke greater than 26 inches, whereas the 'County' had a 30-inch stroke driving a meagre 8 ft 6 ft wheelbase.

The County Class used the same cylinders and motion as Churchward's six-coupled locomotives and required the same mass to counterbalance the reciprocating parts of the motion. However the weight required had to be divided between four driving wheels rather than six. The heavier balance weights produced a high level of wheel hammer blow; at six revolutions per second the hammer blow was 8 tons, compared with the 3.6 tons of the inside-cylindered City Class and the 6.4 tons of the six-coupled Saint Class. The left hand trailing axleboxes often developed hammering, which was caused by the amount of counterbalancing used.

This class were subject to the 1912 renumbering of GWR 4-4-0 locomotives, which saw the Bulldog class gathered together in the series 3300–3455, and other types renumbered out of that series. The County Class took numbers 3800–3839.

3833 County of Dorset was the first to be withdrawn, in February 1930. By the end of 1933 all had gone, the last survivor being No. 3834 County of Somerset, withdrawn in November of that year.

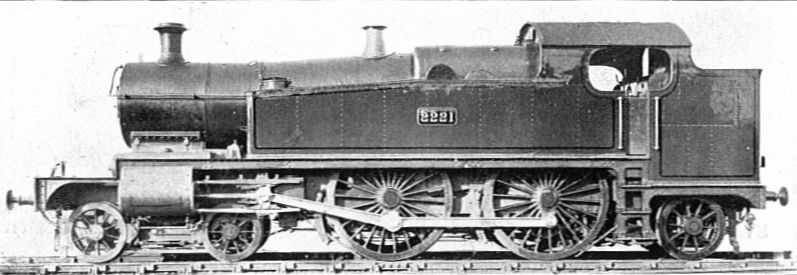
County Tank 2221

They were also the basis for the 'County Tank' GWR 2221 Class design, a 4-4-2T using the same basic design as the County but with a smaller and lighter boiler, and the replacement of the tender by the addition of side tanks, bunker and trailing axle.

Numbers		Name
First	Second (1912)	Name
3473	3800	County of Middlesex
3801	3801	County Carlow
3802	3802	County Clare
3803	3803	County Cork
3804	3804	County Dublin
3805	3805	County Kerry
3806	3806	County Kildare
3807	3807	County Kilkenny
3808	3808	County Limerick
3809	3809	County Wexford
3810	3810	County Wicklow
3811	3811	County of Bucks
3812	3812	County of Cardigan
3813	3813	County of Carmarthen
3814	3814	County of Chester
3815	3815	County of Hants
3816	3816	County of Leicester
3817	3817	County of Monmouth
3818	3818	County of Radnor
3819	3819	County of Salop
3820	3820	County of Worcester
3821	3821	County of Bedford
3822	3822	County of Brecon
3823	3823	County of Carnarvon
3824	3824	County of Cornwall
3825	3825	County of Denbigh
3826	3826	County of Flint
3827	3827	County of Gloucester
3828	3828	County of Hereford
3829	3829	County of Merioneth
3830	3830	County of Oxford
3474	3831	County of Berks
3475	3832	County of Wilts
3476	3833	County of Dorset
3477	3834	County of Somerset
3478	3835	County of Devon
3479	3836	County of Warwick
3480	3837	County of Stafford
3481	3838	County of Glamorgan
3482	3839	County of Pembroke

== New Build – 3840 County of Montgomery ==
No members of the class were preserved. However, the Great Western Society took the decision to create the next locomotive in the sequence, 3840 County of Montgomery. The project has been handed over to the Churchward County Trust and 3840 will be based at the Didcot Railway Centre following its construction at Tyseley Locomotive Works in Birmingham. The locomotive is being built with both new parts, such as the driving wheels which have been cast using the pattern created for Saint Class 2999 Lady of Legend, and recycled standard parts recovered from former Barry scrapyard locomotives including the Standard No. 4 Boiler, the pony truck wheel set, two pony truck axle boxes, four horn guides and two eccentric sheaves from 5205 Class 2-8-0T 5227, and four driving wheel axle boxes from 2800 Class 2-8-0 2861.

== Models ==
Hornby Railways manufacture a model of the 38xx in OO gauge. 3mm Scale Model Railways manufacture a model kit of the 38xx in TT gauge. Hornby manufactured between 1931-1936 electric and clockwork tin-plate models of the 3821 County of Bedford in 0 gauge.

== See also ==
- List of GWR standard classes with two outside cylinders
