= Didcot Railway Centre =

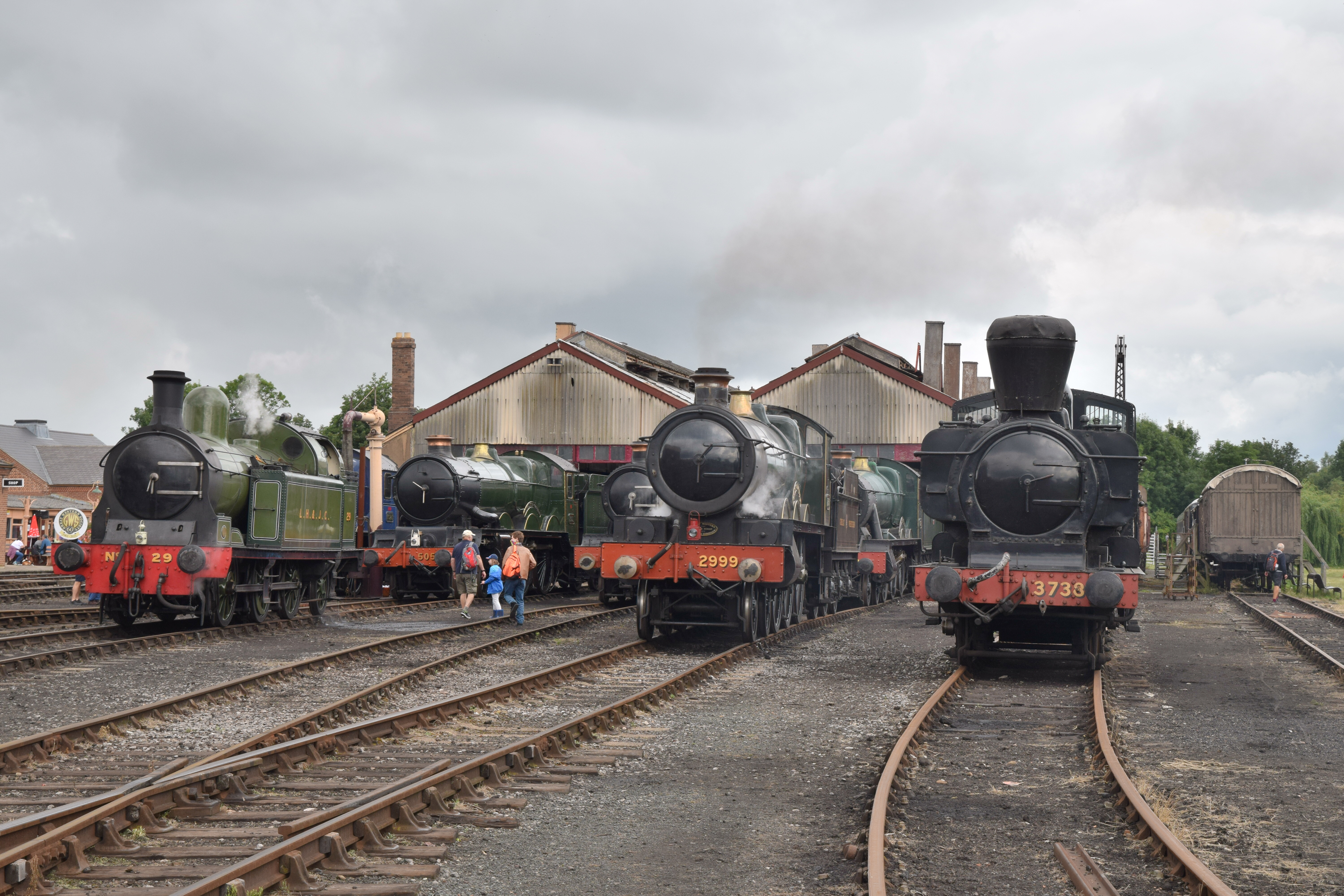
- Locomotives 5051, 29 (visiting), 2999, 3738, and others sitting in front of the engine shed.

- Location in Oxfordshire
- Established: 1967
- Location: Didcot, Oxfordshire, England
- Coordinates: 51°36′49″N 1°14′41″W
- Type: Operational Railway museum
- Key holdings: GWR 6000 Class No.6023 King Edward II; GWR 4073 Class No.4079 Pendennis Castle; GWR Firefly Class Firefly
- Owner: Great Western Society (site leased from Network Rail)
- Public transit access: Didcot Parkway
- Website: Didcot Railway Centre

Didcot Railway Centre is a railway museum and preservation engineering site in Didcot, Oxfordshire, England. The site was formerly a Great Western Railway engine shed and locomotive stabling point.

== Background ==
The founders and commercial backers of the Great Western Railway (GWR) supported Isambard Kingdom Brunel's scheme to develop an integrated railway and steamship service which allowed trans-Atlantic passengers and freight quicker passage between London and New York City. However, whilst backing the scheme the railway had to make a profit, and so it took a number of detours and added both mainline and branch line traffic to increase its domestic earnings. This earned the railway the nickname The Great Way Round from its detractors.

Whilst the route from London Paddington to Reading was relatively straight, the then obvious most direct route to Bristol would have taken the railway further south, thus avoiding both Didcot and Swindon. However, passenger and freight traffic both to and from Oxford and onwards to the West Midlands in part dictated a more northerly route. Also, Brunel had originally planned to cut through Savernake Forest near Marlborough, Wiltshire to Bristol, but the Marquess of Ailesbury, who owned the land, objected – having previously objected to part of the Kennet and Avon Canal running through his estate (see Bruce Tunnel). With the railway needing to run near to a canal at its midpoint – as it was cheaper to transport coal for trains along canals at this time – and with the need for the branch northwards to Cheltenham via Stroud, Swindon was the next logical choice for the junction (and later railway works), 20 miles (32 km) north of the original route. This dictated that the Oxford junction also be moved northwards, and hence via Didcot. The Great Western Railway built the first rail line through Didcot in 1839 and opened its first station in 1844.

=== Construction ===
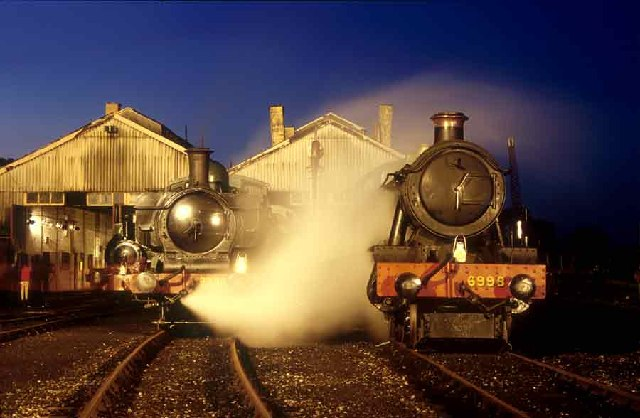
Didcot Railway Centre, Oct 2001

Due to the technical operational difficulties of running and maintaining a mainline service from London to Bristol, as well as the need for servicing locomotives going to Oxford, Didcot became an obvious midpoint maintenance and stabling point. Having built a timber-framed 7 ft 1/4 in (2,140 mm) broad gauge shed on the original site during the railway's development west in the 1800s, in June 1932 a new steel-framed half-brick 4-road through shed (210 by 67 feet [64.01 m × 20.42 m]), was completed by the GWR under the Loans and Guarantees Act (1929). With shed code DID, it also included a repair shop (84 by 42 feet [25.6 m × 12.8 m]), coaling stage (43 by 36 feet [13.1 m × 11.0 m]), sand furnace (10 by 10 feet [3.0 m × 3.0 m]) and 65 feet (20 m) turntable and associated offices (210 by 15 feet [64 m × 5 m]). During World War II, a standard steel-framed with corrugated iron-panel covered ash shelter was erected: this was dismantled in early GWS days.

=== Operations ===
After World War II, the site remained virtually unchanged during the nationalised ownership of British Railways (BR), but for taking on the new code of 81E. The standard allocation of locomotives remained the same, with Halls, Dukedogs and Panniers making up the bulk of the depot's fleet.

=== Closure ===
With the replacement of steam with diesel traction under the Modernisation Plan, the shed became redundant and was closed in June 1965.

== Formation and site lease ==
The Great Western Society (GWS) was offered the use of the former Didcot locomotive depot, taking it over in 1967. In the 1970s, the society negotiated a long-term lease with BR which was to expire in 2019. But this was subject to a six-month termination clause which could force the GWS to quit the site, and which could be operated at any point in time by lease-holder Network Rail (NR).

In an attempt to secure a long-term future for the society, in 2002 the GWS opened negotiations with NR to either purchase the site or extend the lease. In a letter dated May 2007, NR informed the GWS that they were prepared to sell the site subject to Office of Rail Regulation (ORR) approval. It had been thought the site could be subject to need as a depot, either due to: the rebuilding of Reading station; a Crossrail project depot; or the Intercity Express Programme. After expressing some concern at the slow speed of negotiations at the GWS annual meeting in September 2008, NR wrote to the GWS to advise that the site was no longer available for sale, and although a lease extension was still on offer it was still subject to the previous six-month termination clause. The GWS then wrote to their local MP Ed Vaizey, and placed any long-term development plans on hold. As of 6 October 2011 Richard Croucher (Chairman of the Great Western Society) signed a new 50-year lease with Network Rail, therefore preserving the site for at least another 50 years.

== Museum and railway centre ==
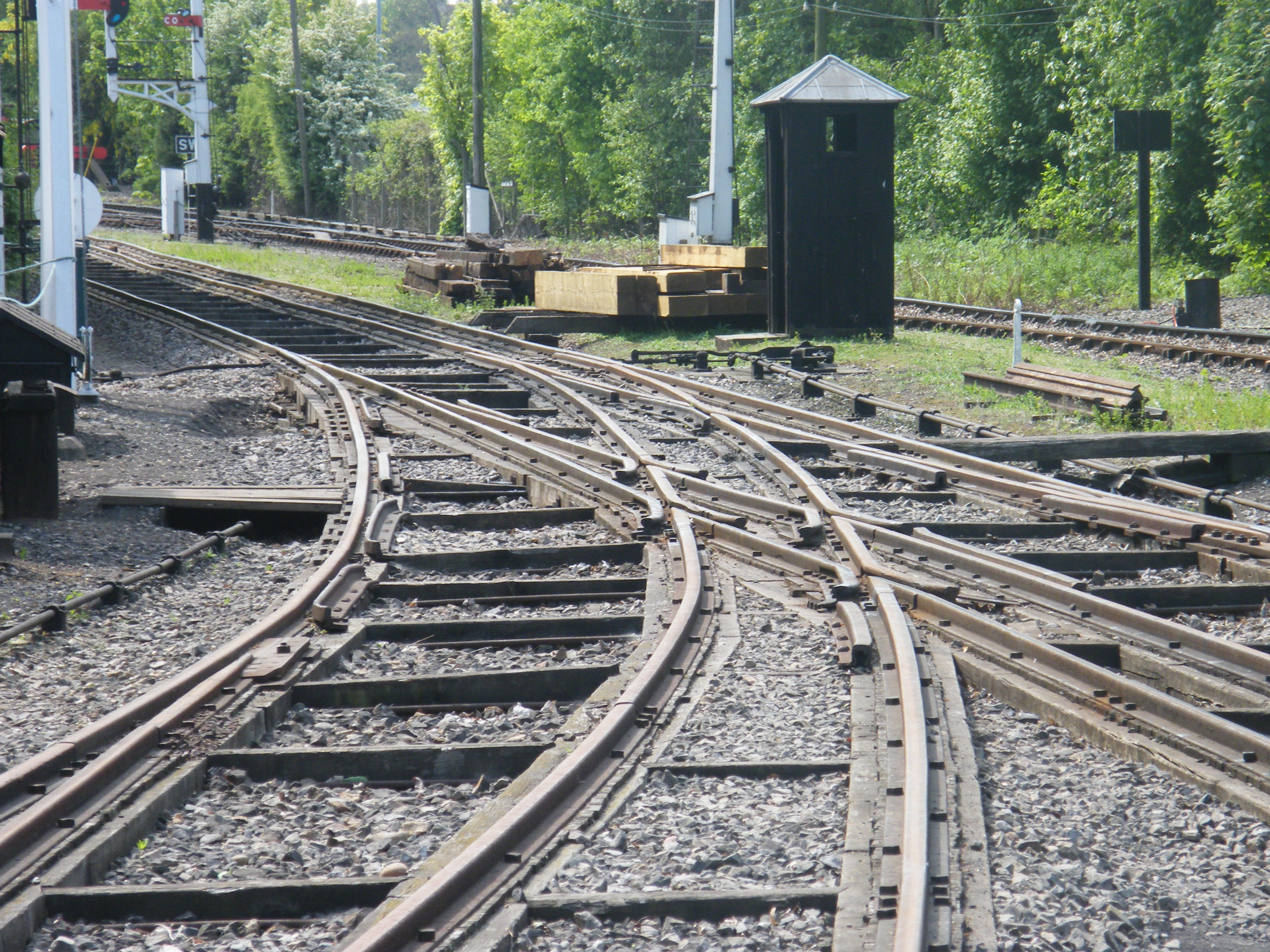
Reconstructed mixed-gauge, 1,435 mm (4 ft 8 1/2 in) standard gauge / 7 ft 1/4 in (2,140 mm) track

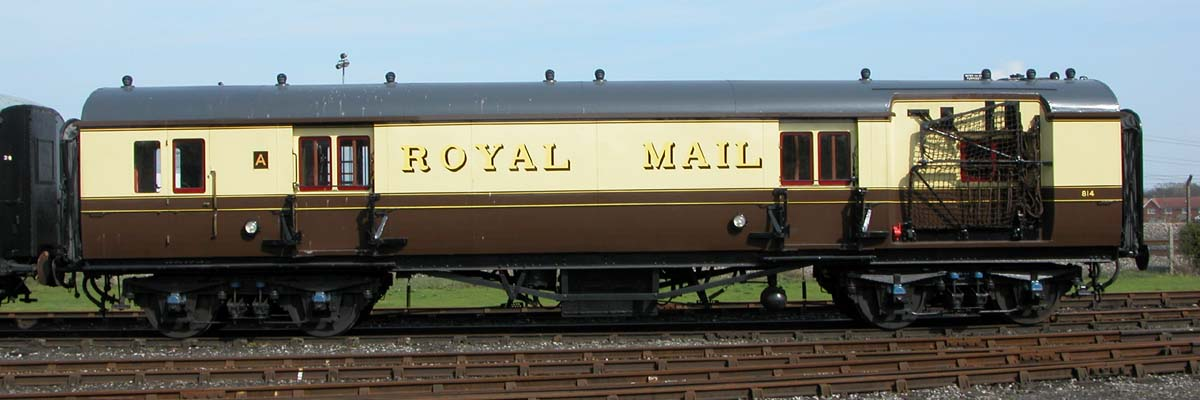
Travelling Post Office

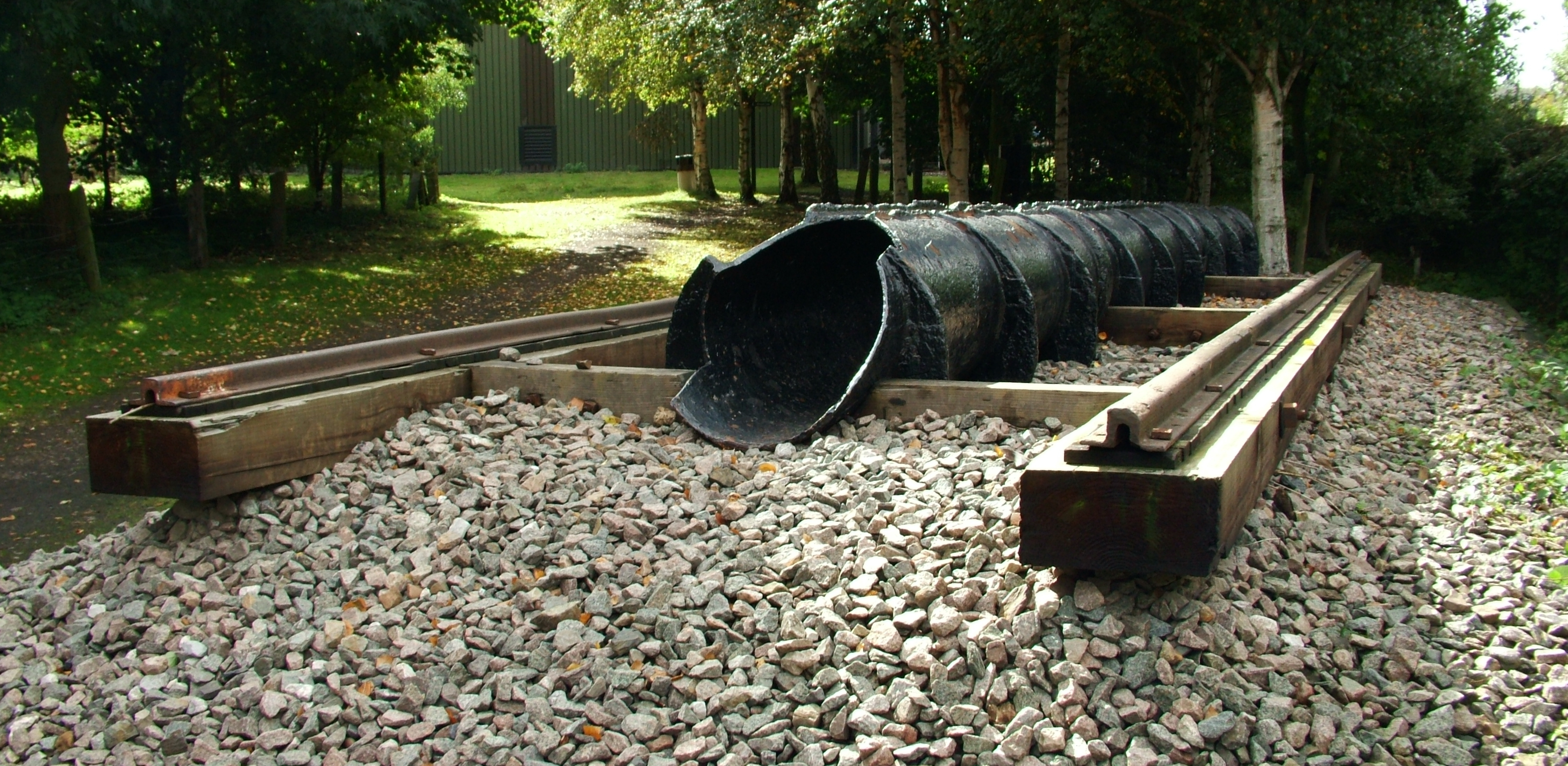
A reconstruction of Isambard Kingdom Brunel's atmospheric railway, using a segment of the original piping

Today the GWS have developed the site, which still retains many of the original GWR buildings and features, as both a working steam locomotive and railway museum, engineering maintenance centre, and railway line offering short rides to visitors.

Access via Didcot Parkway station brings the visitor into the southern end of the site, at the start of the ramp coal wagons would take up to the coaling stage. Beyond this is the original 1932 four-road engine shed, and beyond this the original repair shed and 1988 constructed locomotive works, both of which have restricted access due to safety concerns. Beyond this lies a Ransomes & Rapier 70 feet (21 m) turntable, originally built for the Southern Railway at Southampton Docks, installed in the original pit.

The centre regularly holds events such as steam and diesel railcar days. Members of the Great Western Society have been active in the preservation of locomotives and rolling stock. Certain 'new-build' projects to create locomotives that did not escape wholesale scrapping have also been undertaken at Didcot, such as the completed Firefly locomotive, a 'Saint' class (using a 'Hall' class chassis and boiler) and a 'County' class locomotive (using a 'Hall' class chassis and an LMS '8F' class boiler).

There is a small relics museum and archive on site, operated by the Great Western Trust.

The Railway Centre has been used as a period film set and has featured in productions including Anna Karenina, Sherlock Holmes: A Game of Shadows, and The Elephant Man.

=== Running lines ===
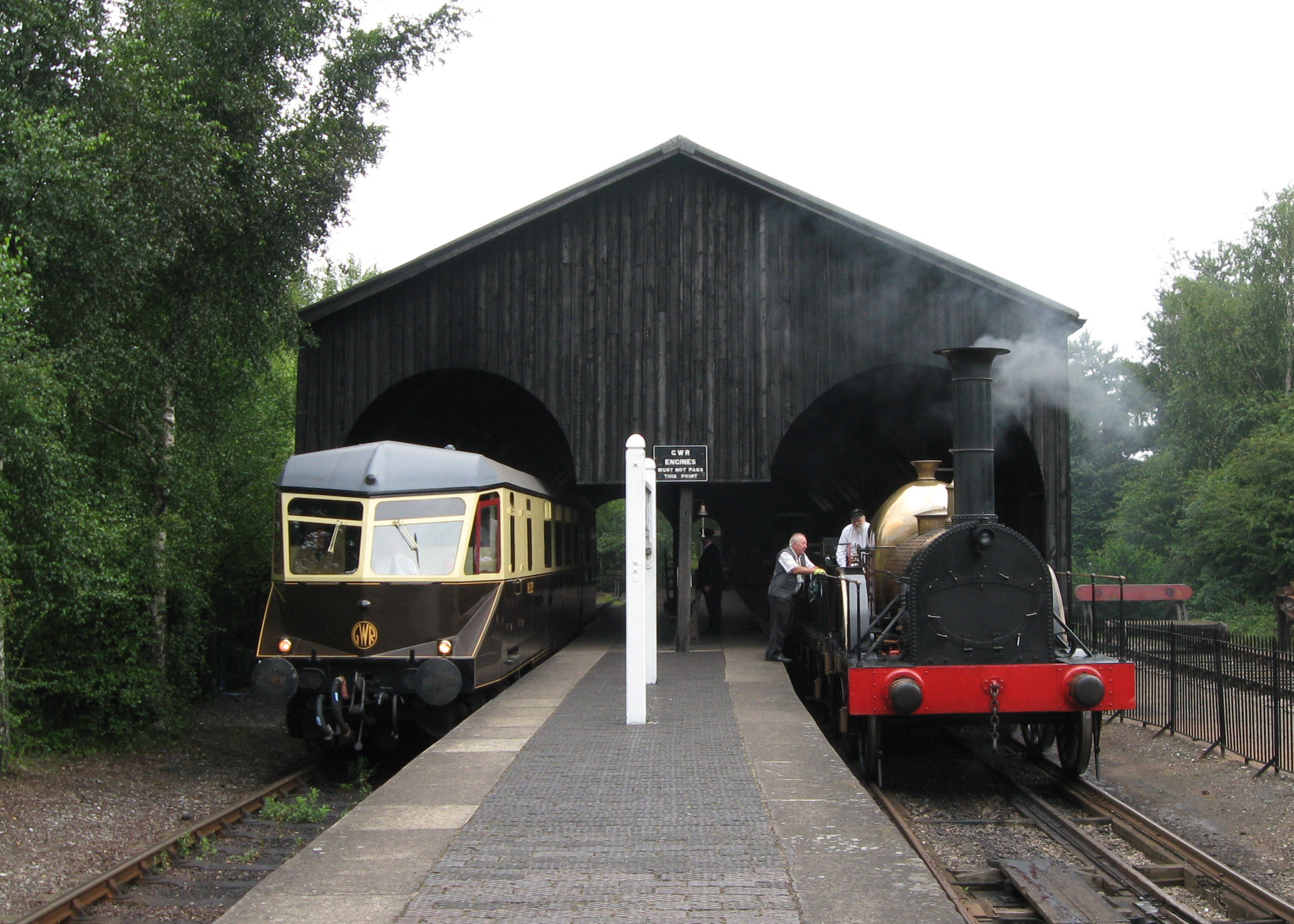
The former broad-gauge transfer shed is now used as a station building on the branch line

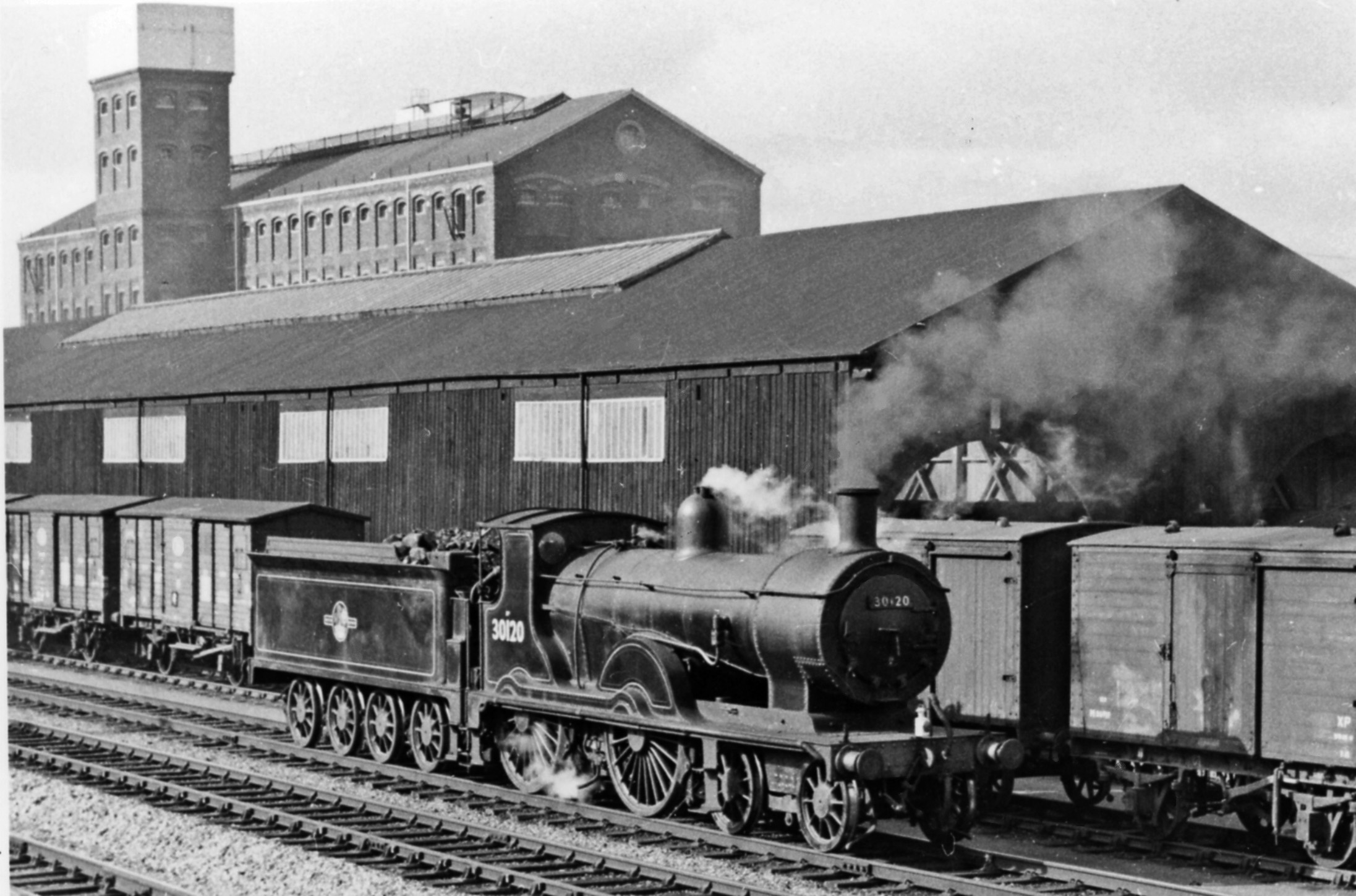
The broad-gauge transfer shed in its original location, with the provender store behind

There are three short lengths of running track, each with a station at both ends:

==== Branchline ====
This starts at a typical GWR wayside halt, named Didcot Halt, and runs north on the western edge of the site to a platform, named Burlescombe Station, at the transshipment shed. Dating from broad gauge days, the shed was used for transferring goods from broad to "narrow" (i.e. 4 ft 8 1/2 in or 1,435 mm standard gauge) rolling stock and vice versa. It was moved to its present location carefully from its original site nearby.

==== Broad Gauge Line ====
The broad gauge line of 7 ft 1/4 in (2,140 mm) starts from the transshipment shed, and runs halfway back down the branchline. The 2005 replica GWR Fire Fly is housed within the shed when not running

==== Mainline ====
Starting from the Main Line Platform opposite the site entrance, using a pre-fabricated concrete station platform from Eynsham, this runs on the eastern edge of the site to a newly built platform, named Oxford Road Station, near the transshipment shed. The reconstruction of the Brunel-designed building from Heyford station on this platform has been commenced.

== Access ==
The railway centre is entirely surrounded by active railway lines and has no road connection of any kind. Public access is on foot from a subway at Didcot Parkway station, which links the centre by rail to London and much of southern and central England. Wheelchair and pram access was difficult due to the presence of a flight of concrete steps on Network Rail property. To comply fully with the Disability Discrimination Act, the Great Western Society constructed a ramped access in 2023–24.

== Collection ==
=== Steam locomotives ===
Class	Number (& Name)	Image	Status	Notes
Robert Stephenson and Hawthorns 0-4-0ST	No.1; Bonnie Prince Charlie		Static Display	Built 1949 for dockside shunting. Awaiting overhaul. Painted in lined light green livery.
George England 0-4-0WT	No.5 Shannon		Static Display	Built 1857, latterly owned by the Wantage Tramway. Steamed in 1970s but examination indicated that too much historic material would need replacing to return it to working condition, so remains on static display in 1920s red livery.
GWR Steam Railmotor	No.93		Static Display	Built 1908. Restoration completed in 2012. Often runs with trailer carriage No. 92. Boiler ticket expired in 2021.
GWR 1000 Class	1014; County of Glamorgan		Under Construction	1946 design. Replica using original GWR and LMS locomotive components.
Kitson & Co. 0-4-0ST	No.1338		Static Display	Built 1898. Ex-Cardiff Railway.
GWR 1340 Class	1340; Trojan		Operational.	Built 1897. Ex-Alexandra (Newport and South Wales) Docks and Railway. Painted in GWR green livery. Returned to steam in 2021 after an offsite overhaul.
GWR 1361 Class	1363		Under Overhaul	Built 1910. Undergoing a major overhaul with significant work being undertaken on both the boiler and frames.
GWR 1400 Class	1466		Operational	Built 1936. This was the first locomotive bought by the society. Returned to steam in 2025 following overhaul.
Hunslet 0-6-0T	No. 2409; King George		Operational	Built 1942 as 0-6-0ST for colliery use; rebuilding as 0-6-0T at Didcot completed 2022.
GWR 2900 Class	2999; Lady of Legend		Operational	1902/06 design. Completed at Didcot 2019 using components from No. 4942 Maindy Hall (1929). Runs as a 4-6-0 but intended to run as a 4-4-2 for periods of time.
GWR 5700 Class	3650		Under Overhaul	Built 1939. Ten-yearly overhaul began in 2018.
GWR 5700 Class	3738		Static Display	Built 1937. Out of service from 2013 due to firebox problems.
GWR 2884 Class	3822		Static Display	Built 1940. Appeared in the Queen music video Breakthru. Withdrawn from service in 2010.
GWR 4073 Class	4079; Pendennis Castle		Operational	Built 1924. Boiler ticket expires 2031. This locomotive was repatriated from Australia in 2000 after spending 22 years in the country.
GWR 5101 Class	4144		Operational	Built 1946.
GWR 4073 Class	5051; Earl Bathurst		Static Display	Built 1936. Currently carrying its former name, Drysllwyn Castle.
GWR 5205 Class	5227		Static Display	Built 1924. One of the Barry Ten, it was purchased in 2010 to provide parts for the construction of the new-build GWR 4700 Class No. 4709. After donating its axleboxes to the project, it moved to Didcot in 2013 following storage at a private site. Currently on display in ex-scrapyard condition as a reminder of the challenge that preservationists had to conquer. The Standard No. 4 Boiler, pony truck wheel set, 2 pony truck axleboxes, 4 horn guides and 2 eccentric sheaves are being transferred to the new build Churchward County GWR 3800 Class 3840 "County of Montgomery". The remainder of the locomotive has been sold to an individual who intends to restore the locomotive to working order, including manufacture of parts to replace those removed for use in new build projects. The locomotive is expected to remain at Didcot Railway Centre.
GWR 4300 Class	5322		Static Display	Built 1917. Used by Railway Operating Division in France during World War I. Withdrawn in 2014 due to boiler problems.
GWR 4575 Class	5572		Static Display	Built 1929.
GWR 4900 Class	5900; Hinderton Hall		Static Display	Built 1931.
GWR 6000 Class	6023; King Edward II		Static Display	Built 1930. Returned to steam in 2010 after completion of a lengthy restoration from scrapyard condition, was originally purchased as a spares donor for sister engine 6024 King Edward I. Boiler ticket expired in 2020. BR blue livery.
GWR 6100 Class	6106		Static Display	Built 1931.
GWR 5600 Class	6697		Static Display	Built 1928. Only member of the 5600 class to be purchased directly from British Railways for preservation.
GWR 6959 Class	6998; Burton Agnes Hall		Static Display	Built 1949.
GWR 7200 Class	7202		Under Restoration	Built 1934.
GWR 7800 Class	7808; Cookham Manor		Static Display	Built 1938.
GWR Firefly Class	Fire Fly		Static Display	Built 2005 as working replica of 1840 Broad Gauge 2-2-2.
GWR Iron Duke Class	Iron Duke		Static Display	Built 1985 as working replica of early Broad Gauge 4-2-2. On loan from National Railway Museum.
Breakdown Crane	RS1054		Under restoration	Built 1930. Ex LMS Cowans Sheldon 50 ton steam crane.
Steam Crane	23059		For restoration	Built 1954 by Thomas Smith and Sons (Rodley) Ltd, Leeds.

=== Diesel locomotives ===
Including other non-steam powered vehicles

Class	Number (&Name)	Image	Status	Notes
GWR Railcar	No.22		Operational	Built at Swindon in 1940.
Hunslet	DL 26		Operational	Built by Hunslet of Leeds in 1957 for the National Coal Board and arrived at Didcot in 1978. It was the only diesel shunter at the site for many years until the arrival of 08604. Most of its duties tend to be light shunting. Repainted 2023.
British Rail Class 08	08604; Phantom		Operational	Built at Derby Works as D3771, allocated to: Longsight (9A) June 1959; Stockport Edgeley (9B) July 1959; Longsight (9A) April 1965, unofficially named Ardwick; renumbered 08604 February 1974; stored Swindon Works 1981; Tyseley TMD February 1984, unofficially renamed Javelin, officially then named Phantom; Bescot November 1988; Derby Etches Park November 1992; withdrawn in July 1993. Sold to GWS and moved to DRC 1994.
British Rail Class 14 diesel-hydraulic	D9516		Operational	Built at Swindon in 1964. After a post-BR industrial career, bought for preservation by Gerald Boden and based at Great Central Railway and then Nene Valley Railway. Bought from the Wensleydale Railway in 2014.
British Rail Class 52 diesel hydraulic	D1023; Western Fusilier		Static Display	Built at Swindon in 1963. In 1973 it became the final diesel hydraulic to receive a general repair at Swindon Works. Upon withdrawal in 1977, it was preserved by the National Railway Museum. Arrived at Didcot in January 2023 on a 5 year loan from York.
GWR 18000 gas turbine	18000		Static Display	Built by Brown, Boveri & Cie in Switzerland in 1949 to GWR order. Arrived 29 July 2011. Owned by Pete Waterman
British Railways Wickham trolley	B42W		Operational	Built 1956. Type 27A Mk III Permanent Way Gang and inspection trolley.
Diesel Crane	CD24		Static Display	Built 1949 by Thomas Smith and Sons (Rodley) Ltd, Leeds.

=== Other rolling stock ===
The GWS has an extensive supporting collection of GWR rolling stock, including three of the GWR Super Saloons that serviced the boat train traffic to Plymouth. In addition it has some vehicles for staff and maintenance use.

==== Carriages ====
Type	Number (&Name)	Image	Status	Notes
Churchward Auto Trailer	No. 92		Restored to run with Steam Railmotor 93.	Built at Swindon, 1912.
Collett Full Brake	No. 111		Stored	Built at Swindon, 1934
Collett Auto Trailer	No. 190		Operational, subject to works attention.	Built at Swindon, 1933.
Hawksworth Auto Trailer	No. 231		Operational, subject to works attention.	Built at Swindon, 1951
Bristol & Exeter Railway Broad Gauge Coach	No. 250		Stored	Built between 1852 & 1892. Enough of body remains to reconstruct a small compartment.
Dean 4w 1st 2nd Composite	No. 290		Restoration began in 2011.	Built at Swindon, 1902
Hawkesworth Passenger Brake Van	No. 316		Static display	Built at Swindon, 1950
Hawksworth Passenger Brake Van	No. 333		In use as sales vehicle.	Built at Swindon, 1951. Acquired from Gloucestershire and Warwickshire Railway.
Dean 4w Brake Third	No. 416			Built at Swindon, 1891
Collett Third	No. 536		Operational	Built at Swindon, 1940
Dean Tricomposite	No. 820		Static display	Built at Swindon, 1887
Dean Tricomposite	No. 824		Stored	Built at Swindon, 1887
Dean Full Brake	No. 933		Operational (by 2019)	Built at Swindon, 1898
Dean 4-Wheel Third	No. 975		Restored	Built at Swindon, 1902. Restoration complete. Restored to recreate a Victorian train.
Collett Third	No. 1111		Stored	Built at Swindon, 1938
Medical Officers' Coach, originally Churchward Passenger Brake Van - Toplight	No. 1159		Stored	Built at Swindon, 1925.
Collett Full Brake	No. 1184		Under restoration	Built at Swindon, 1930. Last bow-ended full brake
Collett 'Excursion' Third	No. 1289		Under overhaul	Built at Swindon, 1937
Dean 8 Compartment Third Clerestory	No. 1357		Awaiting major restoration in carriage shed.	Built at Swindon, 1903.
Dean Third	No. 1941		Operational.	Built at Swindon, 1901
Dean Composite Diner	No. 1580		Stored	Built at Swindon, 1903
Hawksworth Brake Third	No. 2202		Operational.	Built by Metro-Cammell, 1950
Hawksworth Brake Third	No. 2232		Static display	Built by Metro-Cammell, 1950. Initially restored as a locker room for staff.
Dean 6-wheel Family Saloon	No. 2511		Operational	Built at Swindon, 1894. Was rescued and preserved from a house and placed on the underframe of a GWR 6-wheel van.
Churchward “Dreadnought” 9 Compartment Third	No. 3299		Under restoration	Built at Birmingham Railway Carriage and Wagon Company, 1905. One of the first coaches acquired by the Great Western Society.
Churchward Non-Corridor Brake Third	No. 3755		Operational	Built at Swindon, 1921.
Churchward Non-Corridor Brake Third	No. 3756		Stored	Built at Swindon, 1921.
Churchward Toplight Corridor Third	No. 3963		Stored	Built at Swindon, 1919.
Collett Third - Bow Ended	No. 4553		Stored	Built at Swindon, 1925.
Collett 8 Compartment Bow-Ended Third	No. 5085		Stored	Built at Swindon, 1928.
Collett Brake Third	No. 5787		Stored	Built at Swindon, 1933.
Collett All Third	No. 5952		Stored	Built at Swindon, 1935.
Dean 6-Wheel Tricomposite	No. 6824		Stored on an LMS 6w underframe.	Built in 1887. Was a convertible coach, originally built for the Broad Gauge.
Collett Composite	No. 7285		Stored	Built at Swindon, 1941.
Collett Composite	No. 7313		Stored.	Built at Swindon, 1940
Collett Brake Composite	No. 7371		Operational	Built at Swindon, 1941.
Hawksworth Brake Composite	No. 7372		Under overhaul	Built at Swindon, 1948.
Collett Brake Composite	No. 7976		Stored	Built at Swindon, 1923.
Collett Special Saloon	No. 9002		Static display	Built at Swindon, 1940. Used by Winston Churchill, General Eisenhower and the Royal Family during WWII.
Hawksworth First Class Sleeping Car	No. 9083		Static display	Built at Swindon, 1951.
Collett Super Saloon	No. 9112 Queen Mary		Stored	Built at Swindon, 1932.
Collett Super Saloon	No. 9113 Prince of Wales		Under restoration	Built at Swindon, 1932.
Collett Super Saloon	No. 9118 Princess Elizabeth		Stored	Built at Swindon, 1932.
Dean Composite Diner	No. 9520			No current restoration plans.
Collett 'Centenary Diner'	No. 9635		Static display	Built at Swindon, 1935.

==== Broad Gauge replica carriages ====
Type	Number (&Name)	Image	Status	Notes
Six-Wheeled, Second Class, Broad Gauge Covered Carriage	BG1		Operational	Built at BR Cardiff Cathays in 1984 to 19th cent. design.
Six-Wheeled, Third Class, Broad Gauge Open Carriage	BG2		Operational	Built at BR Cardiff Cathays in 1984 to 19th cent. design.

==== Non-passenger-carrying coaching stock ====
Type	Number (& Name)	Image	Status	Notes
Tool Van	No. 1		In use as staff tool van.	Built in 1908 at Swindon.
Tool Van	No. 47		Stored under cover with 9083 and 2232, used as a stores van.	Built in 1908 at Swindon.
Tool Van	No. 56		In use as staff tool van.	Built in 1908 at Swindon.
Churchward 'Monster' Carriage Truck	No. 484			Built at Swindon, 1913.
Churchward 'Python'	No. 565		In use as a workshop and stores vehicle.	Built at Swindon, 1914.
Travelling Post Office	No. 814	GWR TPO 814 Brake Stowage Van Didcot Railway Centre	Not currently operational.	Built at Swindon, 1940.
Collett 'Siphon G'	No. 2796		Restored. Operational	Built at Swindon, 1937.
Six-Wheel Milk Tank	S4409		Operational	Built in 1931 as four wheeler. Rebuilt in 1937 as six wheeler. Chassis ex-Southern Railway. Most recently painted in Co-operative Wholesale Society green livery with lettering "MILK C.W.S SERVICE".
Special Cattle Van	No. 752		Restored	Built in 1952 at Ashford. Diagram W17.
'Bloater' Fish Van	No. 2671		Restored	Built in 1925 at Swindon.
'Fruit C' Van	No. 2862		Part restored	Built in 1939 at Swindon.
'Fruit D' Van	No. 2913			Built in 1941 at Swindon.
'Fruit' Van	No. 47886		Operational.	Built in 1892 at Swindon. Dean brake system.
'Mink G' fitted goods van	No. 112843		Restored.	Built in 1931 at Swindon.

==== Wagons ====
Type	Number (& Name)	Image	Status	Notes
Tar Tank Wagon	No. 1		Requires re-restoration	Built in 1898.
6w Drinking Water Tank	No. 101		Stored	Built in 1948.
Department Mess Van	No. 263		In staff use	Built in 1905. Rebuilt by BR from a GWR 25t brake van No. 56867.
Oil Tank Wagon	No. 795		Restored	Built in 1912 by Hurst Nelson. Most recently painted as Anglo American Oil Co Ltd - Pratts Perfection Spirit. Previously restored as Royal Daylight No. 745.
'Rotank' flat wagon carrying trailer tank	No. 3030		Restored	Built in 1947 at Swindon. Most recently painted as Simonds Beer tank.
Goods Van	No. 516673		Restored, used for storage	Ex-LMS. Purchased from MoD Bicester as 4166 for storage by the locomotive department. Stored beside locomotive workshop at the end of line of unrestored stock.
Goods Van	No. 517791		Restored, used for storage	Ex-LMS. Purchased from MoD Bicester as 4167 for storage by the locomotive department. Stored beside locomotive workshop at the end of line of unrestored stock.
Four wheel 7-plank mineral wagon	No. 10153		Restored	Built by Gloucester RCW. Ex-Taff Vale Railway, only surviving TVR wagon. Most likely 1880s because of the handbrake gear.
Iron Mink	No. 11152		Restored, non-operational	Built in 1900 at Swindon.
"Toad" Brake Van	No. 17447		Part dismantled, stored under tarpaulin	Built in 1940 at Swindon.
4 wheel 5-plank open wagon	No. 18553		Operational	Built in 1927 by Sheffield C&W.
"Open A" open wagon	No. 19818		Restored	Built in 1917 at Swindon.
'Mite' Single Bolsters	Nos. 32337 & 32338		Non-operational	Built in 1881 at Swindon.
'Coral A' crated glass wagon	No. 41723		Awaiting restoration	Built in 1908 at Swindon.
20/21ton Loco Coal wagon	No. 63066		Restored	Built in 1946 at Swindon.
'Pollen E'	Nos 84997-85000		Restored, on loan from National Railway Museum	Built in 1909 at Swindon.
'Macaw B' bogie bolster wagon	No. 70335		Restored	Built in 1939 at Swindon.
'Crocodile F' bogie well trolley	No. 41934		Operational	Built in 1908 at Swindon as Crocodile G, modified 1909 as Crocodile F, Diagram C12. Captured by German forces at Calais, 1940. Now rare.
'Hydra D' machinery wagon	No. 42193		Stored in open	Built in 1917 at Swindon. Now rare.
Grain Wagon	No. 42239		Stored under tarpaulin awaiting re-restoration	Built in 1927 at Swindon.
'Loriot L' machinery wagon	No. 42271		Operational	Built in 1934 at Swindon.
Creosote Tank Wagon	No. 43949		Stored	Built in 1901 at Swindon.
16ton 'Toad' brake van	No. 56400		Stored amongst other stock in staff use	Built in 1900 at Swindon. Originally 14-ton but later 16-ton. Verandah is covered by inside tarpaulin for protection.
20ton 'Toad' brake van	No. 68684		Restored	Built in 1924 at Swindon.
20ton 'Toad' brake van	No. 950592		Restored	Built in 1950 at Swindon.
Mink A ventilated van	No. 101720		Restored	Built in 1924 at Swindon. "Flour Traffic Only - Return to Wantage Road".
Mink A ventilated van	No. 101836		Restored	Built in 1925 at Swindon.
Mink A ventilated van	No. 145428		Restored	Built in 1944 at Swindon.
Mink A ventilated van	No. W146366		Restored	Built in 1948 at Swindon.
Open A open wagon	No. 117993		Restored	Built in 1930 at Swindon.
Open C open wagon	No. 94835		Restored	Built in 1920 at Swindon.
Open wagon	No. 143698			Built in 1945 at Swindon.
Clay wagon	No. 92943		Restored	Built in 1913 at Swindon.
'Tevan' perishable traffic van	No. 79933		Restored	Built in 1922 at Swindon; converted 1938 from 'Mica B' refrigerated meat van.
'Mica B' Vent-Insul-Meat van	No. 105860		Restored	Built in 1924/5 at Swindon.
"Fruit B" Banana Van	No. 1055993		Restored	Built in 1929 at Swindon.
'Mogo' Motor Car Goods Van	No. 105742		Restored	Built in 1936 at Swindon.
'Asmo' Motor Car Van	No. 116954			Built in 1930 at Swindon.
'Cone' Gunpowder Van	No. 105781		Restored	Built in 1939 at Swindon.
Shunters' truck	No. 100377		Operational	Built in 1953 at Swindon, converted from underframe of 'Mink A' van.
Ballast wagon	No. 80659		Operational	Built in 1936 at Swindon.
Ballast wagon	No. 80668		Operational	Built in 1936 at Swindon.
Ballast wagon	No. 80789		Operational	Built in 1937 at Swindon.
Chaired sleeper wagon	No. 100682 (GWS 91200)		Operational	Built in 1939 at Swindon.
Hand crane and match truck	No. 205		Restored, non-operational	Built in 1894 at Swindon.
Hand crane	No. 537		Restored, non-operational	Built in 1899 at Swindon.
Pooley mobile workshop van	No. 82917		In staff use	Built in 1911 at Swindon as standard covered van; rebuilt 1934 for use of Henry Pooley & Co., the GWR's maintenance contractor for weighbridges.
Demountable beer tank wagon, displayed as aircraft propeller wagon	No. B749039		Restored, non-operational	Built in 1951 at Shildon.
'Oxfit' cattle wagon	No. B893021		Under extensive rebuild for display	Built in 1951 at Swindon. Diagram 1/353. Restored with replacement underframe ex B891708.
2 ft gauge slate wagon	No. 67 (?)		Under restoration	Built in 1903 at Swindon. Used for traffic from Manod to Blaenau Festiniog.

=== Road transport ===
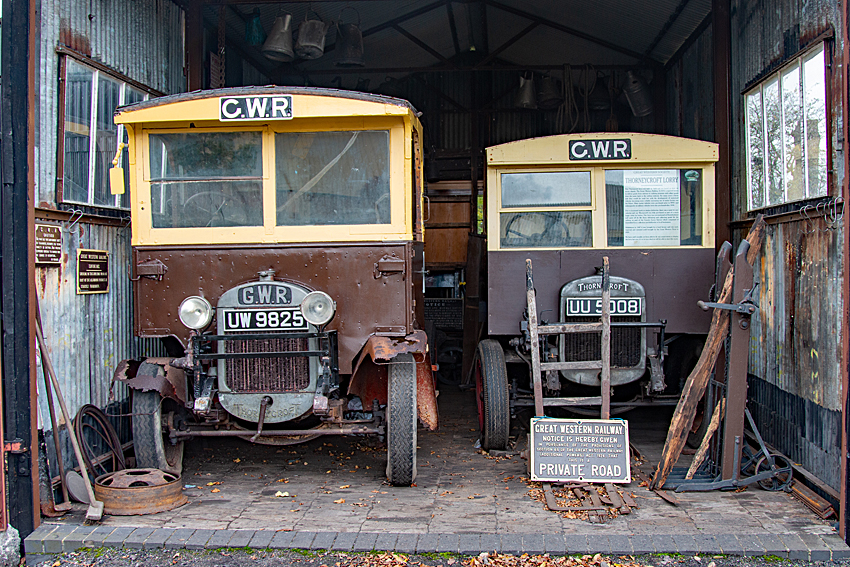
Two ex GWR Thornycroft lorries awaiting restoration

The society has collected a number of road vhicles including two Thornycroft A1 lorries, dating from 1929 and 1930, and the Swindon works fire tender, dating from 1940. The lorries are displayed in a road motor garage recovered from Wantage Road station. There are also a number of horse-drawn vehicles displayed under cover.
