= Rolling stock of the Epping Ongar Railway =

The Epping Ongar Railway is a heritage railway in south-west Essex, England.

== Steam locomotives ==
Steam locomotives include:

Number and name	Origin	Wheel arrangement	Class	Notes	Photograph	Status
4141	GWR	2-6-2T	GWR 5101 Class	Large Prairie 4141 is a GWR 5101 Class locomotive. Built in 1946 it is a medium-sized tank engine with a 2-6-2T wheel arrangement and was designed for suburban and local passenger trains, often seen with GWR and BR suburban coaches. At time of purchase it had recently received a boiler certificate which would see it run for up to ten years, securing the position of steam when the two other residents' boiler tickets had expired. Arrived at the Epping Ongar Railway in 2012, just in time for the "Santa Specials" in December 2012. It is out of service awaiting boiler repairs.		Undergoing Major Overhaul Offsite
4953 "Pitchford Hall"	GWR	4-6-0	GWR "Hall" Class	4953 Pitchford Hall is a 4-6-0 4900 Class Hall locomotive, designed by Charles Collett. Built at Swindon Works in August 1929 at a cost of £4,375, it was allocated to Bristol, Bath Road shed. It carries GWR ‘Transitional’ (1945–48) livery, and is more than capable of handling the gradients of the line. It arrived at the Epping Ongar Railway in 2012, Its boiler ticket expired in 2013 and underwent an overhaul including extensive boiler repair. The locomotive returned to service wearing British Railways lined black livery. When she returned to service the engine was facing east but when came back to the railway after attending the winter gala at its former home Great Central Railway The engine now faces west.		In Traffic
Isabel	ICI Blackley Dyestuffs	0-6-0ST	Hawthorn Leslie	Isabel is a 0-6-0ST by Hawthorn Leslie (works number 3437/1919) These locomotives were mostly used for industrial purposes, and Isabel is an extremely powerful engine, entirely suitable for the steep gradients on the EOR and quite capable of hauling 2-3 coach trains on low-season days. It has an enlarged cab, and so is ideal for training crews and for undertaking "driver experience" courses.Arrived at the Epping Ongar Railway in 2010, Isabel returned to steam on the EOR's Autumn steam gala 2017. Boiler ticket expires 2027.		In Traffic
No. 56	Stewarts & Lloyds	0-6-0ST	Robert Stephenson and Hawthorns	works number 7667/1950		Long Term Restoration
No. 63 "Corby"	Stewarts & Lloyds	0-6-0ST	Robert Stephenson and Hawthorns	works number 7761/1954		Long Term Restoration
No. 1008	VR	4-6-2	VR Class Hr1	works number 157/1948		Derelict

== Diesel locomotives ==
Diesel locomotives include:

Number and name	Origin	Wheel arrangement	Class	Notes	Photograph	Status
47635 "Jimmy Milne"	BR	Co-Co	Class 47	47635 was built in 1964 and entered traffic in the same year. Numbered originally D1606, it was renumbered to 47029 in 1974 and 47635 in 1986. It was Named "Jimmy Milne" in 1987. It was renamed "The Lass O'Ballochmyle" in 2003. It went back to "Jimmy Milne" in preservation at the Swanage Railway in 2008. It is currently in BR Blue with yellow ends.		Operational
D6729 / 37029	BR	Co-Co	Class 37	D6729 was built in 1961 and is resident on Epping Ongar. Following its withdrawal from main-line freight workings, it was restored and repainted to its original colours. It is currently in BR Green and is Operational. On 12 December 2024, the loco was sold to the Pontypool and Blaenavon Railway.		Operational
31438	BR	A1A-A1A	Class 31	31438 was built in 1959. Arrived on the Mid-Norfolk Railway on 24 November 2001, being delivered by road from Carlisle. On arrival at Dereham the original fault book from 31235 was found inside it, both locomotives having been stored at Upperby shed. The locomotive is one of a number fitted with electric train heating. It was delivered new to Ipswich shed as D5557, being transferred to Norwich between 1961 and 1965. It used to carry a unique livery of Brunswick Green with BR arrow symbols. It was listed for sale in late August 2011, was sold to the Epping Ongar Railway by September, and left the MNR after their Autumn Gala. It is currently in BR Blue and is Operational.		Operational
45132 "Peak"	BR	1Co-Co1	Class 45	45132 was built as D22 in 1961 by BR Derby works. It was converted to electric in the 1970s and renumbered 45132. It was withdrawn in 1987, and stored at March in Cambridgeshire. It is currently in BR Blue, Undergoing heavy overhaul.		Undergoing heavy overhaul
D7523 / 25173 "John F. Kennedy"	BR	Bo-Bo	Class 25	D7523 was built by British Railways at Derby in 1965 and started its career at Toton TMD before moving around various London Midland Region sheds such as Willesden, Longsight, and Crewe. It was renumbered 25173 in 1974. It had been based at the Crewe Heritage Centre and on the West Somerset Railway. It arrived at the railway on 7 September 2011 and will be used for engineering and ballast trains and for maintenance and testing of vacuum-braked coaches. It is currently in BR Green, Undergoing heavy overhaul.		Undergoing heavy overhaul offsite
D8001	BR	Bo-Bo	Class 20	20001 was built by English Electric as part of the Pilot Scheme batch of Type 1 locomotives in 1957. It is owned by the Class 20 Preservation Society but resides permanently at North Weald. Currently in all over as built green livery.		Operational
20227	BR	Bo-Bo	Class 20			Operational
D2170	BR	0-6-0DM	Class 03	03170 was delivered to British Railways as D2170 in 1960. It is currently in BR Green, Operational but restricted to yard use.		Operational - restricted to yard use.
03119	BR	0-6-0DM	Class 03	03119 was built in 1959, it is an unusual locomotive as it was modified with a "cut down" cab. It now resides on the EOR as one of the shunting locomotives. It is currently in BR Blue, it is stored out of traffic. On 12 December 2024, the loco was sold to a private owner.		Undergoing Engine Overhaul
08114	BR	0-6-0DM	Class 08	On loan from The Great Central Railway since 2022.		Operational
RH398616	Ruston and Hornsby	0-4-0		RH 398616 of 1956 is out of service. All salvageable parts have been removed and the unit is on static display on a plinth by the main road at Ongar.		Static display at Ongar; non-operational.
DL82	Sentinel Waggon Works	0-6-0				Undergoing Overhaul

== DMUs ==
Origin	Number	Class	Notes	Photograph	Status
British Rail	Unit DMBS 51342 and DMS 51384 Set No -	Class 117	The railway has the two driving cars from what was a three-car Class 117 DMU. There were 127 of this type of vehicle and they were delivered new in 1959 to Southall depot working services between Paddington and the suburbs. They continued to be based in the London area until withdrawal in the 1990s, they arrived at the Railway in 2004. Each coach has two Leyland diesel engines underneath, which drive the wheels mechanically through a fluid flywheel. The driver's cab at each end of the unit means it can be driven from either end, making it ideal when running to Coopersale, and speeding up turn-around times. The windows in the ends mean passengers in either coach get an excellent view of the line ahead or behind and also get to watch the driver in action. The unit ran in an unusual dark blue and white 'EOR' livery until 2007, when it was taken out of service by the new owner when services were suspended. The interior has been refurbished, the unit is receiving attention to the exterior bodywork. DMBS is being restored; DMS is in service twinned with a Class 121 unpowered driving trailer.		DMBS is being restored; DMS operational.
British Rail	W56287 -	Class 121 DTS(Trailer)			Operational

== DEMUs ==
Origin	Number	Class	Notes	Photograph	Status
British Rail	Unit 60110 and 60810 Set No 205205	Class 205	The railway has a 2-car 1957 "Hampshire" Class 205 DEMU 205205. It has been brought back to the South East from the North Yorkshire Moors Railway, and has been restored and again carries passengers. It is the usual motive power for the trains towards Epping. 205205 is the only unit with a corridor connection as it was experimentally converted and modernised by British Rail. The volunteer team at EOR has restored the unit, complete with its commuter-style interior and is now painted in former "Network SouthEast" livery. This ensures the preservation of this period of transport history and is attractive to film and TV companies who require a train of that era. It arrived at the Epping Ongar Railway in 2009. It is Out of Traffic - available as coaching stock.		In Traffic

== EMUs ==
Epping Ongar Railway has a stock of electric multiple unit (EMU) preservation, as the branch used LT's electric stock from 1957 until 1994. There was talk of the line being electrified by the LNER with overhead electrification before the Second World War intervened. Some local lines were electrified quite early on, for example to Shenfield and Southend, and the next generations of EMUs continue to work services on those lines into Liverpool Street.

While the 3rd & 4th conductor rails were removed by the new owners, the line still hosts electric style units, though without the electrification they are hauled by a diesel locomotive. Due to cost, safety issues and legislation it is not possible to re-electrify the branch.

Origin	Number	Class	Notes	Photograph
British Rail	Set 7105, coaches 70235 and 69345	Class 412 / 4-BEP	Built in 1956, arrived at the Epping Ongar Railway in 2016. This unit contains the only surviving Bep buffet car, the unit is running in the refurbished condition. The 2 motor coaches are currently at Eastleigh works for the rebuilding of the brake (guards) compartment in the original position. The trailer coaches are at the Epping Ongar Railway. The trailers are stored under restoration.	-
London Underground	DM 1031	1959 Stock	Built in 1959, withdrawn in 2000 and stored at Morden Depot. Donated in 2018 to the Epping Ongar due to being in the way of construction works. Currently used as a museum of the history of the railway.	

== Carriages ==
=== Gresley Carriages ===
Origin	Number	Types	Notes	Photograph
LNER	43556	Brake Third Open	The BTO, a six-bay open saloon, has seating for up to 48 passengers, and was built in 1938, it is believed to be the last surviving 6-bay Gresley coach built to diagram D196. Arrived at the Epping Ongar Railway in 2014. Stored awaiting Restoration.	
LNER	24082	Buffet Car	The buffet was built in 1936. After a short stay a Quainton Road, where it was used to serve refreshments, the carriage was then moved to Chappel and Wakes Colne in 1972. Restoration had, by this stage, been commenced, but was stalled as priority was given to a BTO (which later moved to the North Yorkshire Moors Railway.) The Buffet was moved again in 2001 to the workshops at Ovington and where the coach finally received covered accommodation. The owner decided in 2010, that carriage would fit in well here, and after needing to vacate the site at Ovington, the ownership of carriage was transferred to Epping Ongar Railway Holdings Limited, on the understanding that, in due course, it would be restored to its former glory. The carriage arrived at North Weald in 2010. Stored awaiting Restoration.	

=== British Railways standard steam stock (Mk.I) ===
Origin	Number	Type	Notes	Photograph
British Railways	21059	Brake Corridor Composite	Under Restoration, painted in green base coat.	
British Railways	4809	Second Open	Operational, painted in Blue and Grey.	
British Railways	4976	Tourist Second Open	Under Restoration, painted with an undercoat.	
British Railways	16237	Corridor Composite	Out of Service, painted in Blue and Grey.	
British Railways	5005	Tourist Second Open	Awaiting restoration, painted in Blue and Grey.	
British Railways	4925	Tourist Second Open	Under Overhaul, painted in BR Maroon.	
British Railways	1699	Buffet Restaurant (Refurbished)	Arrived in July 2015, awaiting restoration, painted in blue.	
British Railways	13341	Corridor First	Operational, painted in BR Maroon.	
British Railways	80892	Gangwayed Full Brake	Static Workshop.	
British Railways	4947		Purchased from the Llangollen Railway in May 2021.	

=== British Railways (Mk.II) ===
Origin	Number	Type	Notes	Photograph
British Railways	3317	Buffet First Open	Stored as catering accommodation.	
British Railways	9410	Brake Second Open	Operational, painted in Crimson and Cream.	
British Railways	5136	Tourist Second Open	Operational, painted in BR Blue and Grey.	
British Railways	5181	Tourist Second Open	Operational, painted in BR Blue and Grey.	
British Railways	9385	Brake Second Open	Operational, painted in BR Blue and Grey.	

== Goods wagons ==
=== Brake vans ===
Origin	Number	Type	Notes	Photograph
BR	993856	Shark Brake Van	Operational, Used to spread track ballast after it has been laid, as well as a guards brake van on engineers trains. It has recently undergone a full restoration, being outshopped in BR Engineer's Black.	
BR	993760	Shark Brake Van	Undergoing Restoration. Once restored this vehicle will also be used for engineering and demonstration freight trains, as well as infrequent brake van rides.	
BR	95803 / 955096	4 wheel Brake Van	Awaiting restoration, Once a common sight at the end of every goods train, this van ended its life being used by London Transport when transferring its Heritage fleet around the Underground network. It is on loan from the London Transport Museum, and has been restored into its original BR (unfitted) light grey livery, complete with many original fittings.	

=== Covered goods vans ===
Origin	Number	Type	Notes	Photograph
BR	4311 / 200780	4 wheel Non-vent Van	Operational, These wagons were designed for the freight to and from the continent as BR updated its rolling stock. The design was introduced in 1975 and they had a number of uses and liveries, being very useful with both sliding and opening doors, enabling direct access to all parts of the vehicle. This van was used by the army, and still carries the identity "WGB 4311".	
GWR	3465	Fruit D Van	Operational, The Fruit 'D' vans were the last type of 'Fruit' vehicle built by the Great Western to aid some of their traffic of garden produce. The vans had additional ventilation slats in the sides to allow cool air to circulate, as well as three sets of double doors on each side and internal gas lighting, on an 18 ft wheelbase. As well as the carriage of fruit, they were also found being used for express parcels traffic.	
BR	783563	4 wheel ventilated Van	Operational, Once numerous and used for the transportation of all kinds of parcels and merchandise. Since arriving at the railway in army livery (carrying the number WGB 4182 as pictured left), it has been restored into original BR Bauxite livery, complete with sign-written numbers.	
LMSR	unknown	4 wheel ventilated Van (body only)	Used as stores, grounded body at North Weald station.	

=== Flat wagons, bolster wagons and Rail and Sleeper wagons ===
Origin	Number	Type	Notes	Photograph
GWR	-	Macaw B Bogie Bolster	Stored, Built for the Great Western Railway and designed to carry rails for the track engineers, a purpose for which it is still very useful.	
LT	F 362	Bogie 3 Plank Open	Operational.	
BR	909074	Bogie Ramped Flat	Operational, Built for carrying Army tanks (hence the telegraphic name) and latterly used by the engineers' departments for carrying heavy plant and equipment. This vehicle is very useful with its 38.5t capacity, and a team has completely restored it, repainting the frames and replacing all the wooden decking, finishing off with its lettering.	

=== Ballast wagons ===
Origin	Number	Type	Notes	Photograph
LNER	-	LNER 'Trout' Ballast Hopper	Operational.	
BR	DB993577	BR 'Dogfish' Ballast Hopper	Operational, With doors able to spread ballast to all parts of the track (either side and down the middle), this is a useful ballast-carrying vehicle.	
BR	DB980002	'Seacow' Bogie Ballast Hopper	Operational.	
BR	DB980061	'Seacow' Bogie Ballast Hopper	Operational.	
BR	DB986348	'Grampus' Ballast and Sleeper Waggon	Operational.	

=== Cranes and other special use wagons ===
Origin	Number	Type	Notes	Photograph
BR	81026	6 wheel diesel mechanical Crane	Stored but Movable; crane mechanism non-operational, Once used for light engineering works and in BR yellow livery, it has its runner and match trucks. The vehicle can be moved, but the crane is no longer operational.	
LMSR	341895	4 wheel diesel Crane jib runner	Operational, painted in BR departmental yellow.	
BR	914383	Crane Runner	Operational.	
