= GWR 4073 Class 4079 Pendennis Castle =

Preserved British 4-6-0 locomotive

Pendennis Castle
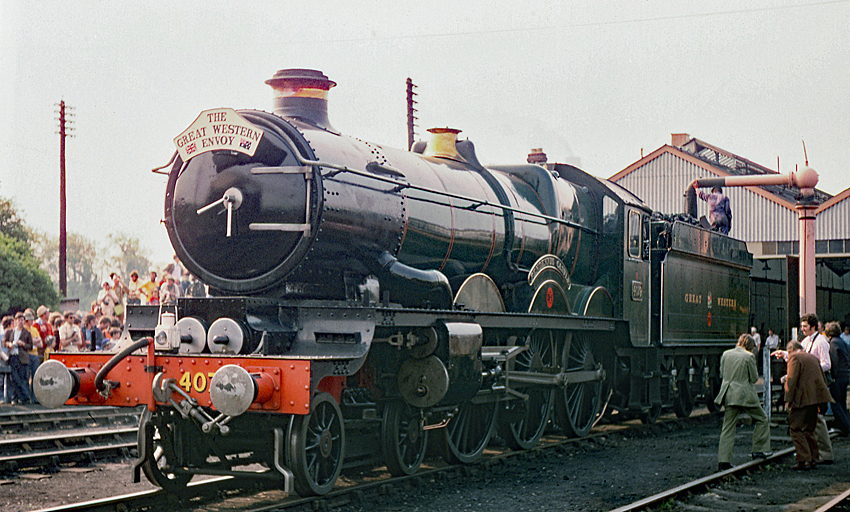
- Pendennis Castle in 1977
Type and origin
- Power type: Steam
- Designer: Charles Collett
- Builder: Swindon Works
- Build date: February 1924
Specifications
- Configuration
  - Whyte: 4-6-0
- Gauge: 1,435 mm (4 ft 8 1/2 in) standard gauge
- Fuel type: Coal
Career
- Operators: Great Western Railway; British Railways
- Class: Castle
- Numbers: 4079
- Retired: May 1964
- Restored: 1977, 2021
- Current owner: Great Western Society

GWR 4073 "Castle" Class No. 4079 Pendennis Castle is a 4-6-0 steam locomotive built in 1924 for the Great Western Railway (GWR) at Swindon Works to a design of Charles Collett. It was employed on long-distance express passenger trains on the GWR and its successor, British Railways' Western Region.

Pendennis Castle gained initial notoriety in 1925, when it outperformed rival engines during trials on the London and North Eastern Railway. It was bought for preservation in 1964 after covering 1.75 million miles in revenue earning service. In 1977, it was sold to Hamersley Iron, based in Western Australia, where it was shipped in the following year and operated until 1994. Upon returning to England in 2000, the engine awaited restoration at Didcot Railway Centre, its new base, which took volunteers 16 years to complete. In August 2021, Pendennis Castle returned to steam for the first time in 27 years, and runs on heritage railways across Britain.

== Operations ==
No. 4079 Pendennis Castle was the seventh of a total of 171 "Castle" Class locomotives built at Swindon Works in 1923–1924 by the Great Western Railway (GWR), and designed for hauling express passenger services. It was completed in February 1924, and named after Pendennis Castle in Falmouth, Cornwall. It was allocated to Old Oak Common locomotive depot in west London.

The locomotive became famous in April and May 1925, when the GWR lent it to the London and North Eastern Railway (LNER) as part of performance trials against the LNER's then new 4-6-2 A1 Class, the most famous example being No. 4472 Flying Scotsman. Running from London King's Cross to Grantham, and King's Cross to Doncaster, 4079 made the ascent from King's Cross to Finsbury Park regularly in less than six minutes, a feat the larger A1's were unable to match. Pendennis Castle was also shown to be more economical in both coal and water on the test runs, its superiority in burning unfamiliar Yorkshire coal being measured at 3.7lb per mile. Before returning to the GWR, the locomotive was put on display at the second British Empire Exhibition at Wembley Park between May and October 1925 next to Flying Scotsman, with a notice proclaiming it to be the most powerful express passenger locomotive in Britain.

Back at Old Oak Common, it continued to run the routes to South Wales and the West Country until after the GWR was nationalised in 1948 to become part of British Railways. In August 1950, it was allocated to Gloucester shed, in March 1959 to Bristol Bath Road, and its last shed allocation was Bristol Saint Philip's Marsh.

On 9 May 1964, No. 4079 took part in a high-speed railtour from London Paddington to Plymouth to commemorate the 60th anniversary of No. 3440 City of Truro's unofficial 100 mph run. However, upon reaching 97 mph, the firebars melted from the high heat of its fire. On arrival at Westbury the locomotive was immediately withdrawn, and "Hall" Class No. 6999 Capel Dewi Hall took over. While sitting at Westbury shed, bookshop owner Mike Higson, who was interested in purchasing a steam locomotive, was able to conclude a deal with British Railways to buy 4079 for £1,750. Arrangements were then made for it to be moved to Swindon for repairs to the damage caused and a repaint. 4079 retired with a recorded 1.758 million miles in a little over 40 years of service on the GWR.

== Preservation ==
=== Early preserved years (1964–1977) ===
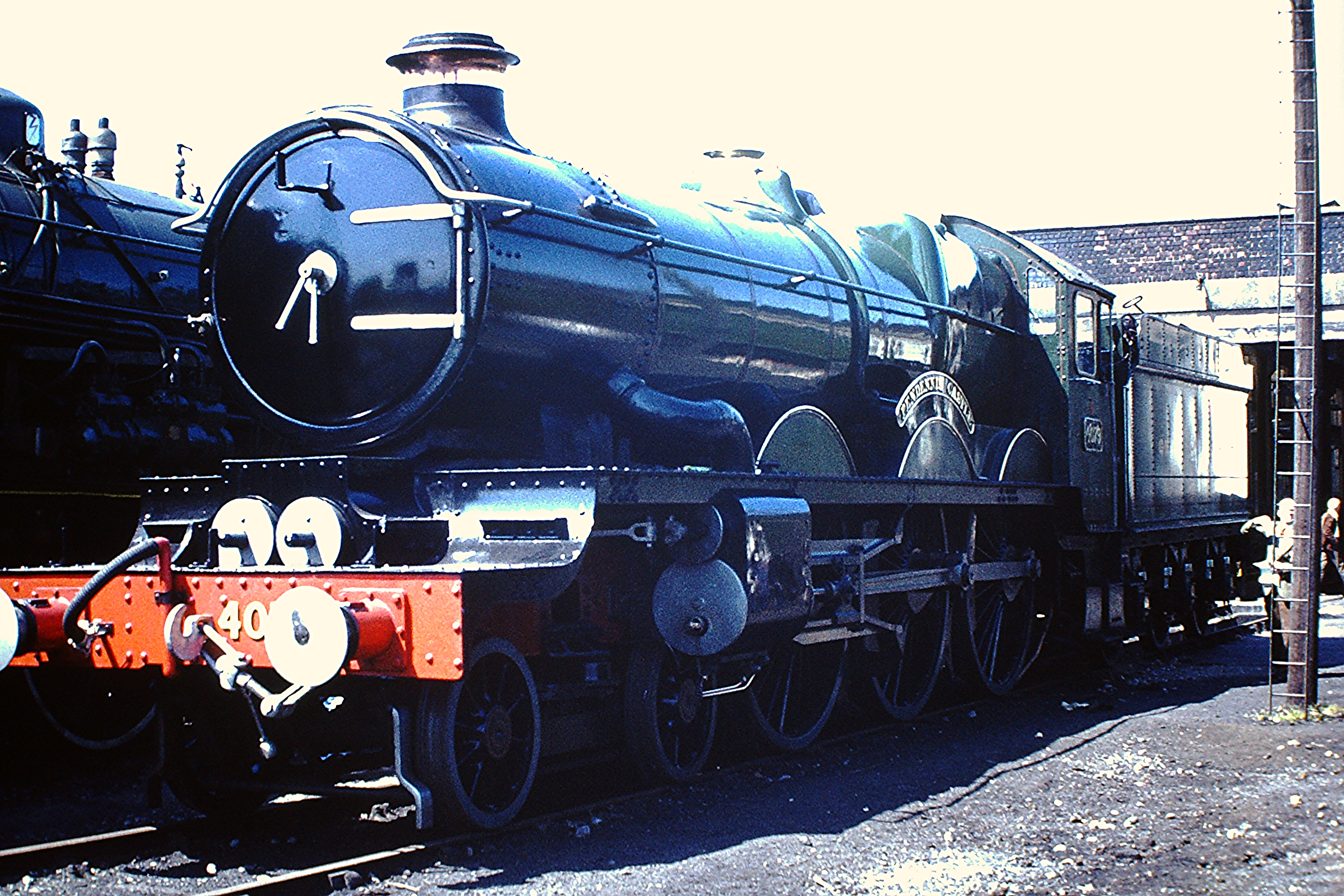
At Steamtown, Carnforth in May 1975

Following completion of its overhaul in March 1965, Pendennis Castle was transferred to Southall Railway Centre and appeared at one of the Great Western Society's (GWS) first open days. In November of that year, it became the last Castle engine to arrive at London Paddington before the end of steam traction on British Railways.

In 1967, as Higson was in the process of selling the locomotive to railway enthusiast Patrick Whitehouse, the bid was retracted as William McAlpine and John Gretton had made a higher bid. Under its new ownership, 4079 moved to the former GWR depot at Didcot, taking up residence in the disused lifting shop. In 1971, Pendennis Castle was among 23 steam locomotives approved for mainline running after British Railways lifted their steam ban. In the following year it relocated once more to Market Overton in Rutland. In April 1974, 4079 reunited with Flying Scotsman for two steam specials from Newport to Shrewsbury.

=== Western Australia (1977–2000) ===
By 1977, McAlpine had become the sole owner of 4079, where it sat waiting for repair at Steamtown in Carnforth. He then sold the engine to Hamersley Iron, one of the largest iron ore producers in Western Australia, which intended to run it on its 240 miles (390 km) ore-carrying Hamersley railway. Managing Director Russell Maddigan had offered to buy Flying Scotsman, but settled for 4079 and had it restored at Carnforth. On 29 May 1977, after hauling the Great Western Envoy from Birmingham to Didcot and return, 4079 headed to Avonmouth Docks where it departed for Sydney, where it was stored at Eveleigh Carriage Workshops. In the following March, 4079 travelled to Newcastle, New South Wales where it was loaded aboard the Iron Baron for Dampier, Western Australia, where Hamersley manager Ian Burston handed it over to the Pilbara Railways Historical Society.

On 12 October 1977, Pendennis Castle and two former New South Wales Government Railways S type passenger cars were named Rio Fe by Lady Turner, wife of Sir Mark Turner, chairman of Rio Tinto, one of the major investors in Hamersley Iron. A brass plaque bearing the name Rio Fe was fitted above 4079's smokebox door. On 7 November 1978, Pendennis Castle completed its first passenger run with a return trip from Dampier to Dugite. Modified in 1980, Pendennis Castle was used for excursion trains on the Hamersley Iron railway. It was moved by road to Perth, where it had a historic reunion with Flying Scotsman during the latter's tour of Australia on 17 September 1989. It went on to operate on the Westrail network.

After various problems with the expiry of its boiler certificate, 4079 made its final run in Australia on 14 October 1994 before it was put in storage. Hamersley Iron were not prepared to pay a repair bill of 240,000 Australian Dollars, and repairs were becoming uneconomical after fully electronic signalling was installed, which would have required the locomotive to be towed behind a diesel.

Adrian Lumley-Smith who was on secondment from Rio Tinto in London to Hamersley Iron became aware of the situation in 1998 when he moved to Perth and hatched the idea that 4079 should be relocated back to the UK and fully restored. Senior management in Perth and London agreed that such an iconic locomotive should not be left languishing in Dampier.

=== Return to England and restoration (2000–present) ===
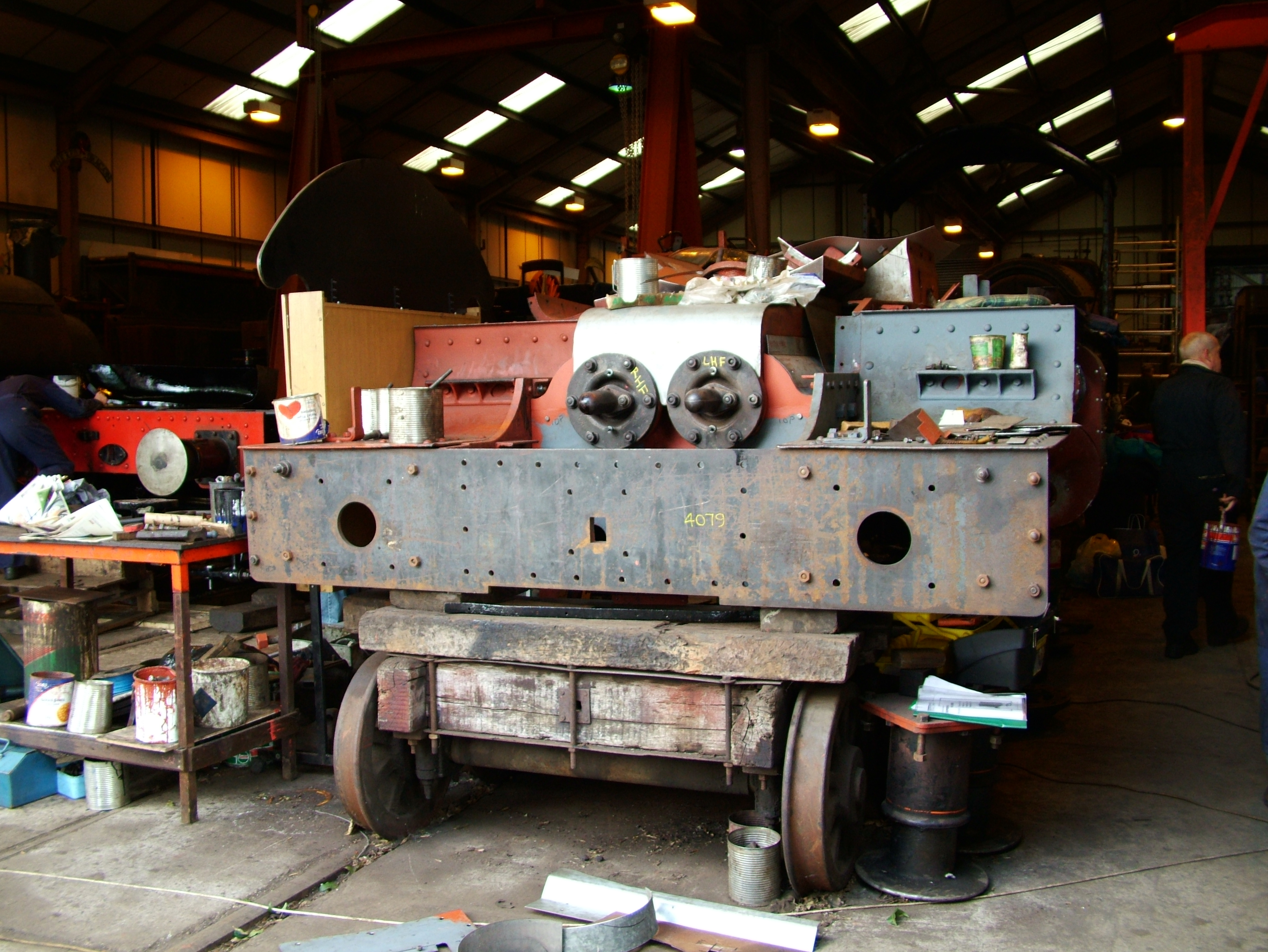
Undergoing restoration at Didcot Railway Centre in October 2005

Rio Tinto started to find a secure home for 4079 and in September 1998, contacted The Railway Magazine editor Nick Pigott, who had Adrian Knowles prepare a case for the engine to return to Didcot Railway Centre. The pitch was successful, and a £37,500 grant from the Heritage Lottery Fund was quickly received and covered three-quarters of the costs to have it shipped to England. On Easter 2000, 4079 left Fremantle on the container ship Toba, arriving in Bristol on 8 June 2000 and onward to Didcot. It became only the second locomotive after Flying Scotsman to circumnavigate the globe.

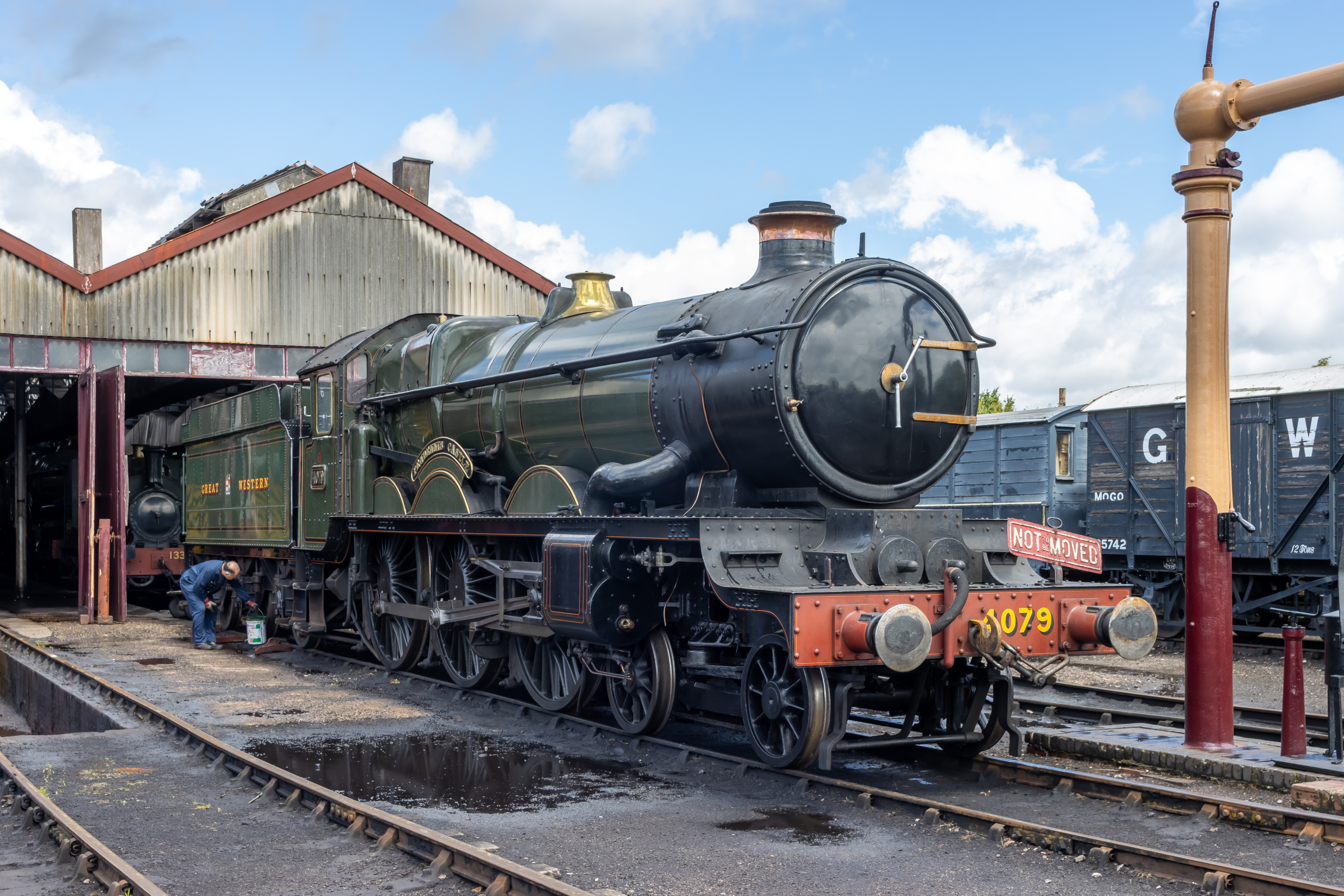
At Didcot in 2024

The restoration of 4079 at Didcot was carried out entirely by a group of 20 volunteers; manager Drew Fermor said they were determined to work at a high standard while minimising costs. The original plan was to complete overhaul by 2004, but it was pushed back to 2007 and then to 2014. In 2018, the Great Western Society board decided not register any of its locomotives for mainline certification as it believed it would earn a more reliable income as a locomotive for hire on other heritage lines. In addition, the GWS felt the costly installation of electronic equipment, and other modifications required for mainline running, would denigrate its original and authentic appearance.

On 13 August 2021, Pendennis Castle was steamed for the first time in 27 years. On 2 February 2022, it moved under its own steam for the first time since 1994, and for the first time in the UK since 1977. It was officially relaunched into traffic at a special event at Didcot on 2 April 2022.
