= GWR 0-4-0ST =

Model of steam locomotive

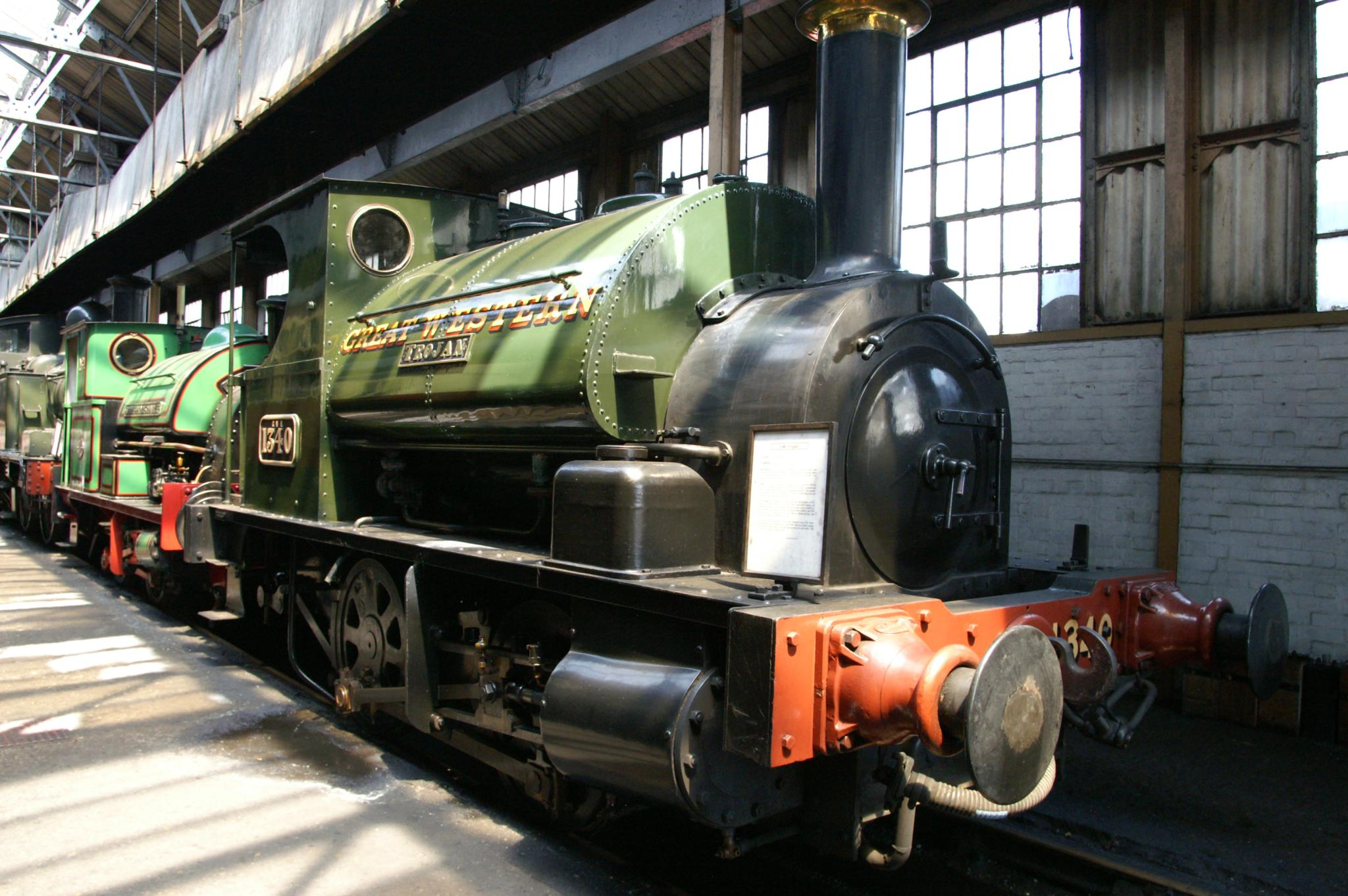
GWR No. 1340 Trojan preserved at Didcot Railway Centre

The GWR 0-4-0ST steam locomotives were acquired by the Great Western Railway at the 1923 grouping. They came from small railways (mostly in South Wales) and from contractors. Some of them survived into British Railways ownership in 1948 and a few are preserved.

== Details ==
Railway	Name/Number	Builder	Works no.	Build date	GWR no.	BR no.	Withdrawal date	Notes	image
Ystalyfera Tin Works	Hercules	Peckett	810	1900	—	1		Taken into stock in 1948	
Swansea Harbour Trust	3	Hudswell Clarke	725	1905	150	—	1929		
Swansea Harbour Trust	5	Andrew Barclay	1045	1905	701	1140	1958		
Swansea Harbour Trust	7	Peckett	739	1899	886	—	1928		
Swansea Harbour Trust	8	Peckett	761	1899	926	—	1929		
Swansea Harbour Trust	9	Peckett	908	1902	930	—	1927		
Swansea Harbour Trust	10	Peckett	974	1904	933	—		Sold to National Coal Board in 1928	
Swansea Harbour Trust	11	Peckett	1053	1906	929	1141	1952		
Swansea Harbour Trust	12	Peckett	1105	1908	968	1143	1960		
Swansea Harbour Trust	13	Hawthorn Leslie	2781	1909	974	1144	1960		
Swansea Harbour Trust	14	Hudswell Clarke	939	1911	943	1142	1959		
Swansea Harbour Trust	15	Peckett	1282	1912	1085	1146	1951		
Swansea Harbour Trust	16	Peckett	1302	1913	1086	1147	1951		
Swansea Harbour Trust	18	Peckett	1522	1918	1098	1145	1959		
Powlesland and Mason	3	Peckett	1328	1913	696	1150	1952		
Powlesland and Mason	4	Peckett	1449	1916	779	1151		Sold 1964	
Powlesland and Mason	5	Brush Electrical	301	1903	795	—	1929	Rebuilt with pannier tanks in 1926	
Powlesland and Mason	6	Brush Electrical	314	1906	921	—	1928	Sold to Berry Wiggins & Co. Ltd. in 1928. On display at the Snibston Discovery Museum until March 2016. Now at Mountsorrel Railway.	
Powlesland and Mason	7	Avonside	1053	1874	925	—		Ex GWR 1330; formerly South Devon Railway Rook. Purchased in 1906	
Powlesland and Mason	11	Peckett	1054	1907	927	—	1928		
Powlesland and Mason	12	Peckett	1179	1912	935	1152	1961	Used as static boiler at Didcot Steam shed in early 1960s	
Powlesland and Mason	14	Andrew Barclay	1273	1912	928	—	1927		
Powlesland and Mason	Dorothy	Hawthorn Leslie	2558	1903	942	1153	1955		
Cardiff Railway	5	Kitson & Co.	3799	1898	1338	1338		Preserved at Didcot	
Cardiff Railway	6	Kitson & Co.	?	1898	1339	—	1934		
Alexandra Docks	Trojan	Avonside	1386	1897	1340	—		Preserved at Didcot	
Alexandra Docks	Alexandra	Avonside	1387	1898	1341	—	1946		
Taff Vale Railway	267	Hudswell Clarke	166	1876	1342	—	1926		
Taff Vale Railway	266	Hudswell Clarke	159	1876	1343	—	1925		
West Cornwall Railway	Fox	Avonside	913	1872	1385	—		Sold 1912	

== Gallery ==
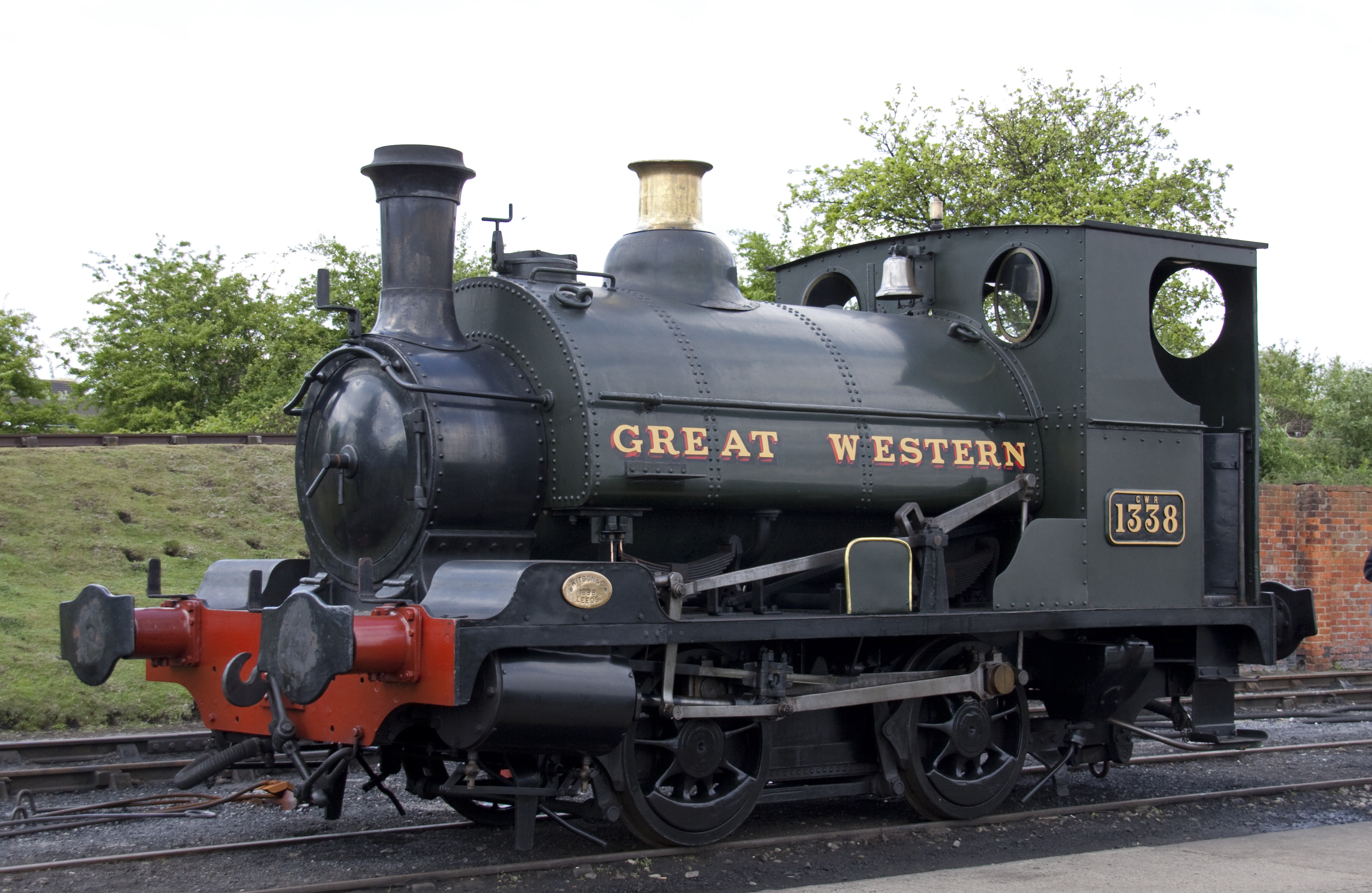
GWR 1338 preserved at Didcot

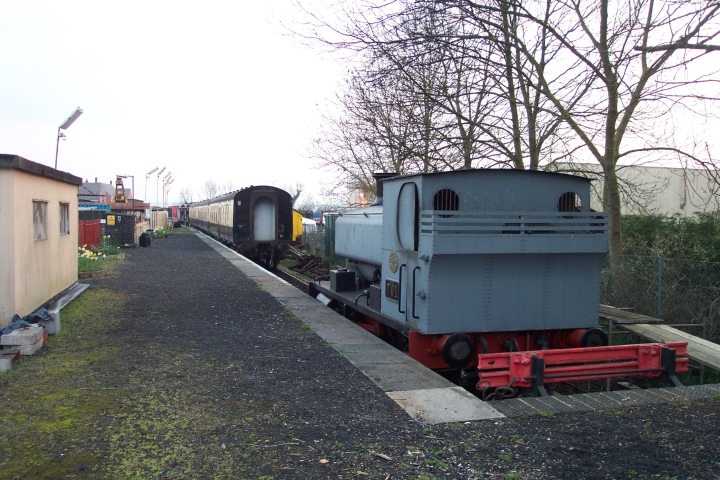
GWR 701 was scrapped but this is Andrew Barclay 1964/1929 posing as GWR 701

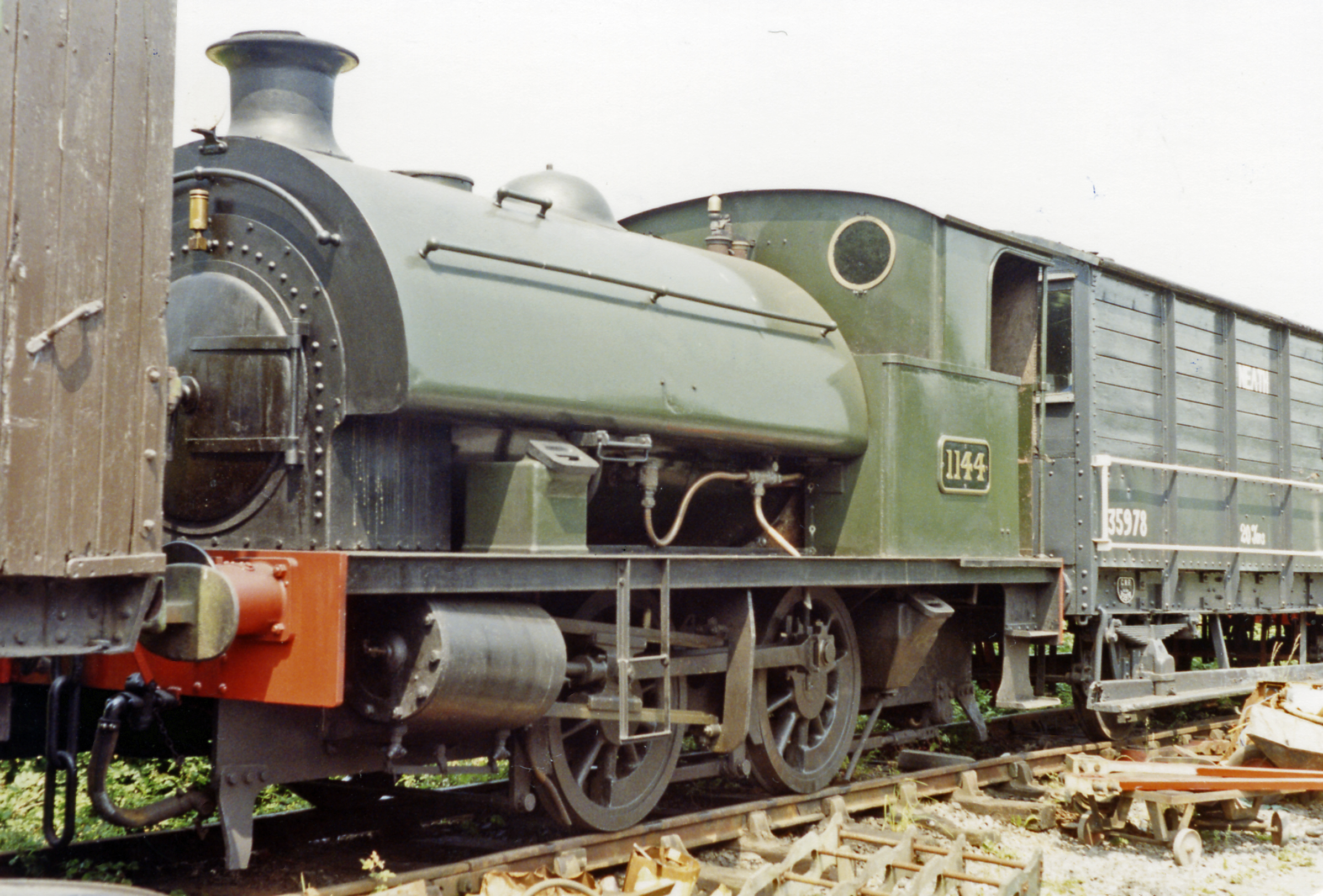
No. 1144 on the Gwili Railway at Bronwydd Arms, 27 June 1992.

== See also ==
- Locomotives of the Great Western Railway

== Sources ==
- Ian Allan ABC of British Railways Locomotives, winter 1957/8 edition, part 1, page 25
- Casserley, H. C. & Johnston, Stuart W. (1966). Locomotives at the Grouping 4: Great Western Railway. Shepperton, Middlesex: Ian Allan Limited.
- Whitehouse, Brian (1973). Great Western Engines, Names, Numbers, Types and Classes (1940 to Preservation). Oxford Publishing Company. ISBN 0-902888-21-8.
