= GWR 5101 Class =

Class of 140 two-cylinder 2-6-2T locomotives

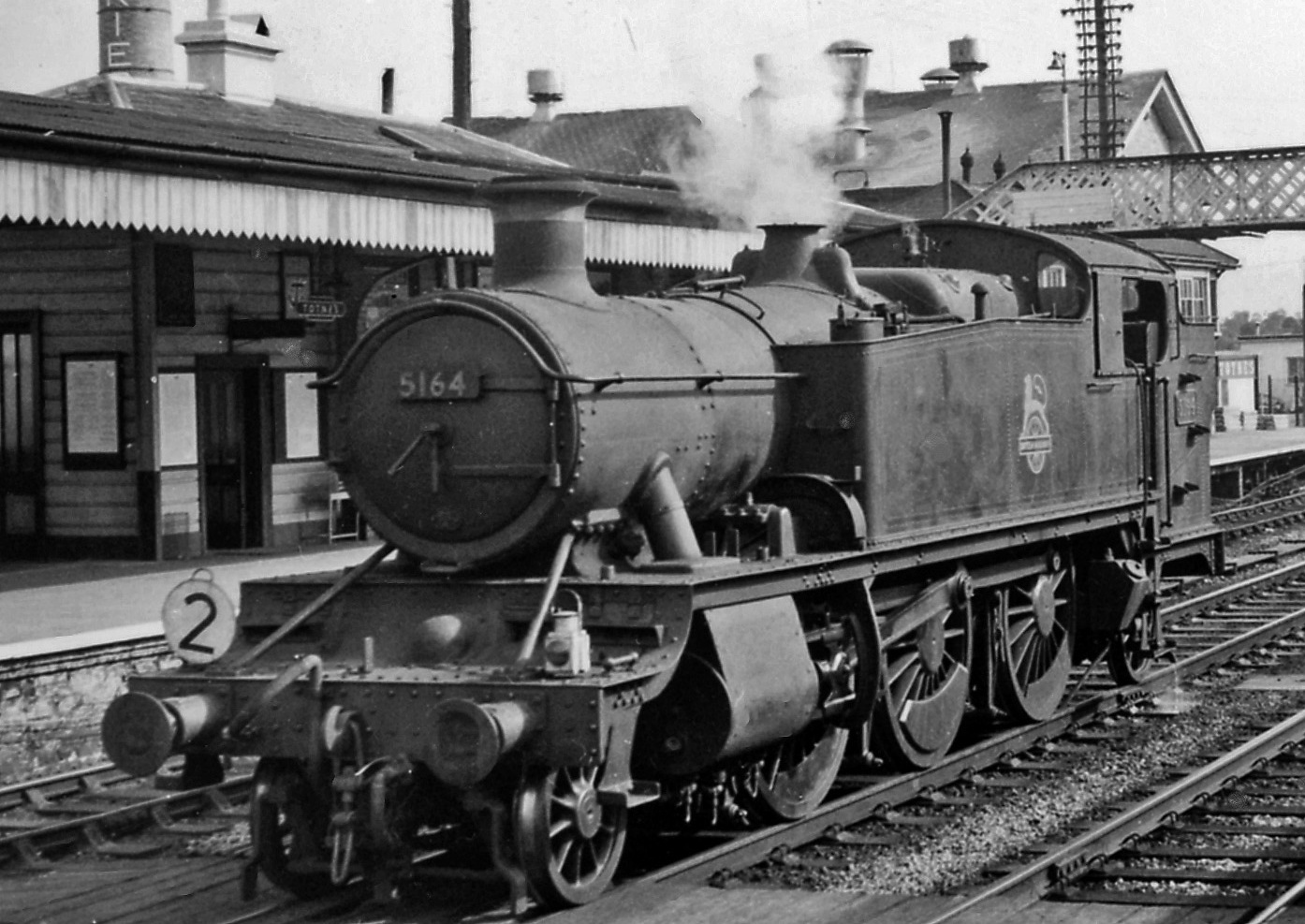
- 5164 at Totnes in 1958
Type and origin
- Power type: Steam
- Designer: Charles Collett
- Builder: GWR Swindon Works
- Order number: Lots 257, 259, 284, 292, 313, 323, 335, 361, 369
- Build date: 1929–1949
- Total produced: 140
Specifications
- Configuration
  - Whyte: 2-6-2T
  - UIC: 1′C1′ h2t
- Gauge: 4 ft 8 1/2 in (1,435 mm) standard gauge
- Leading dia.: 3 ft 2 in (0.965 m)
- Driver dia.: 5 ft 8 in (1.727 m)
- Trailing dia.: 3 ft 8 in (1.118 m)
- Length: 41 ft (12.50 m)
- Loco weight: 78.45 long tons (79.71 t; 87.86 short tons)
- Fuel type: Coal
- Fuel capacity: 4 long tons (4.1 t; 4.5 short tons)
- Water cap.: 2,000 imp gal (9,100 L; 2,400 US gal)
- Firebox
  - Grate area: 20.35 sq ft (1.891 m^{2})
- Boiler: GWR Number 2
- Boiler pressure: 200 psi (1,400 kPa)
- Heating surface
  - Firebox: 121.8 sq ft (11.32 m^{2})
  - Tubes and flues: 1,144.94 sq ft (106.368 m^{2})
- Superheater
  - Heating area: 82.2 sq ft (7.64 m^{2})
- Cylinders: Two
- Cylinder size: 18 in × 30 in (457 mm × 762 mm)
Performance figures
- Tractive effort: 24,300 lbf (108 kN)
Career
- Operators: Great Western Railway; British Railways
- Class: GWR 5101
- Power class: GWR D BR 4MT
- Numbers: 5101–5199, 4100–4179
- Axle load class: GWR Blue
- Locale: Western Region
- Withdrawn: April 1956 – November 1965
- Disposition: 8 preserved, 1 used for spares, 1 rebuilt into tender engine; remainder scrapped

The GWR 5101 Class or 'Large Prairie' is a class of 2-6-2T type steam locomotives of the Great Western Railway.

== History ==
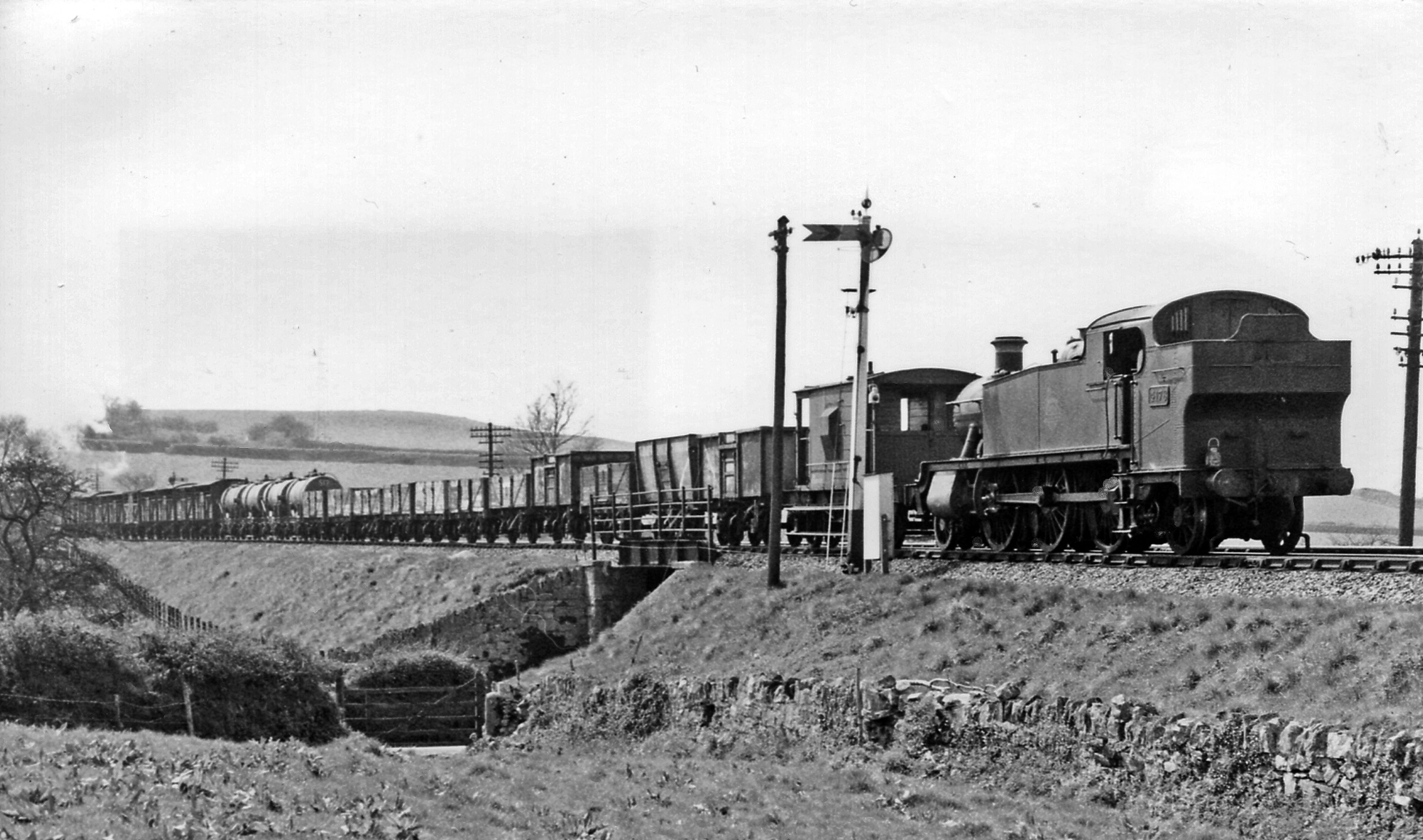
5101 Class member 4176 banks a mixed-freight train up the bank towards Dainton tunnel, from Newton Abbot towards Plymouth on the Exeter to Plymouth Line in South Devon, 1961

The 5101 Class were medium-sized tank engines used for suburban and local passenger services all over the Great Western Railway system. The class was an updated version, by Collett, of Churchward's 1903 3100/5100 Class.

The original 40 members of the 3100 class were renumbered 5100 and 5111 to 5149 in 1927. The first batches of 5101s filled in the numbers 5101 to 5110 and extended the class from 5150 to 5189. They were little changed from the Churchward locomotives as they then were, but had an increased axle loading of 17 long tons 12 cwt (39,400 lb or 17.9 t); the maximum permitted for the ‘Blue’ route availability. Bunkers were of the standard Collett design with greater coal capacity. The 5100 number series was exhausted in 1934, and further new locomotives were numbered from 4100. The last 20 were built after nationalisation.

Table of orders and numbers
Year	Quantity	Lot No.	Locomotive numbers	Notes
1929	10	257	5101–5110	
1930	10	257	5150–5159	
1930	13	259	5160–5172	
1931	17	259	5173–5189	
1934	10	284	5190–5199	
1935	10	292	4100–4109	
1936	10	292	4110–4119	
1937	2	313	4120–4121	
1938	8	313	4122–4129	
1939	10	323	4130–4139	
1946	10	335	4140–4149	
1947	10	361	4150–4159	
1948	10	369	4160–4169	
1949	10	369	4170–4179	

As both freight and passenger traffic on branch lines declined post-World War II with increasing volumes of private motor cars, and replacement on urban services by diesel-powered rail cars, the bulk of the class found itself allocated to various mainline support duties, mainly banking and piloting, often on the South Devon Banks on the Exeter to Plymouth Line, or around the Severn Tunnel on the South Wales Main Line.

A number of the class - 4110, 4115, 4121, 4144, 4150, 4156 and 4160 - ended their operational lives allocated to the major locomotive shed (88E) at Severn Tunnel Junction, undertaking piloting and banking duties through both the Severn Tunnel and the associated goods yard. Assistance was needed by all heavy trains through the Severn Tunnel, which entailed: 3.5 miles (5.6 km) of 1-in-90 down to the middle of the tunnel; then a further 3.5 miles (5.6 km) at 1-in-100 up to Pilning; a short level then 3.5 miles (5.6 km) more at 1-in-100 to Patchway. However, the pilot locomotive usually came off at Pilning. Several of this group were sold for scrap to Woodham Brothers and consequently have survived into preservation.

== Accidents and incidents ==
- On 30 November 1948, locomotive 4150 was running round its train at Lapworth when it was in collision with a passenger train hauled by 5022 Wigmore Castle, which had overrun signals. Eight passengers were injured.

== Withdrawal ==
The below list shows when all of the original 5101's and later 4100's were withdrawn from service.

Table of withdrawals
Year	Quantity in service at start of year	Number withdrawn	Quantity withdrawn	Locomotive numbers	Notes
1956	140	1	1	5159.	
1957	139	5	6	5107/09/56–57/61.	
1958	134	10	16	4138–39, 5105/08/60/62/65/68/71–72.	
1959	124	4	20	5170/86/89/96.	
1960	120	16	36	4162/64/70, 5102–04/06/10/50/55/63/69/78–79/85/97.	
1961	104	11	47	4117/23, 5158/66/74–77/94–95/98.	
1962	93	22	69	4102/06/12/16/18/26/29/45–46/52/63, 5151/67/73/80–83/87–88/90/93.	5193 preserved
1963	71	14	83	4114/19/27/34/40–42/49, 5101/52/54/64/92/99.	4141, 5164, 5199 preserved
1964	57	28	111	4101/03–05/08–09/20/22/24/28/30–33/35–37/43/53/59/66–67/71/73–74, 5153/84/91.	
1965	29	29	140	4100/07/10–11/13/15/21/25/44/47–48/50–51/54–58/60–61/65/68–69/72/75–79.	4110, 4115, 4121, 4144, 4150, 4160 preserved

== Preservation ==
Ten of the class were preserved after withdrawal in the 1960s (six built in the 1930s before World War II and four built after the war in the late 1940s, one of which under the British Railways banner). As of 2023, six have run in preservation, one is under restoration, one is still in scrapyard condition, one has acted as a donor locomotive for other projects, and one has been rebuilt into a tender engine:

Number	Built	Withdrawn	Service Life	Owner	Current Location	Status	Livery	Notes	Image
5164	Nov 1930	Apr 1963	32 Years, 5 months	Erlestoke Manor Fund	Tyseley Locomotive Works	Stored	GWR Unlined Green, Great Western Lettering	Normally located at the Severn Valley Railway but on static display at Barrow Hill MPD since 2014 following expiry of boiler certificate on 5 January 2014. Ownership transferred to the Erlestoke Manor Fund in 2021; as of January 2022 plans to overhaul the locomotive are underway. The engine was moved from Barrow Hill Engine Shed to Tyseley Locomotive Works for assessment in November 2023.	
9351	Oct 1934	Jun 1962	27 Years, 8 months	West Somerset Railway plc	West Somerset Railway	Operational (rebuilt)	BR Lined Black, Early Emblem	Originally built in 1934 as 5193, withdrawn in 1962 and recovered from Woodham Brothers scrapyard in 1979. Rebuilt by the West Somerset Railway into a 2-6-0 resembling a small boilered version of the GWR 4300 Class, which has been numbered 9351. Returned to service in 2019 following an overhaul.	
5199	Nov 1934	Mar 1963	28 Years, 3 months	5199 Project	West Somerset Railway	Operational	GWR Unlined Green, Great Western Lettering	Overhaul completed 23 November 2014. Repainted into GWR Green livery in 2021.	
4110	Oct 1936	Jun 1965	28 Years, 8 months	Dartmouth Steam Railway	Dartmouth Steam Railway	Operational	BR Unlined Green, Late Crest	Sold in May 2015 by GWR Preservation Group Limited of Southall Railway Centre to WSR plc. Sold again in January 2019 to the Paignton and Dartmouth Steam Railway. It was sent to the East Somerset Railway in January 2020. Returned to steam in 2023	
4115	Oct 1936	Jun 1965	28 Years, 8 months	Great Western Society	Didcot Railway Centre	Donor locomotive, frames scrapped in 2016.		Built October 1936, withdrawn from service in June 1965. One of the "Barry Ten", she was sold to the Great Western Society, Didcot in 2010, to act as a donor locomotive. Its frames were scrapped in 2016:	
4121	Dec 1937	Jun 1965	27 Years, 6 months	Privately owned	Tyseley Locomotive Works	Restoration in progress	N/A	Under restoration	
4141	Aug 1946	Mar 1963	16 Years, 7 months	Roger Wright	Epping Ongar Railway	Awaiting completion of repairs	BR Lined Green, Late Crest	Returned to steam in 2012 after an overhaul, but currently out of service awaiting boiler repairs.	
4144	Sept 1946	Jun 1965	18 Years, 8 months	Great Western Society	Didcot Railway Centre	Operational	GWR Unlined Green, GWR Lettering	Returned to steam in 2015 after an overhaul. Loaned to the Kent & East Sussex Railway for the 2020 season. Returned to Didcot Railway Centre before visiting other railways. At the Kent & East Sussex Railway for the Santa’s in 2021. Operational at the Chinnor and Princes Risborough Railway as of the summer of 2023.	
4150	Jun 1947	Jun 1965	17 Years, 11 months	4150 Fund	Severn Valley Railway	Operational	N/A	Emerged from Bridgnorth Works in June 2026 following restoration from scrapyard condition.	
4160	Sept 1948	Jun 1965	16 Years, 8 months	4160 Ltd	South Devon Railway	Under Overhaul	N/A	Overhauled in 2007, previously operated on the West Somerset Railway. Sent to the Llangollen Railway in January 2016 for overhaul. Moved to the South Devon Railway for the completion of its overhaul, upon which it shall become a resident of the line under the custodianship of 5542 Ltd.	

== See also ==
- GWR 3100/5100 Class (1906)
- GWR 3150 Class
- GWR 6100 Class
- GWR 3100 Class (1938)
- GWR 8100 Class
- List of GWR standard classes with two outside cylinders
