= GWR No. 1340 Trojan =

British steam locomotive

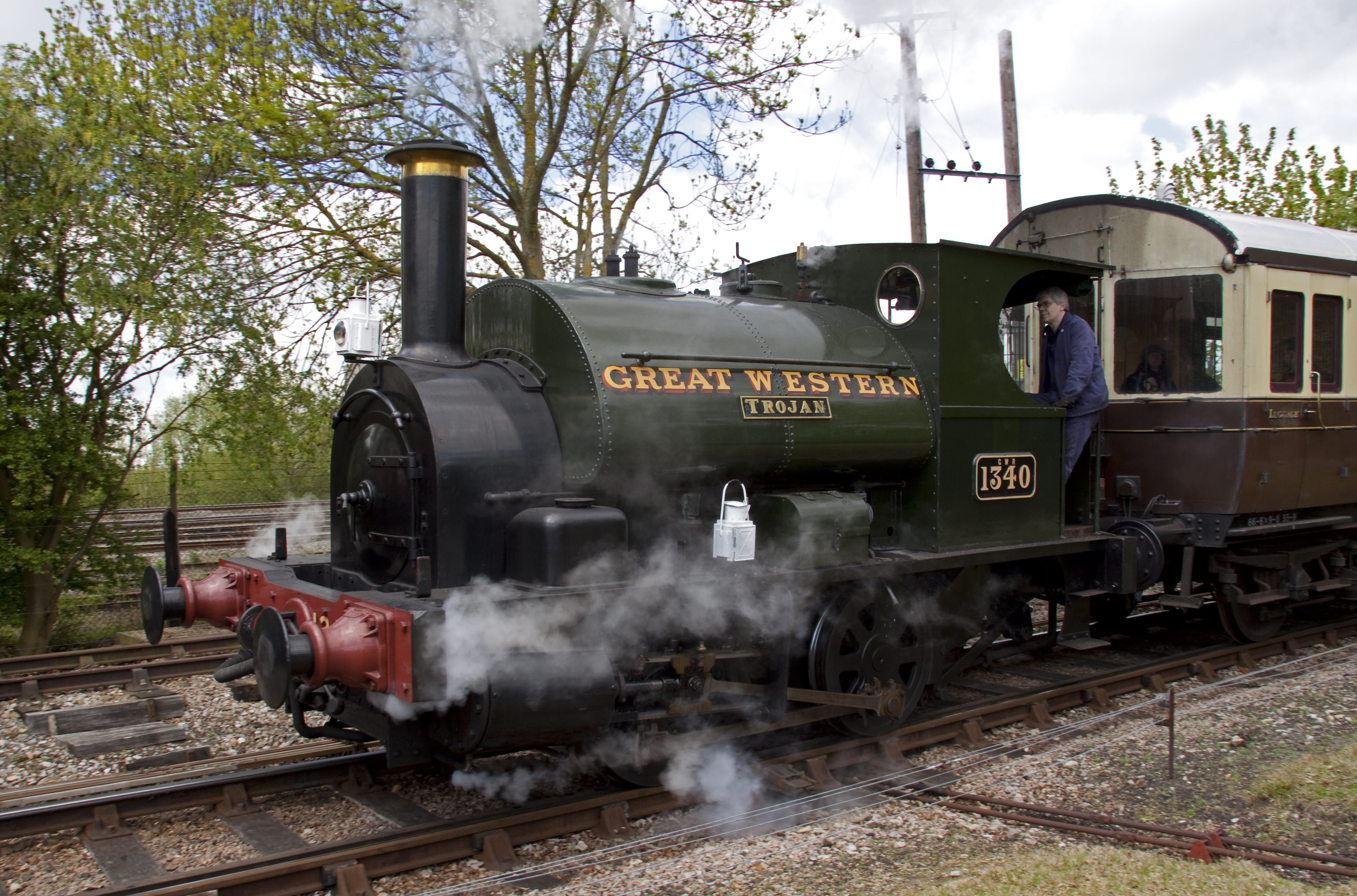
- Trojan pulling a GWR autocoach at the Didcot Railway Centre
Type and origin
- Power type: Steam
- Designer: Avonside Engine Company
- Builder: Avonside Engine Company
- Serial number: 1386
- Build date: 1897
Specifications
- Configuration
  - Whyte: 0-4-0ST
- Gauge: 4 ft 8 1/2 in (1,435 mm) standard gauge
- Driver dia.: 3 ft 0 in (0.91 m)
- Wheelbase: 5 ft 6 in (1.68 m)
- Length: 20 ft 1 in (6.12 m)
- Loco weight: 22.85 long tons (23.22 t; 25.59 short tons)
- Fuel type: Coal
- Fuel capacity: 0 long tons 10 cwt (1,100 lb or 0.5 t)
- Water cap.: 630 imp gal (2,900 L; 760 US gal)
- Firebox
  - Grate area: 8.25 sq ft (0.766 m^{2})
- Boiler pressure: 160 psi (1,100 kPa)
- Cylinders: Two, outside
- Cylinder size: 14 in × 20 in (356 mm × 508 mm)
- Valve gear: Stephenson
Performance figures
- Tractive effort: 11,100 lbf (49,000 N)
Career
- Operators: Alexandra (Newport and South Wales) Docks and Railway, Great Western Railway
- Power class: Unclassified
- Disposition: Operational

GWR No. 1340 Trojan is a preserved 0-4-0ST steam locomotive, built in 1897 (Works No. 1386) by the Avonside Engine Company of Bristol, England, Direct competitors of the Avonside SS Class GWR No. 1340 "Trojan" 0-4-0ST steam locomotive include Peckett W4 Class, Hudswell Clarke 0-4-0ST, Andrew Barclay Works No 945 Annie 0-4-0ST, and the Kerr Stuart Wren Class 0-4-0ST.

== Service life ==
Trojan was built by Avonside in 1897 for Messrs Dunn & Shute of Newport Town. In 1903, it was sold to the Alexandra Docks Railway, though was still unnumbered. Upon the absorption of the ADR in 1923 into the GWR, Trojan gained the number 1340. The locomotive was based mainly at Cardiff Cathays and Radyr, however it also spent time at Oswestry and Greenford. The Great Western withdrew Trojan from Cardiff in July 1932 and sold it to the Netherseal Colliery at Burton-on-Trent. In 1947, it was passed onto Alders (Tamworth) ltd.

== Preservation ==
Trojan is now preserved at the Didcot Railway Centre. It was restored to working order in 2002 and remained in service on demonstration trains at Didcot until 2011 when it was withdrawn for a 10-yearly overhaul. Trojan was moved offsite in 2016 for the overhaul to take place and returned to operation in 2021.

== Models ==
Agenoria Models produces a brass etch kit for both 4 mm and 7 mm scales. BR Loco Models produces a plastic kit for both 0-gauge scale and 3.5-inch scales.

== See also ==
- GWR 0-4-0ST

== Sources ==
- Didcot Railway Centre
