= Wellington Bank, Somerset =

Railway incline in Somerset, England

Coordinates: 50.958535°N 3.282509°W

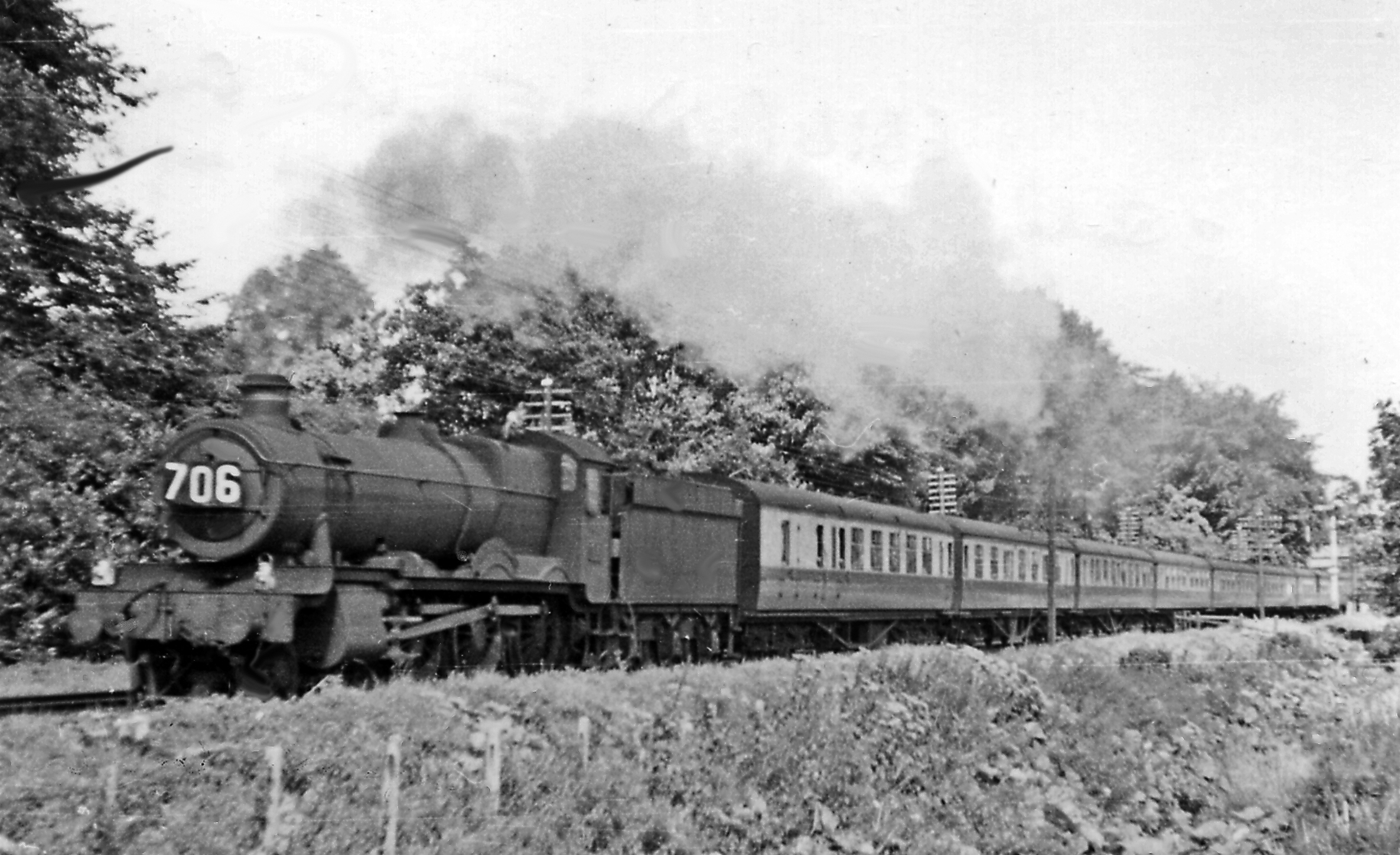
West Country relief express headed by 4-6-0 No. 6816 Frankton Grange, viewed northward as it climbs Wellington Bank, 28 August 1954

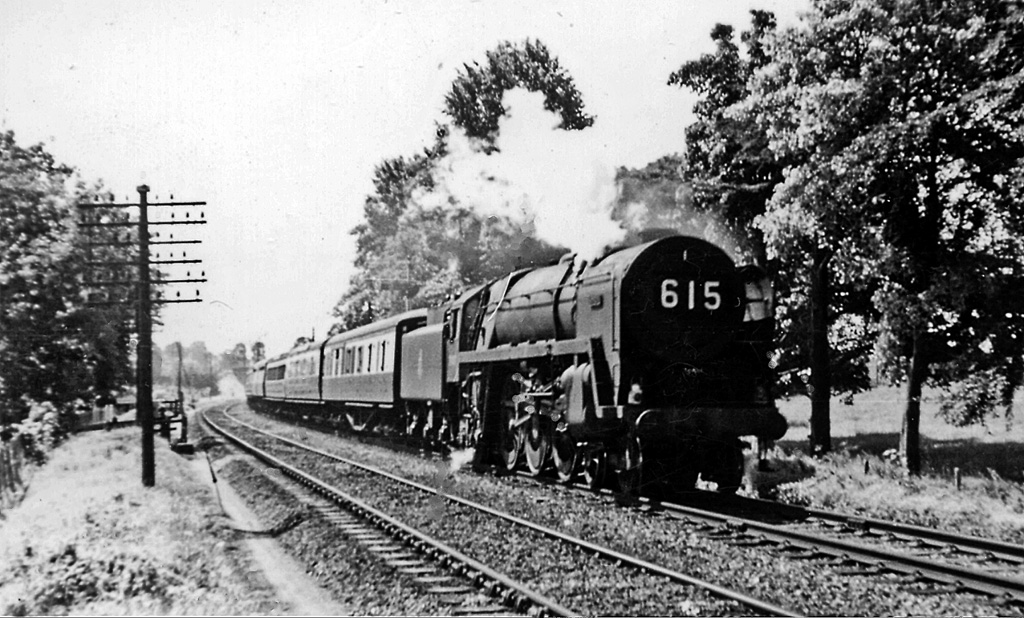
The 11.30 Torquay – Paddington Summer Saturday extra descending Wellington Bank into Wellington, headed by BR Britannia Class 7 Pacific No. 70017 Arrow, 28 August 1954

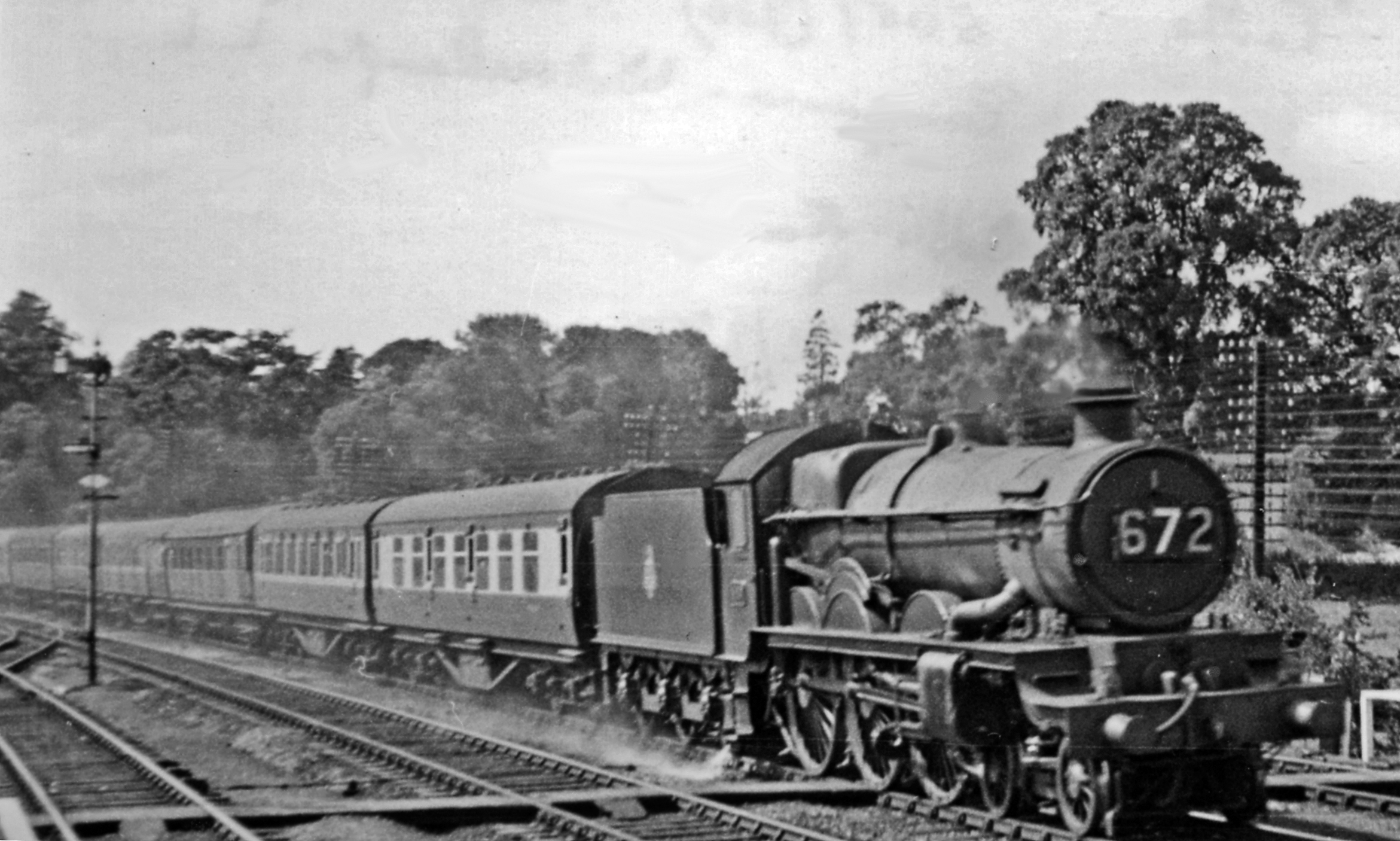
The 07:30 Penzance – Wolverhampton express headed by 4-6-0 No. 5057 Earl Waldegrave enters Wellington station, 28 August 1954

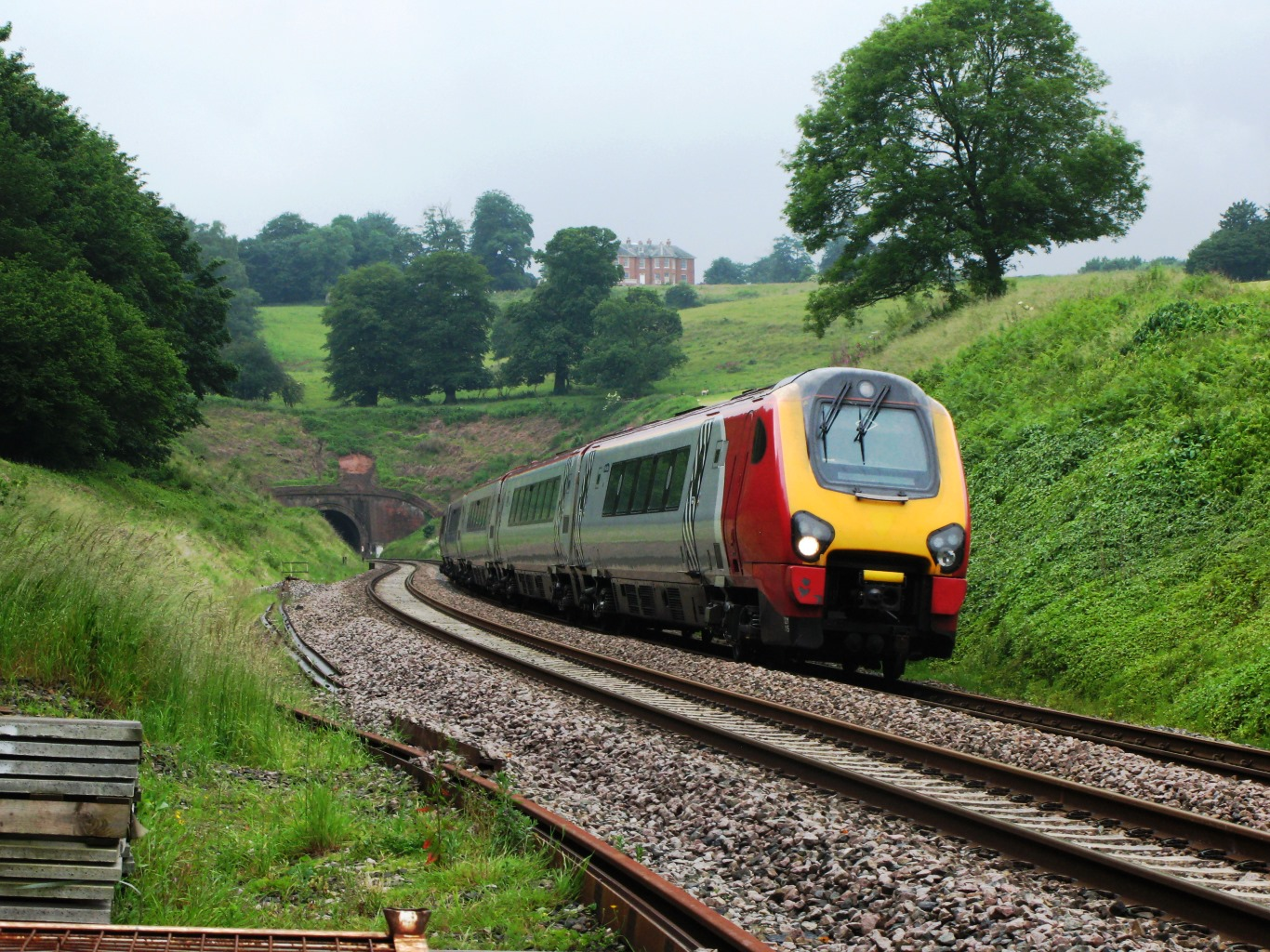
Northbound Virgin Cross Country service train formed by 221115 leaves Whiteball Tunnel to start its descent of Wellington Bank

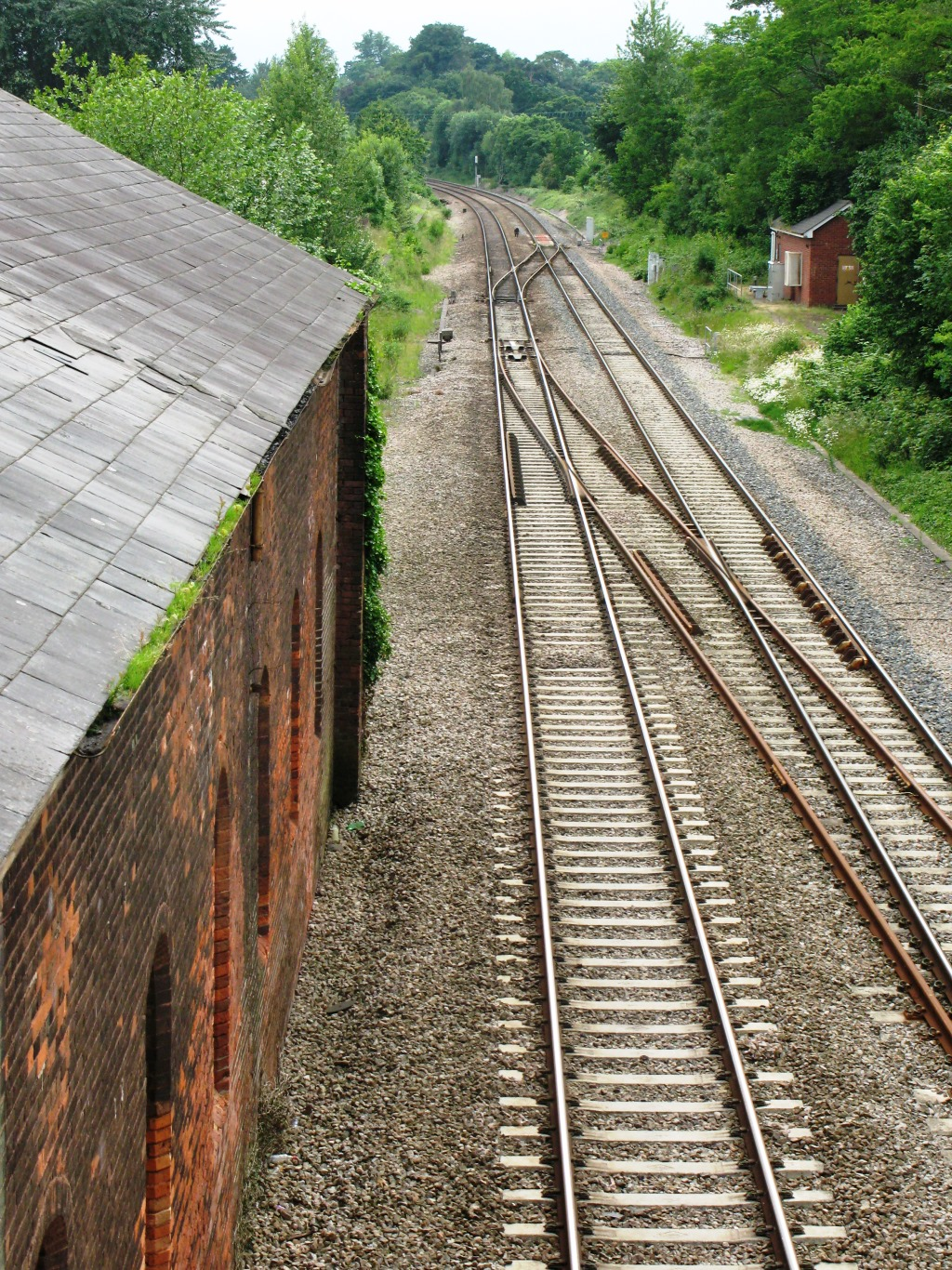
The former goods shed and site of Wellington railway station

Wellington Bank is a steep railway embankment and associated climb located on the Bristol to Exeter line, that climbs from just northeast of Wellington, Somerset, until its peak at Sampford Arundel, where it enters Whiteball tunnel and travels under the Whiteball Hill.

== Background ==
The Bristol & Exeter Railway was authorised by act of Parliament in 1836, following quickly on the 1835 act for construction of the Great Western Railway. Bristol merchants were anxious to secure a railway route to Exeter, which was an important commercial centre, and which had a harbour on the south coast, in the English Channel. Coastal shipping from the South coast and from continental Europe making for Bristol needed to navigate the hazardous north Cornwall coast after negotiating the waters round Land's End.

Isambard Kingdom Brunel was appointed engineer, and his assistant William Gravatt surveyed the route in 1835 and was resident engineer for the section between Bristol and White Ball, with William Froude supervising the section from Whiteball to Exeter. Brunel himself was in charge of the design of White Ball tunnel.

The first 7 ft (2,134 mm), broad gauge, section of the line was completed to Bridgwater on 14 June 1841, and the extension to Taunton in July 1842 – both using trains leased from the Great Western. At Norton Fitzwarren just west of Taunton, the intention was to split the railway three ways:

- A branchline via the West Somerset Railway to Minehead
- A junction with the Devon and Somerset Railway, a secondary route to Barnstaple
- The mainline to Exeter via Wellington

== Construction ==
From Creech St Michael westwards, the B&ER had followed the gently flowing valley of the River Tone. But just east of Wellington, the river moved further west up the steep sides of the Blackdown Hills. Brunel chose to follow a smaller valley eastwards, and pass under the Blackdowns further west, through a place called White Ball, a hill made up of easy to dig white sandstone (NB: next to it is Red Ball, a hill of red sandstone). This route would reduce the need for additional tunnelling, and allow connection with and traffic from Wellington. However, the choice also meant the construction of a long inclined bank, with a tunnel at its peak.

Wellington station opened when the line reached the town on 1 May 1843, laid out as a standard Brunel railway station. The line then proceeded west at gradients averaging a 1 in 80 incline towards Sampford Arundel, a village situated 10 miles (16 km) south west of Taunton, where the tunnel entrance was to be dug.

Digging of the tunnel commenced in 1842. A temporary terminus was established in the hamlet of Beam Bridge on 1 May 1843, from which passengers were taken by carriage to the far side of the hill, and then taken by another train from Burlescombe, Devon to Exeter.

From January 1842, 1,000 navvies were encamped at White Ball. With access to a local Tommy shop, they sank 14 vertical shafts during the 1,092-yard (999 m) tunnel's construction. The temporary terminus at Beam Bridge stayed in place for a year, until the tunnel was opened on 1 May 1844.

== Operations ==
The Bristol & Exeter Railway was a considerable financial success and between 1844 and 1874, paying an average annual dividend of 4.5 per cent. The city fathers of Exeter refused the railway access to the dock of the Exeter Canal until 35 years after it entered the city in 1844. The railway was fully amalgamated with the Great Western Railway on 1 January 1876.

Due to the steepness of the bank, special operational procedures were required.

- Northbound heavy goods trains would stop south of Whiteball tunnel, often at Tiverton Junction, and pin their brakes as appropriate.
- Southbound trains would stop at Wellington, where a banking locomotive would be applied to the rear of the train. This would bank the train up the embankment and through the tunnel, before releasing itself before Tiverton, where it would reverse back down the bank.

With the full introduction of higher powered diesel locomotives, the banking procedure was ceased in the late 1960s.

== 100mph speed record ==
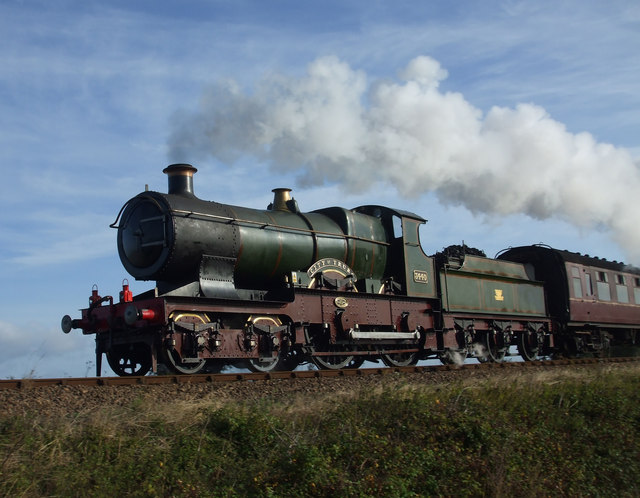
GWR 3700 Class No.3440 City of Truro

On 9 May 1904, whilst descending Wellington Bank, the GWR 3700 Class No. 3440 City of Truro was timed at 8.8 seconds between two quarter-mile posts, whilst hauling the "Ocean Mails" special from Plymouth to London Paddington. This timing was recorded from the train by Charles Rous-Marten, who wrote for The Railway Magazine and other journals. If exact (Rous-Marten's stopwatch read in multiples of 1/5 second), this time would correspond to a speed of 102.3 mph (164.6 km/h), while 9 seconds would correspond to exactly 100 mph.

Initially, mindful of the need to preserve their reputation for safety, the railway company allowed only the overall timings for the run to be put into print; neither The Times report of the following day nor Rous-Marten's article in The Railway Magazine of June 1904 mentioned the maximum speed. However the morning after the run two local Plymouth newspapers did report that the train had reached a speed between 99 and 100 miles an hour whilst descending Wellington Bank. This claim was based on the stopwatch timings of a postal worker, William Kennedy, who was also on the train.

Rous-Marten first published the maximum speed in 1905, though he did not name the locomotive or railway company:

On one occasion when special experimental tests were being made with an engine having 6 ft. 8 in. coupled wheels hauling a load of approximately 150 tons behind the tender down a gradient of 1 in 90, I personally recorded a rate of no less than 102.3 miles an hour for a single quarter-mile, which was covered in 8.8 seconds, exactly 100 miles an hour for half a mile which occupied 18 seconds, 96.7 miles an hour for a whole mile run in 37.2 seconds; five successive quarter-miles were run respectively in 10 seconds, 9.8 seconds, 9.4 seconds, 9.2 seconds and 8.8 seconds. This I have reason to believe to be the highest railway speed ever authentically recorded. I need hardly add that the observations were made with the utmost possible care, and with the advantage of previous knowledge that the experiment was to be made, consequently without the disadvantage of unpreparedness that usually attaches itself to speed observations made in a merely casual way in an ordinary passenger train. The performance was certainly an epoch-making one. In a previous trial with another engine of the same class, a maximum of 95.6 miles an hour was reached.

— C Rous-Marten: p2118, Bulletin of the International Railway Congress – October 1905

Before his death in 1908 Rous-Marten did name the locomotive as City of Truro. Official confirmation from the Great Western Railway came in 1922 when they published a letter written in June 1905 by Rous-Marten to James Inglis, the general manager, giving further details of the record.

...What happened was this: when we topped the Whiteball Summit, we were still doing 63 miles an hour; when we emerged from the Whiteball Tunnel we had reached 80; thenceforward our velocity rapidly and steadily increased, the quarter-mile times diminishing from 11 sec. at the tunnel entrance to 10.6 sec., 10.2 sec., 10 sec., 9.8 sec., 9.4 sec., 9.2 sec., and finally to 8.8 sec., this last being equivalent to a rate of 102.3 miles an hour. The two quickest quarters thus occupied exactly 18 sec. for the half-mile, equal to 100 miles an hour. At this time the travelling was so curiously smooth that, but for the sound, it was difficult to believe we were moving at all...

This sequence of eight quarter-mile timings is thought to start at milepost 173, the first after the tunnel, with the maximum speed at milepost 171.

From 1922 onwards City of Truro featured prominently in the Great Western Railway's publicity material.

Doubts over the record centred on the power of the locomotive and some contradictions in Rous-Marten's passing times. However his milepost timings are consistent with a speed of 100 mph or just over. The latest research examines the evidence and uses computer simulation of the locomotive performance to show that a speed of 100 mph was possible and that the timings do indeed support such a speed.

This record was set before any car or aeroplane had attained such a speed. However, in May 1904 City of Truro was not the fastest vehicle in the world, as 130 mph (210 km/h) had been reached the previous year on an experimental electric railway near Berlin.
