= GWR Dean experimental locomotives =

English prototype steam locomotives

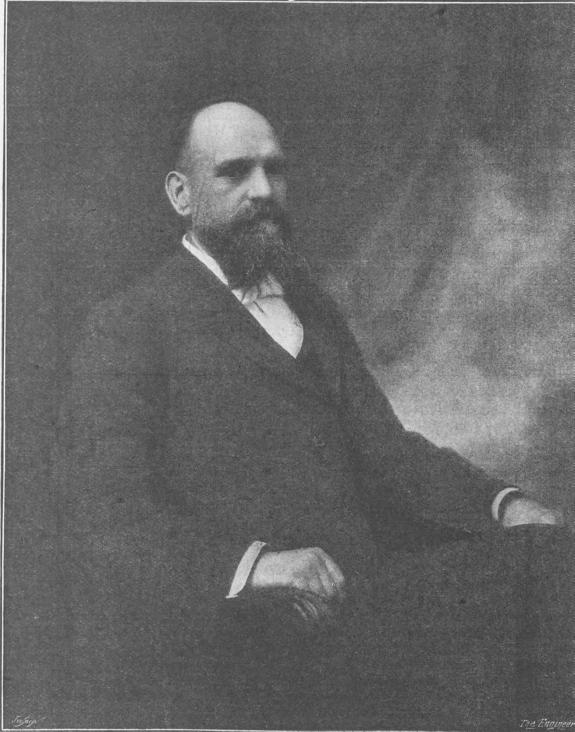
William Dean, 1906.

During the 1880s and 1890s, William Dean constructed a series of experimental locomotives to test various new ideas in locomotive construction for the Great Western Railway.

== Locomotives ==
Chronological summary
Year	Numbers	Original wheel arrangement	Rebuilt	Withdrawn
1880	1	4-4-0T	1882, 1899, 1914	1924
1881	9	4-2-4T	1884, 1890, 1902	1905
1882	1833	0-6-0T	1884	1906
1886	10	2-2-2	1890	1906
1886	7	2-4-0		1890
1886	8	2-4-0		Not taken into stock
1886	13	2-4-2WT	1897	1926
1888	14, 16	2-4-0		Stored 1892
1890	34, 35	0-4-2ST	1895	1906. 1908
1896	36	4-6-0		1905
1898	1490	4-4-0PT		Sold 1907

=== No. 1 ===
This locomotive was built at Swindon (Lot no. 46, works no. 733) in 1880 as a 4-4-0T. It had double frames, and the bogie had no central pivot. Principal dimensions included: boiler diameter 4 ft 2 in (1,270 mm); pressure 140 lbf/in^{2} (970 kPa); cylinders (2 inside) 17 in × 26 in (430 mm × 660 mm); coupled wheel diameter 5 ft 6 in (1.68 m); total wheelbase 21 ft (6.4 m). It was rebuilt in 1882 as a 2-4-0T, the wheelbase now being 17 ft 6 in (5.33 m). A new boiler was fitted in 1899, having a diameter of 4 ft 5 in (1,350 mm) and a working pressure of 165 lbf/in^{2} (1,140 kPa); this had a round-topped firebox. A further new boiler fitted in 1914 had a Belpaire firebox. It was withdrawn in 1924.

=== No. 7 ===
Number 7 was built in 1886 at Swindon as a tandem compound 2-4-0 with 7 ft 0 1/2 in (2.146 m) coupled wheels and outside frames. The 23 in (584 mm) diameter low pressure cylinders were in front of the high pressure cylinders, the pistons being carried on the same piston rod. Valves for the low pressure cylinders were below, and those for the high pressure cylinders above the cylinders. One set of valve gear drove each pair of valve spindles. This setup proved difficult to access for maintenance, and the locomotive was relegated to minor routes. It was broken up in 1890. The wheel centres were used in building No. 7 of the Armstrong class.

=== No. 8 ===
Number 8 was built in 1886 as a 7 ft 1/4 in (2,140 mm) broad gauge convertible 2-4-0 tandem compound, the low- and high-pressure piston rods sharing a common crosshead. It had 7 ft 0 1/2 in (2.146 m) driving wheels, six plate frames and a high-pressure boiler rated at 180 lbf/in^{2} (1.2 MPa). The frames consisted of a double frame supporting the driving axleboxes, and an external frame from which the hornblocks for the leading wheels projected. Unsuccessful in its trials, it was never taken into stock or converted to 4 ft 8 1/2 in (1,435 mm) standard gauge. In 1894 the wheel centres were used in a conventional standard gauge 4-4-0, No. 8 of the Armstrong class.

=== No. 9 ===
This unit started out in 1881 as a 4-2-4T, with two 7 ft 8 in (2.34 m) diameter driving wheels and unusually large 18 in × 26 in (457 mm × 660 mm) cylinders. The valves were above the cylinders, and operated by Stephenson link motion via rocking shafts; although the cylinders were between the frames, the motion was mounted outside the driving wheels. The wheelbase was 30 ft 0 in (9.14 m). It was the only 4-2-4T locomotive built by the Great Western Railway (though not the only such tank locomotive operated by the Great Western, which inherited some from the Bristol and Exeter Railway). It did little work as it was prone to derailing, indeed it did this in front of William Dean on its first trial move out of the shed. The order (Swindon Lot 54) had been for two locomotives (works nos. 844/5); the second 4-2-4T, intended to be numbered 10, would have differed from no. 9 in being fitted with Joy valve gear, but it was cancelled following the problems with no. 9. The cylinders and Joy valve gear were not wasted, as they were used in a different experimental locomotive, no. 1833.

In 1884, no. 9 was rebuilt as an unconventional 2-2-2 tender locomotive. Some of the old components were retained, such as the frames (suitably shortened), cylinders, outside Stephenson valve gear and driving wheels, but the round-top boiler and carrying wheels were new. The wheelbase was 18 ft 0 in (5.49 m). In 1890, it was again rebuilt, this time with more standard double frames, 7 ft 0 in (2.13 m) driving wheels and inside valve gear similar in style to the Queen Class. The wheelbase was increased to 18 ft 3 in (5.56 m). In this guise it was named Victoria in honour of Queen Victoria. A Belpaire boiler was fitted in 1902, and the locomotive was withdrawn in 1905.

=== No. 10 ===
A 2-2-2 locomotive built in 1886 that, as with number 9, was rebuilt in 1890 to be similar to the Queen class. In this latter guise it was named Royal Albert in honour of Prince Albert, husband of Queen Victoria. It was withdrawn in 1906.

=== No. 13 ===
Tank locomotive number 13 (Swindon Lot no. 72, works no. 1094) first appeared in 1886 as a 2-4-2WT, or well tank: the two water tanks were mounted one below the boiler and between the frames, the other at the back under the coal bunker. In this form it worked on the St Ives branch and also on the Abingdon branch.

In 1897, it was rebuilt as a 4-4-0ST, or saddle tank. The large bunker and rear water tank were reduced in size. This allowed the rear carrying wheels to be removed, and a saddle tank fitted over the boiler. The frames were shortened at the rear and extended at the front to allow the fitting of a bogie instead of the leading axle. It continued to work on various branch lines, being loaned to the Liskeard and Looe Railway and later continuing to work on the Looe branch. It was also recorded on the Highworth branch line, before finally moving to Swindon Works, where it shunted for three or four years, and from where it was withdrawn in 1926.

=== Nos. 14 and 16 ===
Two rather more conventional 2-4-0 express locomotives were turned out in 1888 (Swindon Lot no. 74, works nos. 1115–6) and ran on the broad gauge. They were similar to the standard gauge 3206 Barnum' Class turned out in 1889 but with larger 7 ft 0 1/2 in (2,146 mm) in driving wheels. They were built for the 3 p.m. express from Bristol to Swindon, and although they ceased work after broad gauge ended in May 1892, they were put into store instead of withdrawn.

They were renewed as standard gauge 4-4-0 locomotives in 1894, nos. 14 and 16 of the Armstrong class.

=== Nos. 34 and 35 ===
Two 0-4-2ST built in 1890 (Swindon Lot no. 81, works nos. 1179–80), these were smaller than the contemporary 3521 class, having 4-foot (1.22 m) driving wheels. They were altered to 0-4-4T in 1895, and withdrawn in 1908 and 1906 respectively.

=== No. 36 ===
No. 36 was a double-framed 4-6-0 built in 1896 (Swindon Lot no. 106, works no. 1551). It was withdrawn in 1905.

=== No. 1490 ===
In 1898, after Churchward had become Dean's assistant, a solitary 4-4-0PT was built at Swindon (Lot no. 114, works no. 1702), and was the first GWR locomotive with pannier tanks. It had 4 ft 7 1/2 in (1,410 mm) driving wheels, and was intended as the prototype of a new class for working over the Metropolitan Railway, but was both unstable and too heavy. After a few years spent shunting, it was sold in 1907 by the GWR to the Ebbw Vale Steel, Iron & Coal Co. In 1908 it came into the possession of the Brecon and Merthyr Tydfil Junction Railway, which numbered it 35, but sold it again in 1916 to the Cramlington Colliery Co. It was eventually scrapped in 1929.

=== No. 1833 ===
This was originally an 0-6-0T built in November 1882. It used the cylinders and Joy valve gear that had been intended for the second 4-2-4T (see no. 9) that had been cancelled, and was given the same works number (845) although a new order was raised (Swindon Lot 58). No. 1833 worked as a tank locomotive for less than two years: it was found that the amount of water in the tanks affected the working of the valve gear, and so in August 1884 it was taken out of service, altered to a tender locomotive, and returned to traffic in October 1884. In this form it worked until March 1906, when it was scrapped.
