= GWR 3400 Class =

The Great Western Railway did not have a 3400 Class of locomotives, but members of five other classes were numbered in the range 3400–3499 at various times.

- 3300 Class 4-4-0 Bulldog and Bird
- 3700 Class 4-4-0 City
- 3800 Class 4-4-0 Churchward County
- 4100 Class 4-4-0 Atbara
- 9400 Class 0-6-0PT pannier tanks
