= 3400 class =

3400 class or Class 3400 may refer to:

- GWR 3400 Class (disambiguation)
- NS Class 3400, diesel multiple units
- Queensland Railways 3300/3400 class, electric locomotives
