= Flower class =

Flower class may refer to:

- Flower-class schooner, Bermudian-built schooners of the Royal Navy
- Flower-class sloop, sloops of the Royal Navy serving in World War I
- Flower-class corvette, corvettes of the Royal Navy, Royal Canadian Navy and other navies, serving in World War II
- GWR 4100 Class, steam locomotives of the Great Western Railway
