= 3440 =

3440 may refer to:

- A.D. 3440, a year in the 4th millennium CE
- 3440 BC, a year in the 4th millennium BCE
- 3440, a number in the 3000 (number) range

== Other uses ==
- 3440 Stampfer, an asteroid in the Asteroid Belt, the 3440th asteroid registered
- Texas Farm to Market Road 3440, a state highway
- GWR 3700 Class 3440 City of Truro (engine #3440), a steam locomotive preserved at the GWR Museum in Swindon

== See also ==
- H.R. 3440 (disambiguation)
