= GWR 7 (Armstrong) Class =

Class of British steam locomotives

Armstrong Class
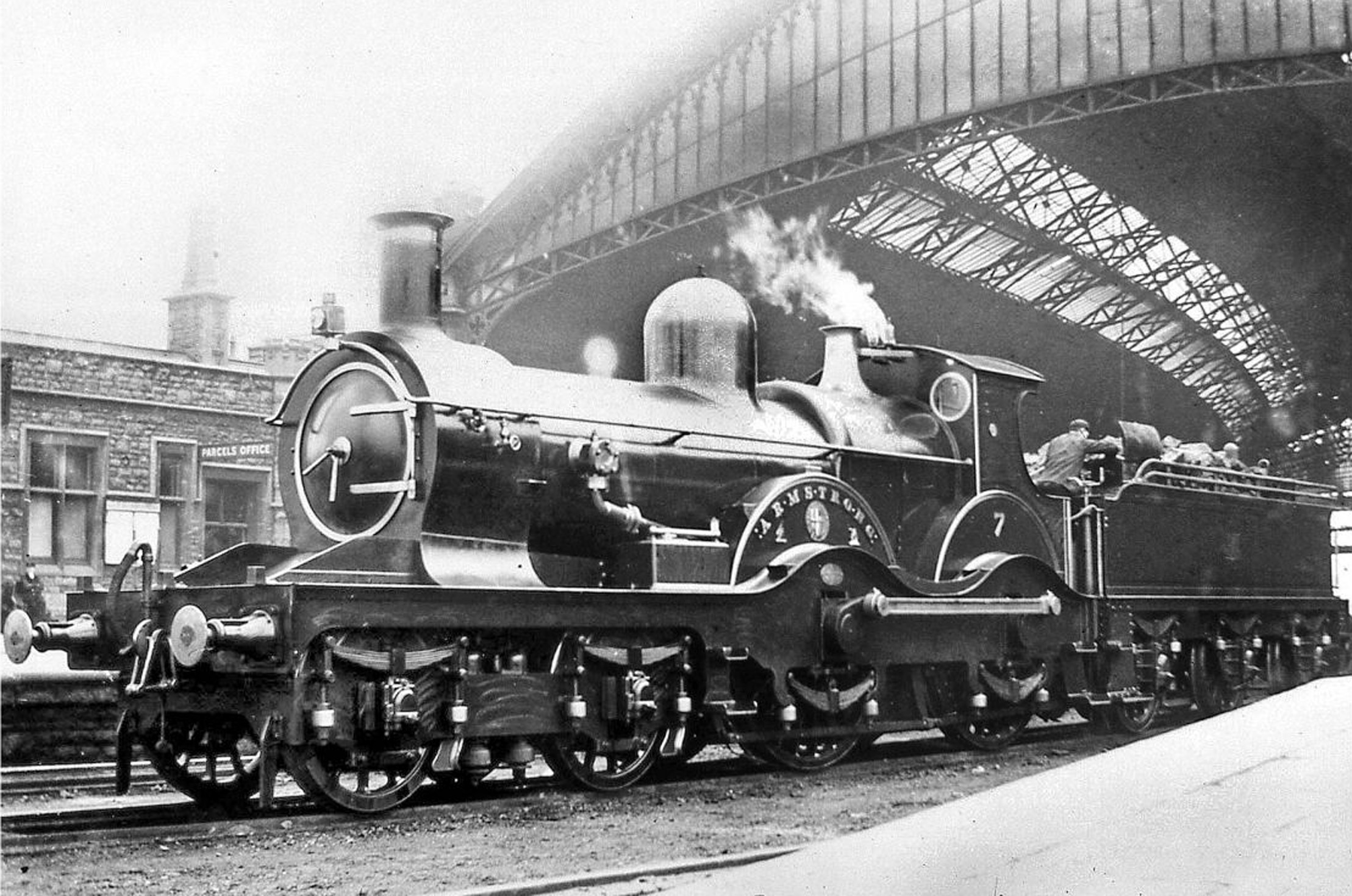
- No. 7 Armstrong c. 1900
Type and origin
- Power type: Steam
- Designer: William Dean
- Builder: Great Western Railway’s Swindon Works
Specifications
- Configuration
  - Whyte: 4-4-0
  - UIC: 2′B
- Gauge: 4 ft 8 1/2 in (1,435 mm) standard gauge
- Leading dia.: 4 ft 1.5 in (1.257 m)
- Driver dia.: 7 ft 0.5 in (2.146 m)
- Wheelbase: 23 ft 0 in (7.01 m)
- Cylinder size: 20 in × 26 in (508 mm × 660 mm)

The William Dean 7 or Armstrong Class refers to a group of four prototype 4-4-0 double-frame locomotives built at the Swindon Works of the Great Western Railway in 1894.

== History ==
They were nominal renewals of four of Dean's "experimental locomotives", Nos. 7, 8, 14 and 16. Had it not been for the recent derailing of one of his 3001 Class 2-2-2s in Box Tunnel, these engines would probably have been rebuilt as 2-2-2s. They ultimately emerged as double-framed four-coupled engines with 7 ft 0.5 in (2.146 m) driving wheels and a front bogie similar to that used on the 3031 Class.

== Names ==
The four locomotives, which with their double-curved running plates were exceptionally handsome, were named as follows:

- 7 Charles Saunders (first), Armstrong (second)
- 8 Gooch
- 14 Charles Saunders
- 16 Brunel

== Use ==
The four locos initially ran between London and Bristol, but after about 1910 they were moved to Wolverhampton and worked north from there. Later between 1915 and 1923, all four were rebuilt with 6 ft 8.5 in (2.04 m) driving wheels and Standard No. 2 boilers, and became members of the Flower class. They were renumbered 4169-4172.

== Sources ==
- le Fleming, H. M. (October 1954). White, D. E. (ed.). The Locomotives of the Great Western Railway, part seven: Dean's Larger Tender Engines. RCTS. ISBN 0-901115-18-5. OCLC 655235293.
- Nock, O.S. (1977). Standard Gauge Great Western 4-4-0s: Part 1: Inside Cylinder Classes 1894-1910. Newton Abbot: David & Charles. ISBN 0-7153-7411-7.
- Russell, J.H. (1999) [1975]. A Pictorial Record of Great Western Engines: Volume 1: Gooch, Armstrong and Dean Locomotives. Shepperton: Oxford Publishing Company. ISBN 0-86093-398-9.
