= GWR 103 President =

Class of 2 4-4-2 locomotives

GWR 103 President and GWR 104 Alliance
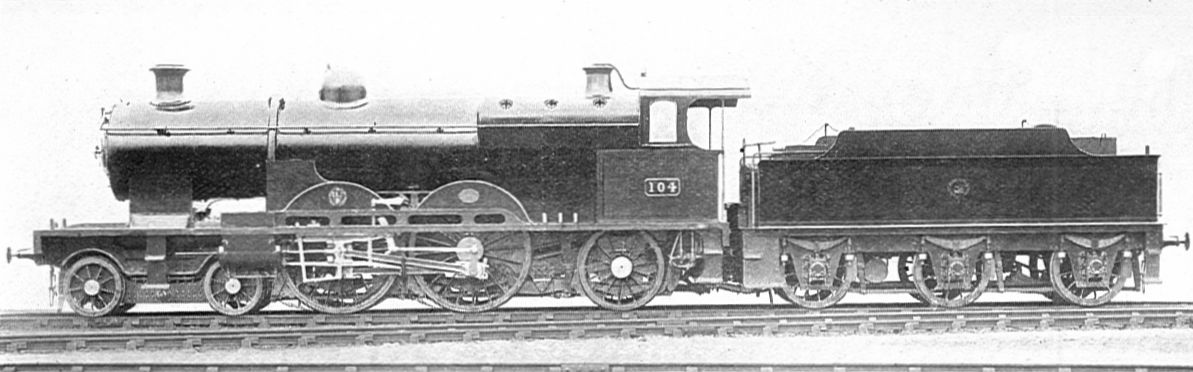
- 104, Alliance
Type and origin
- Power type: Steam
- Designer: G.J. Churchward
- Builder: Société Alsacienne de Constructions Mécaniques
- Order number: Swindon Lot 157
- Serial number: SACM: 5601–5602; Swindon 2126–2127
- Build date: 1905
Specifications
- Configuration
  - Whyte: 4-4-2
  - UIC: 2′B1 n4v
- Gauge: 4 ft 8 1/2 in (1,435 mm) standard gauge
- Leading dia.: 3 ft 2 in (965 mm)
- Driver dia.: 6 ft 8 1/2 in (2,045 mm)
- Trailing dia.: 4 ft 8 3/8 in (1,432 mm)
- Fuel type: Coal
- Cylinders: Four – compound: two HP outside; two LP inside
- High-pressure cylinder: 14 3/16 in × 25 3/16 in (360 mm × 640 mm)
- Low-pressure cylinder: 23 5/8 in × 25 3/16 in (600 mm × 640 mm)
- Valve gear: Walschaerts
Career
- Operators: Great Western Railway
- Numbers: 103 and 104
- Official name: President and Alliance
- Withdrawn: 1926
- Disposition: Both scrapped

President, number 103, and Alliance, number 104 were locomotives of the Great Western Railway. George Jackson Churchward, Chief Mechanical Engineer of the Great Western Railway, was given authority to purchase three French de Glehn-du Bousquet four-cylinder compound locomotives, in order to evaluate the benefits of compounding. The first locomotive, No. 102 La France, was delivered in 1903. Two further locomotives, Nos. 103 and 104, were purchased in 1905. These were similar to the Paris-Orleans Railway's 3001 class, and slightly larger than 102. As with no. 102, these were built by Société Alsacienne de Constructions Mécaniques.

They had two low-pressure cylinders fitted between the frames, and two high-pressure cylinders outside. The low-pressure cylinders drove the front driving wheels while the high-pressure cylinders drove the rear driving wheels. An external steam pipe was mounted just in front of the dome, looking similar in appearance to a top feed. In 1907 No. 104 was fitted with an unsuperheated Swindon No. 1 boiler, President itself being similarly reboilered in February 1910 and receiving a superheated boiler in January 1914. In 1926, the three locomotives were based at Oxford shed. In practice, they did not provide any significant improvement in either performance or economy compared to No 171 Albion, Churchward's prototype 4-6-0, which was converted to a 4-4-2 specifically for comparison with the French locomotives.

== Bibliography ==
- Allcock, N. J.; Davies, F. K.; le Fleming, H. M.; Maskelyne, J. N.; Reed, P. J. T.; Tabor, F. J. (1968) [1951]. White, D. E. (ed.). The Locomotives of the Great Western Railway, part one: Preliminary Survey. Kenilworth: RCTS.
- Nock, O.S. (1975). The Pre-grouping Scene, No.1: The Great Western. Surrey: Ian Allan. ISBN 0-7110-0586-9.
- Rogers, H.C.B. (1975). G.J. Churchward: a Locomotive Biography. London: George Allen & Unwin. ISBN 0-04-385061-8.
- Haresnape, Brian; Swain, Alec (1993) [1976]. Churchward Locomotives. Surrey: Ian Allan. ISBN 0-7110-0697-0.
- le Fleming, H.M. (November 1960). White, D.E. (ed.). The Locomotives of the Great Western Railway, part eight: Modern Passenger Classes (2nd ed.). RCTS.
