= GWR 102 La France =

French-built English steam locomotive

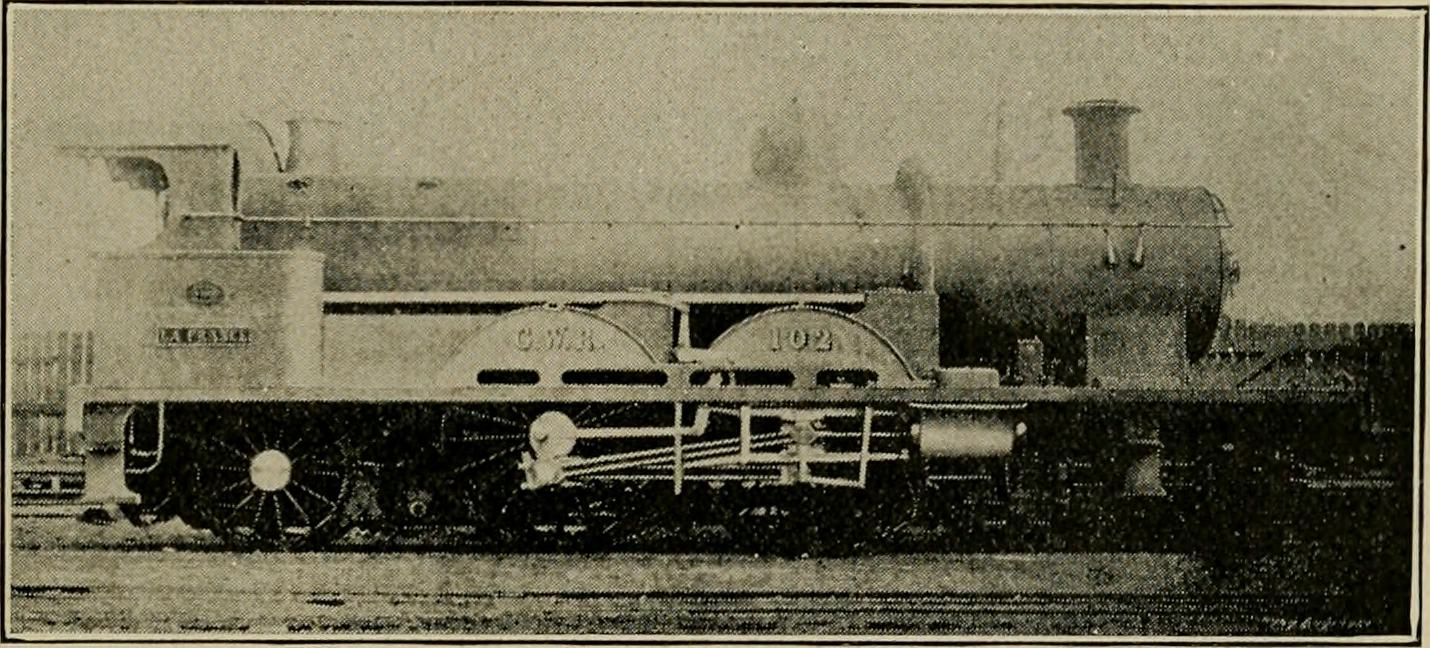
Type and origin
- Power type: Steam
- Designer: Alfred de Glehn, Gaston du Bousquet
- Builder: Société Alsacienne de Constructions Mécaniques
- Order number: Swindon Lot 146
- Serial number: SACM: 5409; Swindon: 2025
- Build date: 1903
Specifications
- Configuration
  - Whyte: 4-4-2
  - UIC: 2′B1 n4v
- Gauge: 4 ft 8 1/2 in (1,435 mm) standard gauge
- Leading dia.: 2 ft 11 7/8 in (911 mm)
- Driver dia.: 6 ft 8 1/2 in (2,045 mm)
- Trailing dia.: 4 ft 7 7/8 in (1,419 mm)
- Length: 63 ft 1 in (19.23 m)
- Loco weight: 64 long tons 13 cwt (144,800 lb or 65.7 t)
- Fuel type: Coal
- Boiler pressure: 227 lbf/in^{2} (1.57 MPa; 16.0 kgf/cm^{2});
- Cylinders: Four – compound: two HP outside; two LP inside
- High-pressure cylinder: 13 3/8 in × 25 3/16 in (340 mm × 640 mm)
- Low-pressure cylinder: 22 1/16 in × 25 3/16 in (560 mm × 640 mm)
- Valve gear: Walschaerts
Performance figures
- Tractive effort: 23,710 lbf (105.47 kN)
Career
- Operators: Great Western Railway
- Numbers: 102
- Official name: La France
- Delivered: October 1903
- Withdrawn: October 1926

La France, number 102, was a locomotive of the Great Western Railway. It was bought by George Jackson Churchward to evaluate French locomotive practice, and particularly the effect of compounding.

== History ==
On succeeding William Dean as Chief Mechanical Engineer of the Great Western Railway (GWR), G. J. Churchward planned the introduction of a series of locomotives designed to tackle the South Devon Banks. Churchward looked at the best practice from both Europe and America, and was impressed by the performance of the de Glehn compounds running on the Nord railway in France. A single locomotive, built specifically for the GWR by Société Alsacienne de Constructions Mécaniques on the de Glehn principles was delivered in October 1903. This locomotive was numbered 102 and named La France although the makers plates had to be moved from the cabside to the front splasher to allow the number to be fitted in the usual GWR position.

== Design ==
La France was visibly not a GWR engine, although fitted with a Swindon chimney and paired with a standard tender, as immediately recognisable from firebox and the cab. Initially the locomotive was painted black, looking more LNWR than GWR, but it was repainted in 1905 into the standard GWR green livery. La France had two low pressure cylinders fitted between the frames, and two high pressure cylinders outside. The low pressure cylinders drove the front driving wheels while the high pressure cylinders drove the rear driving wheels. Also notable was the external steam pipe mounted just in front of the dome, and looking rather similar in appearance to a top feed.

== Operation ==
La France was put to work on important expresses in order to fully evaluate it in operation, and worked turn and turn about with GWR 4-4-0 express locos such as the City class and Atbara class. No.102 hauled the inaugural down Cornish Riviera Express from Paddington on 1 July 1904, this becoming a regular turn which required a non-stop run to Plymouth. In 1913 a top feed and new steam pipes were fitted, and then in 1916 the boiler was replaced by a GWR standard No.1 boiler. In 1926, along with two other French locomotives 103 President and 104 Alliance, 102 was based at Oxford shed. La France was withdrawn in October 1926 having achieved 728,031 miles.

In practice, La France did not provide any significant improvement in either performance or economy compared to No 171 Albion, Churchward's prototype 4-6-0 which was converted to a 4-4-2 specifically for comparison with the French locomotive. Some other benefits were found, however, particularly a much smoother ride and also a reduction in the loads on the rods and axleboxes due to the drive being split between the two driving axles. Despite being remembered for not changing Churchward's views about using a 4-6-0 wheel arrangement for his locomotives, and failing to demonstrate the claimed significant benefits of compounding, La France did leave a lasting legacy on British steam locomotive design. Churchward adopted the de Glehn bogie design for his locomotives, and its success endured with its use by William Stanier on the LMS and subsequently by Robert Riddles on the BR standard designs. It also found its way onto Southern Railway locomotives.
