= Wellington railway station (Somerset) =

Disused railway station in Somerset, England

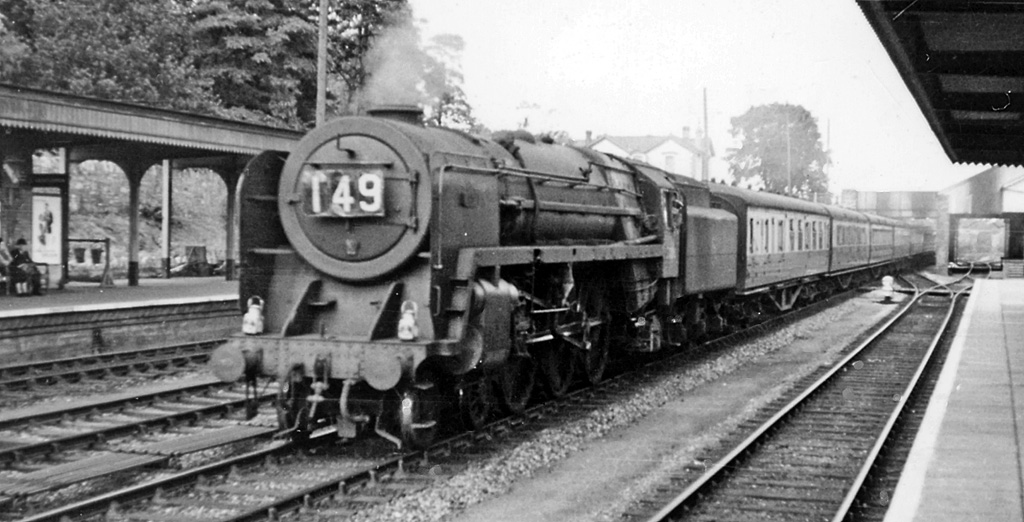
- An express train passing through the station in 1954.

General information
- Location: Wellington, Somerset; England
- Coordinates: 50.983784°N 3.240970°W

Other information
- Status: Disused

History
- Original company: Bristol and Exeter Railway
- Pre-grouping: Great Western Railway
- Post-grouping: Great Western Railway

Key dates
- 1 May 1843: Opened
- 5 October 1964: Closed
Location

Wellington railway station was a former railway station located in Wellington in Somerset on the Bristol–Exeter line. It served the town between 1843 and 1964, when it was closed as part of the Beeching cuts. In recent years proposals to reopen the station have been advanced. It was known as Wellington (Somerset) to distinguish it from Wellington Station in Shropshire.

== History ==
A station was opened at Wellington when the line reached the town on 1 May 1843. Initially the next station west Beam Bridge functioned as the terminus of the line, until the route to Exeter was completed in 1844. Beam Bridge then closed and Burlescombe, just across the border in Devon, became the next station west. Heading eastwards the next station was Norton Fitzwarren followed by Taunton.

It was a typical Brunel design but was rebuilt in 1932 when two loop lines were put in. This entailed the platforms being moved back to accommodate the widened lines. These platforms are clearly visible and a goods shed still stands on the east side of the line at the Taunton end of the station, although the station closed on 5 October 1964.

Wellington was an important station as it stood at the foot of a steep incline. Banking locomotives were kept here, ready to assist heavy westbound trains up to Whiteball Tunnel.

== Reopening ==
Government funding was announced in October 2021 for Somerset Council, Network Rail and the Department for Transport to work on plans for a new station at Wellington at a new location near Nynehead Road, east of the previous site. It would only be served by Great Western Railway services. The construction of the new station was cast into doubt in 2024 after the government scrapped the 'Restoring Your Railway' programme however funding was confirmed for the station following a government spending review in June 2025.

A new spine road to provide station access and the 'station square' are to be constructed under a Section 106 agreement with West of England Developments. This work was intended to be completed during 2026 and construction on the new station is expected to begin in Spring 2027.

== Bibliography ==
- Jenkins, Stanley C. & Loader, Martin. The Great Western Railway Volume Two Bristol to Plymouth. Amberley Publishing, 2014.
- MacDermot, Edward Terence. History of the Great Western Railway, Volume 2. I. Allan, 1964.

Preceding station	Historical railways	Following station
Burlescombe	Great Western Railway; Bristol–Exeter line	Norton Fitzwarren

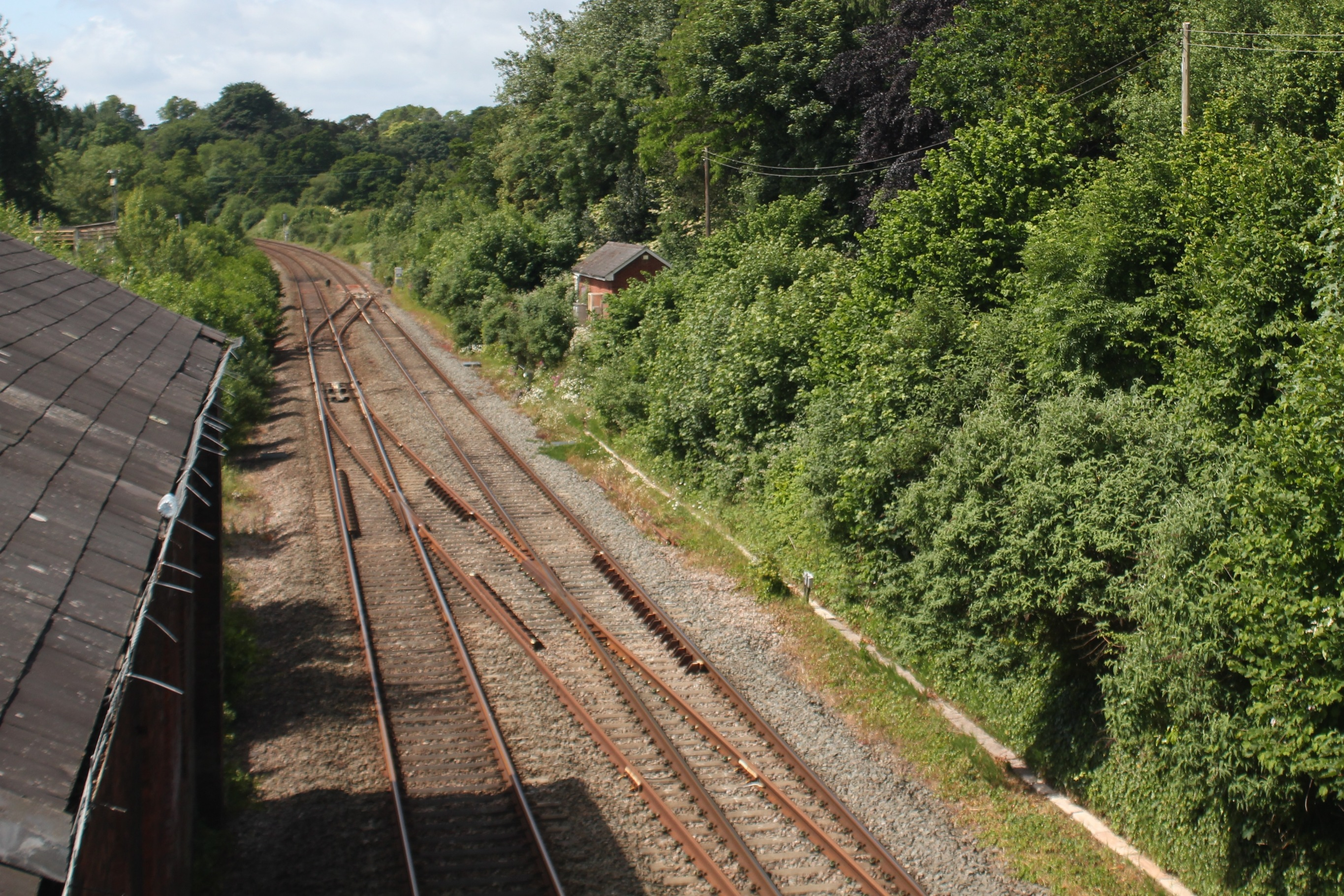
The station site in 2025 with the goods shed on the left.
