= Charles Rous-Marten =

New Zealand journalist and British railway writer and recorder

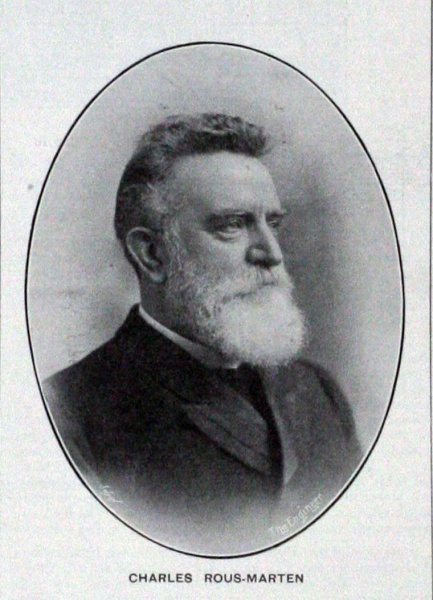
Photograph of Charles Rous-Marten from his Obituary in The Engineer

Charles Rous-Marten (1842–1908) was a New Zealand journalist and British railway writer and recorder.

He was born in England. At the age of 16 his family emigrated to New Zealand, settling in Southland. In 1864 he was appointed Meteorological Director of Southland Province, a position he held until 1870. He was employed as a journalist with The Evening Post in Wellington about 1876 and was later editor, resigning in 1884. He was editor of The New Zealand Times, also in Wellington, from 1885 to 1890. In that year he was appointed London correspondent for a number of leading New Zealand newspapers in the New Zealand Associated Press, which he continued to do until shortly before he died.

He took a close interest in railways over many years and in 1884 and 1885 he did a thorough study of the British rail network, involving around 40,000 miles of travel. In 1887 the results were embodied in a report to the New Zealand Minister of Public Works entitled Notes on the Railways of Great Britain, which received favourable reviews.

He is chiefly known for recording a speed of 102.3 mph on the 'Ocean Mail' special from Plymouth to London hauled by GWR locomotive 3440 City of Truro on 9 May 1904, the first time that a steam locomotive was recorded to have achieved 100 mph.

Between the years of 1902 and 1908 he wrote a series of articles for The Railway Magazine on British locomotive practice and performance. In 1990, these were collated and reprinted in book form.

He married Miss Emily Jane Hickson in 1876; there were no children.
