= GWR 3206 Class =

Class of British steam locomotives

Type and origin
- Power type: Steam
- Designer: William Dean
- Builder: GWR
- Order number: 75
- Serial number: 1137–1156
- Build date: 1889
- Total produced: 20
Specifications
- Configuration
  - Whyte: 2-4-0
- Gauge: 4 ft 8 1/2 in (1,435 mm) standard gauge
- Driver dia.: 6 ft 1 1/2 in (1.867 m)
- Fuel type: Coal
- Boiler: GWR Duke
- Cylinders: Two, inside
- Cylinder size: 18 in × 24 in (457 mm × 610 mm)
Career
- Operators: Great Western Railway
- Numbers: 3206–3225
- Disposition: All scrapped

The 3206 or Barnum Class consisted of 20 locomotives built at Swindon Works for the Great Western Railway in 1889, and was William Dean's most successful 2-4-0 design. Numbered 3206–3225, they were the last GWR locos built at Swindon with "sandwich" frames (outside frames consisting of timber between two sheets of steel).

== Alterations ==
They underwent various alterations during their working lives, such as thicker tyres giving slightly larger wheels, the gradual adoption of cylinders with a 26 in (660 mm) stroke, and larger diameter boilers of various sorts, as was usual at this period. Between 1910 and 1915, some of the class received taller chimneys resembling those of the Dean Singles.

== Use ==
The Barnums were "express mixed traffic engines" and to start with worked from Swindon to Gloucester and South Wales, and to Weymouth. A few subsequently went to the Northern Division, but in the early 20th century most were at Bristol, Oxford, Swindon and Westbury. By the 1920s they were reduced to branch-line work, apart from a brief spell on the Cambrian main line, and all were withdrawn by early 1937.
