= GWR 3700 Class 3440 City of Truro =

Preserved British 4-4-0 locomotive

GWR 3440 City of Truro
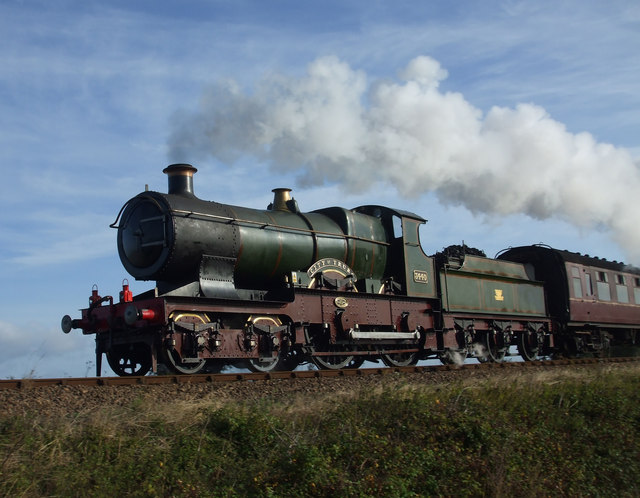
- GWR 3440 City of Truro
Type and origin
- Power type: Steam
- Builder: GWR Swindon Works
- Serial number: 2000
- Build date: April 1903
Specifications
- Configuration
  - Whyte: 4-4-0
  - UIC: 2′B n2, later 2′B h2
- Gauge: 4 ft 8 1/2 in (1,435 mm)
- Leading dia.: 3 ft 2 in (0.965 m)
- Driver dia.: 6 ft 8 1/2 in (2.045 m)
- Wheelbase: 8 ft 1/2 in (2.451 m)
- Loco weight: 55 long tons 6 cwt (123,900 lb or 56.2 t)
- Total weight: 92 long tons 1 cwt (206,200 lb or 93.5 t)
- Fuel type: Coal
- Fuel capacity: 5 tons
- Water cap.: 3,600 imp gal (16,000 L; 4,300 US gal)
- Boiler: GWR Standard No. 4
- Cylinders: Two, inside
- Cylinder size: 18 in × 26 in (457 mm × 660 mm)
- Valve gear: Stephenson valve gear
- Valve type: Slide valves
- Loco brake: Steam
- Train brakes: Vacuum
Performance figures
- Tractive effort: 17,800 lbf (79.2 kN)
Career
- Operators: Great Western Railway
- Class: 3700, "City" class
- Numbers: 3440, renumbered 3717 in 1912
- Official name: City of Truro
- Retired: 1931
- Restored: 1957, 1984 & 2004
- Current owner: National Railway Museum
- Disposition: Static display

GWR 3700 Class 3440 City of Truro is a 4-4-0 steam locomotive built in 1903 for the Great Western Railway (GWR) at Swindon Works to a design by George Jackson Churchward. It was partially rebuilt in 1911 and 1915, and renumbered 3717 in 1912. Although it is a point of contention, some believe the locomotive to be the first to attain a speed of 100 miles per hour (160.9 km/h) during a run from Plymouth to London Paddington in 1904.

== Construction and modifications ==
The locomotive was the eighth of a batch of ten locomotives forming part of the GWR 3700 (or 'City') Class, and was delivered from Swindon Works in May 1903. All ten were named after cities on the GWR system; this batch was originally numbered 3433–42, City of Truro being 3440; like most GWR 4-4-0s, they were renumbered in December 1912, this batch becoming 3710–19 of which City of Truro became 3717. The locomotives were fitted with superheaters in 1910–12, City of Truro being so treated in September 1911. This changed its appearance quite noticeably, as it gained a longer smokebox. Most were later given piston valves instead of their original slide valves, City of Truro in November 1915.

== Speed record ==
City of Truro was timed at 8.8 seconds between two quarter-mile posts whilst hauling the "Ocean Mails" special from Plymouth to London Paddington on 9 May 1904. This timing was recorded from the train by Charles Rous-Marten, who wrote for The Railway Magazine and other journals. If exact, this time would correspond to a speed of 102.3 mph (164.6 km/h); but Rous-Marten's stopwatch read in multiples of 1/5 second, so the next possible longer time it could register was 9 seconds, corresponding to exactly 100 mph.

Initially, mindful of the need to preserve their reputation for safety, the railway company allowed only the overall timings for the run to be put into print; neither The Times report of the following day nor Rous-Marten's article in The Railway Magazine of June 1904 mentioned the maximum speed. However, the morning after the run two local Plymouth newspapers did report that the train had reached a speed between 99 and 100 miles an hour whilst descending Wellington Bank, Somerset. This claim was based on the stopwatch timings of a postal worker, William Kennedy, who was also on the train.

Rous-Marten first published the maximum speed in 1905, though he did not name the locomotive or railway company:

On one occasion when special experimental tests were being made with an engine having 6 ft. 8 in. coupled wheels hauling a load of approximately 150 tons behind the tender down a gradient of 1 in 90, I personally recorded a rate of no less than 102.3 miles an hour for a single quarter-mile, which was covered in 8.8 seconds, exactly 100 miles an hour for half a mile which occupied 18 seconds, 96.7 miles an hour for a whole mile run in 37.2 seconds; five successive quarter-miles were run respectively in 10 seconds, 9.8 seconds, 9.4 seconds, 9.2 seconds and 8.8 seconds. This I have reason to believe to be the highest railway speed ever authentically recorded. I need hardly add that the observations were made with the utmost possible care, and with the advantage of previous knowledge that the experiment was to be made, consequently without the disadvantage of unpreparedness that usually attaches itself to speed observations made in a merely casual way in an ordinary passenger train. The performance was certainly an epoch-making one. In a previous trial with another engine of the same class, a maximum of 95.6 miles an hour was reached.

— C Rous-Marten: p. 2118, Bulletin of the International Railway Congress – October 1905

Before his death in 1908, Rous-Marten did name the locomotive as City of Truro. Official confirmation from the Great Western Railway came in 1922, when they published a letter written in June 1905 by Rous-Marten to James Inglis, the general manager, giving further details of the record.

...What happened was this: when we topped the Whiteball Summit, we were still doing 63 miles an hour; when we emerged from the Whiteball Tunnel we had reached 80; thenceforward our velocity rapidly and steadily increased, the quarter-mile times diminishing from 11 sec. at the tunnel entrance to 10.6 sec., 10.2 sec., 10 sec., 9.8 sec., 9.4 sec., 9.2 sec., and finally to 8.8 sec., this last being equivalent to a rate of 102.3 miles an hour. The two quickest quarters thus occupied exactly 18 sec. for the half-mile, equal to 100 miles an hour. At this time the travelling was so curiously smooth that, but for the sound, it was difficult to believe we were moving at all...

This sequence of eight quarter-mile timings is thought to start at milepost 173, the first after the tunnel, with the maximum speed at milepost 171.

From 1922 onwards, City of Truro featured prominently in the Great Western Railway's publicity material.

Doubts over the record centre on the power of the locomotive and some contradictions in Rous-Marten's passing times. However, his milepost timings are consistent with a speed of 100 mph or just over. The latest research examines the evidence and uses computer simulation of the locomotive performance to show that a speed of 100 mph was possible but John Heaton and Bill Hemstock's exhaustive research conclude the engine probably peaked at just under 99 mph around milepost 168.

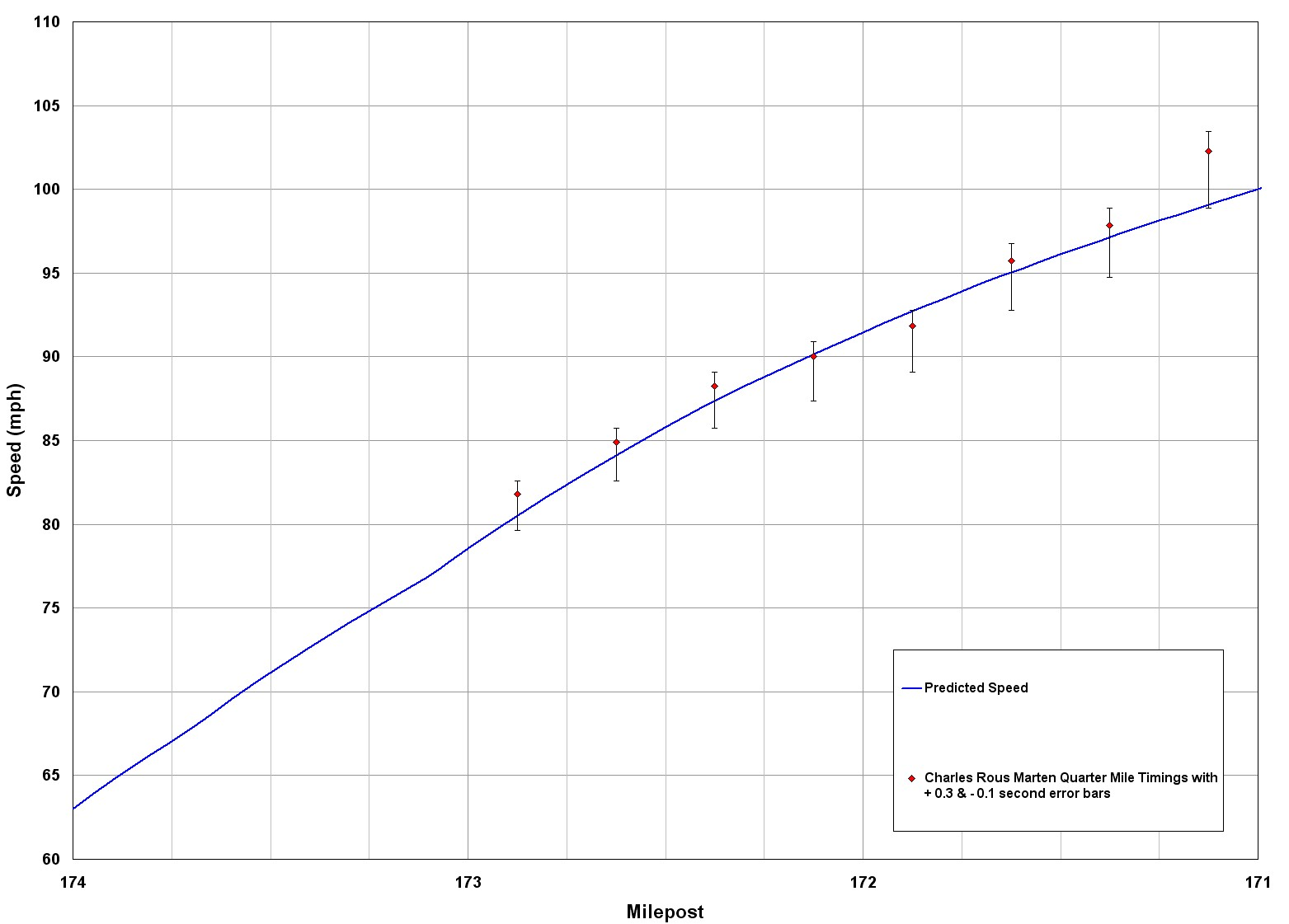
A comparison of a computer simulation of City of Truro's acceleration to 100 mph with Charles Rous Marten's quarter-mile stopwatch timings.

This record was set before any car or aeroplane had attained such a speed. However, in May 1904, City of Truro was not the fastest vehicle in the world, as 130 mph (210 km/h) had been reached the previous year on an experimental electric railway near Berlin. An earlier, unconfirmed run of over 100 mph is recorded from 1893 in the US, by New York Central and Hudson River Railroad 4-4-0 locomotive No. 999. This claim has little supporting evidence; for example, unlike City of Truro, there are no timings showing the acceleration up to 100 mph. Even some contemporary American technical journals doubted that such a high speed had been attained: "Many are disposed to receive with doubt the statement that on 9 May the locomotive No. 999 of the New York Central railroad ran at the speed of 100 miles an hour, or that on a subsequent date she ran a single mile in 32 seconds." J P Pearson travelled on the Empire State Express on 10 May 1893 and recorded a speed no higher than 81 mph, still a very respectable speed for the time.

== Preservation ==
After the 1904 speed record, 3440 continued in everyday service until it was rendered obsolete in 1931, being withdrawn from service in March that year. The historical significance of City of Truro led to the locomotive's survival after withdrawal from service, with the GWR's Chief Mechanical Engineer Charles Collett asking that the engine be preserved at the London and North Eastern Railway's Railway Museum at York when it was withdrawn in 1931, after the directors of the GWR had refused to preserve the engine at the company's expense. It was donated to the LNER, being sent from Swindon on 20 March 1931, and was subsequently displayed at the new museum in York. During World War II York was considered to be a likely bombing target so the locomotive was evacuated to the small engine shed at Sprouston railway station (near Kelso) on the Tweedmouth to St Boswells line in the Scottish Borders.

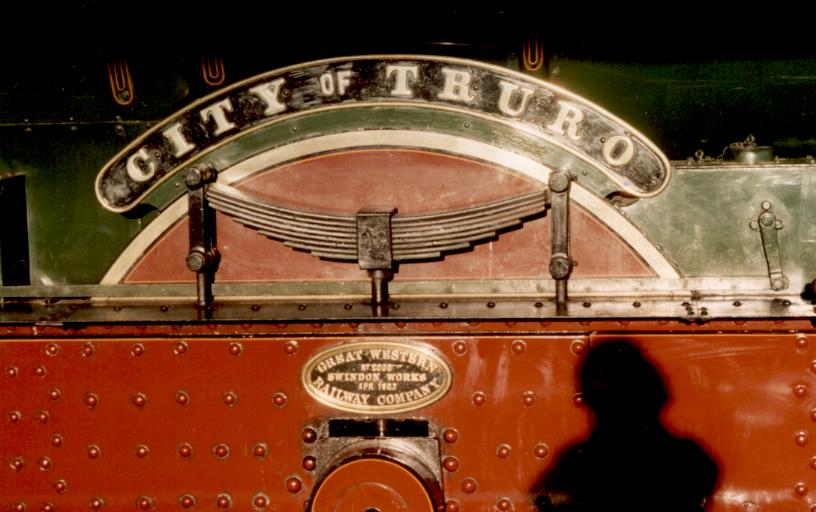
City of Truro's nameplate and worksplate, recording that it was the 2000th loco to be built at Swindon Works in April 1903

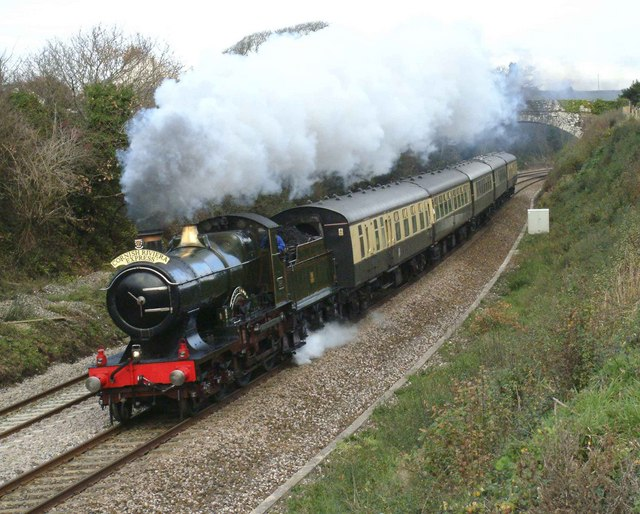
City of Truro returns to Truro

In 1957, City of Truro was returned to service by British Railways Western Region. The locomotive was based at Didcot, and was used both for hauling special excursion trains and for normal revenue services, usually on the Didcot, Newbury and Southampton line, and was renumbered back to 3440, and repainted into the ornate livery it carried at the time of its speed record in 1904. It was withdrawn for a second time in 1961. In 1962, it was taken to Swindon's GWR Museum where, renumbered back to 3717 and in plain green livery with black frames, it stayed until 1984, when it was restored for the GWR's 150th anniversary celebrations the following year. After that, it was returned to the National Railway Museum, from where it was occasionally used on main line outings. In 1989, 3440 City of Truro went over to the Netherlands for 6 weeks to represent Great Britain and the National Railway Museum in the 150th anniversary celebrations of the Netherlands railways. It was only by chance that City of Truro made an appearance on the continent as the original choice was LNER A4 Mallard which failed a boiler test. A year later 3440 made a guest appearance in an exhibition called "National Railway Museum on Tour" which visited Swindon in 1990.

The latest restoration to full working order was undertaken in 2004, at a cost of £130,000, to mark the 100th anniversary of the record-breaking run, and the locomotive has subsequently hauled several trains on UK main lines, although due to the lack of certain safety features it no longer operates on the main line.

City of Truro was subsequently based semi-permanently at the Gloucestershire Warwickshire Railway, often hauling trains between Toddington and Cheltenham Racecourse. However, it frequently left its Toddington base to visit other UK heritage railways.

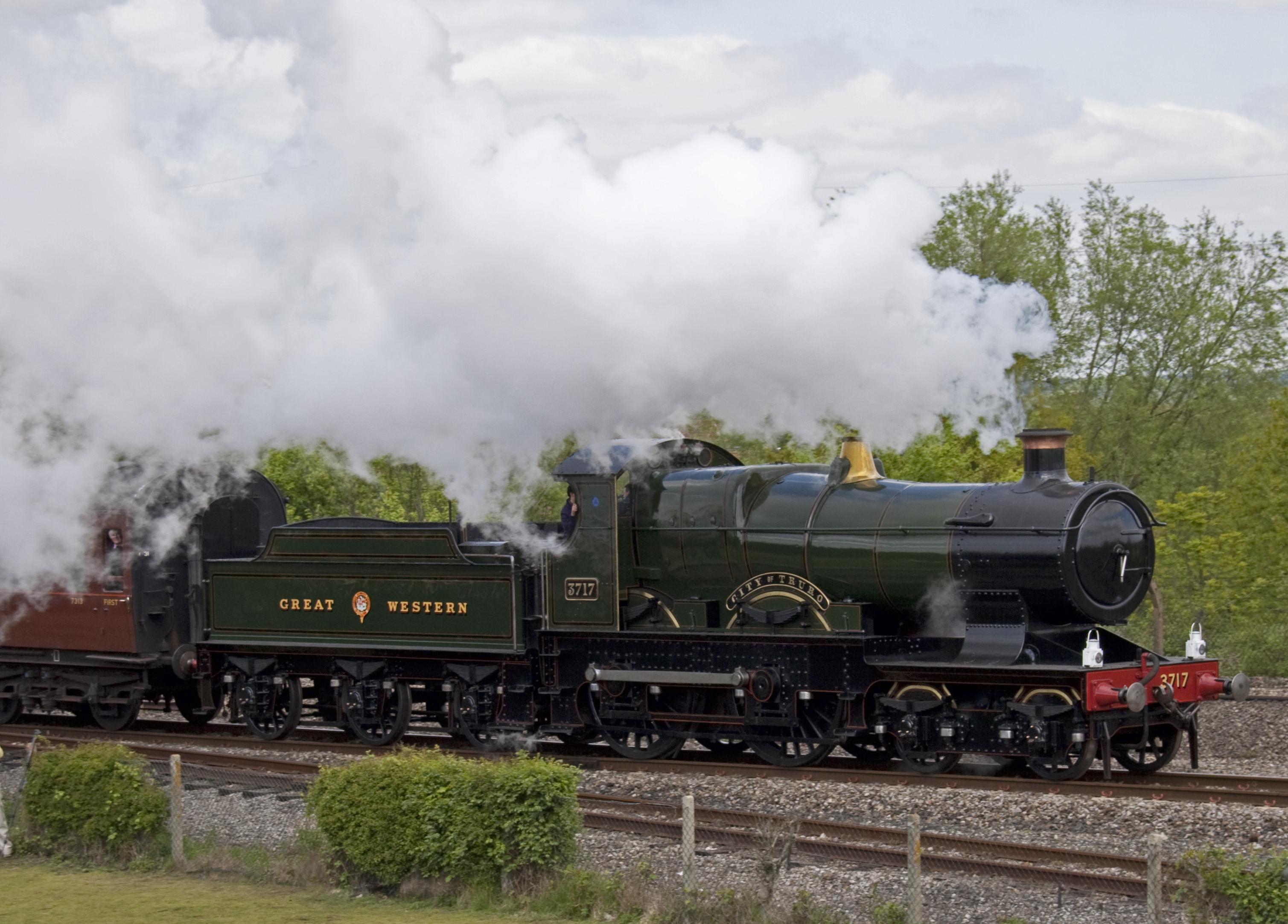
City of Truro at Didcot in 2010

In 2010, as part of the celebrations to mark the 175th anniversary of the founding of the GWR, City of Truro was repainted and took up its 3717 guise once again. This was the first time it had carried an authentic livery for its current state whilst operating in preservation.

City of Truro was withdrawn from traffic at the Bodmin & Wenford Railway in early September 2011 with serious tube leaks, and was moved to Shildon Locomotion Museum and placed on static display. It was back in service in 2012, but in early 2013 the NRM declared the locomotive was to be withdrawn ahead of its boiler ticket expiry due to a hole being discovered in one of its tubes. The NRM did state that they would repair the leaking tubes after they had restored 4472 Flying Scotsman, but after examination it was found that the locomotive required more work than first thought and was unlikely to be operational in the foreseeable future.

In late 2015, City of Truro, along with 'King' No. 6000 King George V, returned to STEAM – Museum of the Great Western Railway (located at the site of the old railway works in Swindon), and both were put on display in preparation for Swindon 175 in 2016, celebrating 175 years since the inception of Swindon as a railway town. Both locomotives were expected to remain at Swindon for five years; as of 2025 they remain there.

== In popular culture ==
City of Truro is featured as a minor character in the book Duck and the Diesel Engine, part of The Railway Series by the Rev. W. Awdry. The locomotive also appears in the television spin-off Thomas the Tank Engine and Friends. A die-cast model was released in the Ertl range.

City of Truro starred in the 1957-8 serial "Will o'the Whistle" in the D.C. Thomson comic The Wizard, in which it was used by resistance fighters after the Kushanti invasion of Britain.

== Models ==
The erstwhile Kitmaster company produced an unpowered polystyrene injection moulded model kit for 00 gauge. In late 1962, the Kitmaster brand was sold by its parent company (Rosebud Dolls) to Airfix, who transferred the moulding tools to their own factory; they re-introduced some of the former Kitmaster range, including City of Truro. In time, the moulding tools passed on to Dapol who have also produced the model kit.

== See also ==
- New York Central and Hudson River Railroad No. 999, another contender for the first steam locomotive to reach 100 mph.
- Flying Scotsman, the first locomotive to reach an authenticated 100 mph.
