= GWR No. 36 =

Prototype British steam locomotive

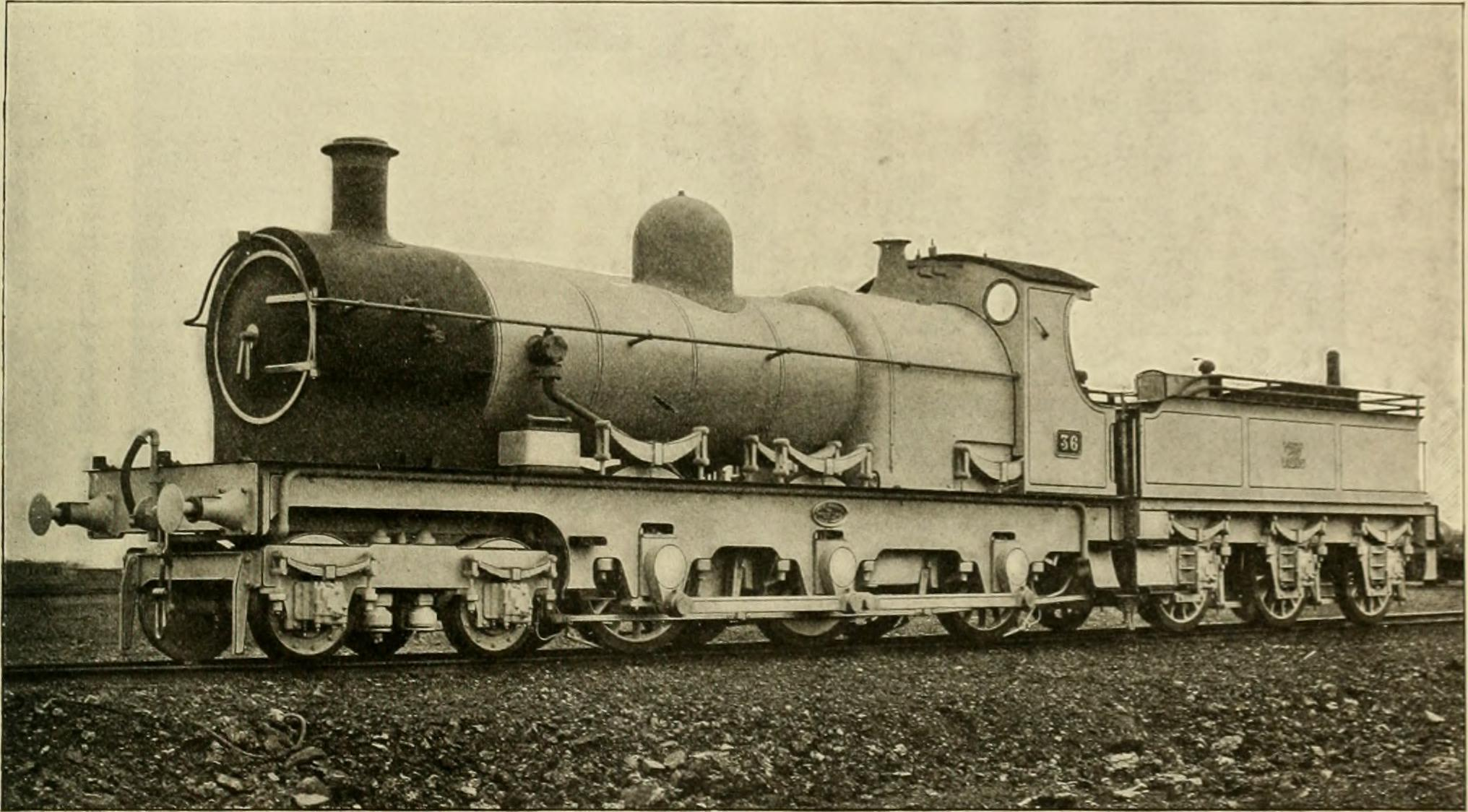
- Works photo of No. 36
Type and origin
- Power type: Steam
- Designer: William Dean
- Builder: GWR Swindon Works
- Order number: Lot 106
- Serial number: 1551
- Build date: 1896
- Total produced: 1
Specifications
- Configuration
  - Whyte: 4-6-0
- Gauge: 4 ft 8 1/2 in (1,435 mm) standard gauge
- Leading dia.: 2 ft 8 in (0.813 m)
- Driver dia.: 4 ft 7 1/2 in (1.410 m)
- Fuel type: Coal
- Firebox
  - Grate area: 35.4 sq ft (3.29 m^{2})
- Boiler pressure: 165 psi (1,140 kPa)
- Cylinders: Two, inside
- Cylinder size: 20 in × 24 in (508 mm × 610 mm)
Performance figures
- Tractive effort: 24,260 lbf (107.9 kN)
Career
- Operators: GWR
- Withdrawn: 1905
- Disposition: Scrapped in 1905

GWR No. 36 was a one-off prototype 4-6-0 steam locomotive constructed at Swindon Works for the Great Western Railway in 1896, the first 4-6-0 ever built for the GWR and one of the first in Britain. It was designed by William Dean and le Fleming comments that "the design is unusual and entirely Dean of the later period, including the only large boiler ever built entirely to his ideas."

== Design ==
No. 36 had double frames for the 4 ft 7 1/2 in (1.410 m) coupled wheels and an outside-frame bogie with 2 ft 8 in (0.813 m) wooden-centred wheels; cylinders were 20 in × 24 in (508 mm × 610 mm). The long boiler and raised round-topped firebox create a harmonious impression, and the loco acquired the nickname "The Crocodile". Among its innovative features included the use of Serve tubes.

== Use ==
Designed for heavy freights from Newport to Swindon through the Severn Tunnel, it proved itself exceptionally capable, being able to haul trains that would otherwise be double-headed. It was probably due to Dean's declining health and Churchward's increasing influence that the loco did little work away from Swindon, remained a prototype and was withdrawn in 1905 with the low mileage of 171,428 mi (275,887 km).
