= GWR 3700 Class =

Class of two-cylinder 4-4-0 locomotives

3700 "City" class
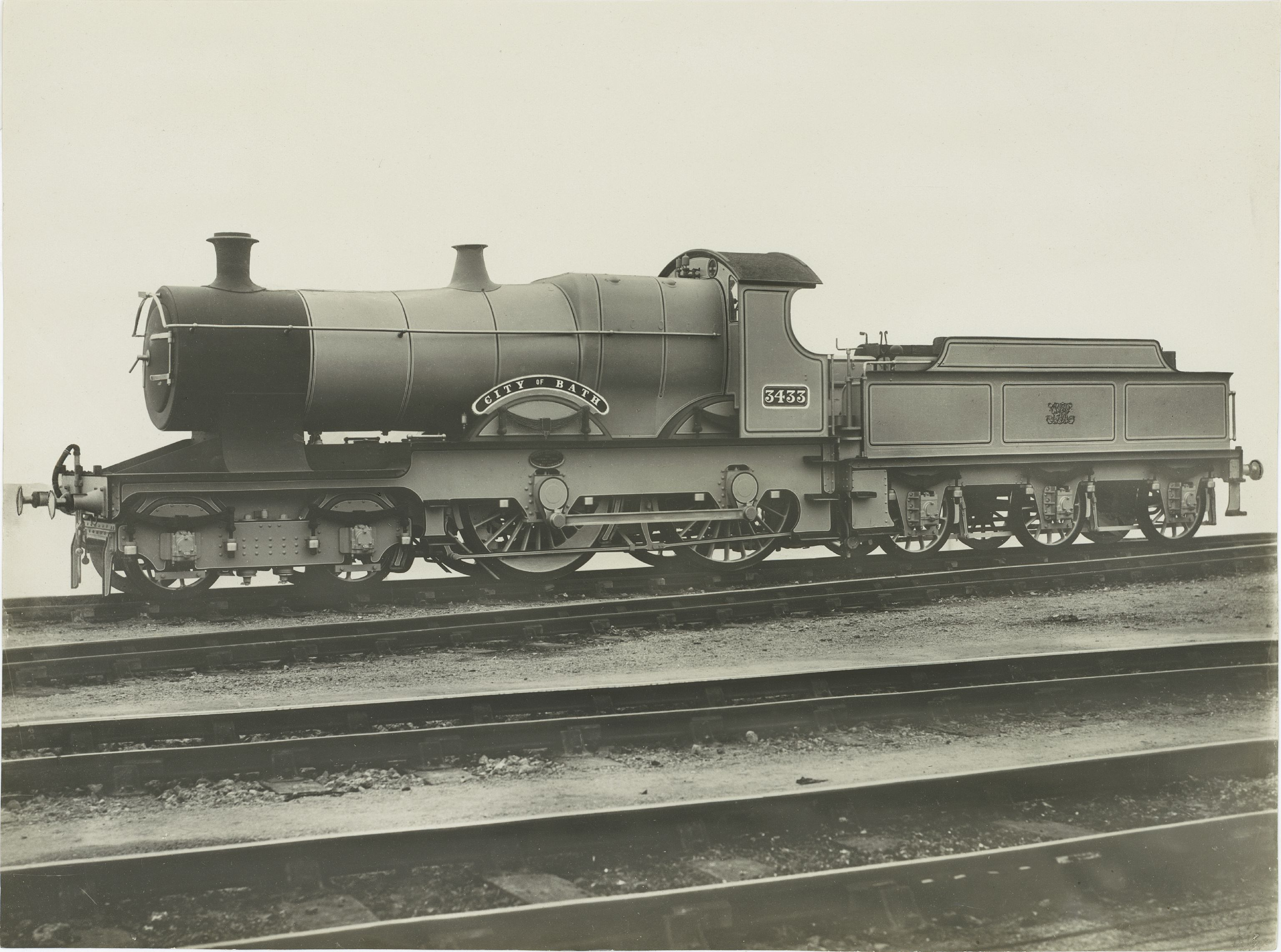
- 3433 City of Bath in 1909
Type and origin
- Power type: Steam
- Designer: George Jackson Churchward
- Builder: GWR Swindon Works
- Order number: Lot 141
- Serial number: 1993–2002
- Build date: 1903
- Total produced: 10 new + 10 rebuilt from Atbara class
- Rebuilder: Swindon Works
- Rebuild date: 1902–1909
Specifications
- Configuration
  - Whyte: 4-4-0
  - UIC: 2′B n2, later 2′B h2
- Gauge: 4 ft 8 1/2 in (1,435 mm)
- Leading dia.: 3 ft 2 in (0.97 m)
- Driver dia.: 6 ft 8 1/2 in (2.04 m)
- Wheelbase
  - Engine: 22 ft 6 in (6.86 m)
  - Leading: 6 ft 6 in (1.98 m)
  - Coupled: 8 ft 6 in (2.59 m)
- Loco weight: 55 long tons 6 cwt (123,900 lb or 56.2 t)
- Total weight: 92 long tons 1 cwt (206,200 lb or 93.5 t)
- Fuel type: Coal
- Fuel capacity: 5 long tons (5.1 t; 5.6 short tons)
- Water cap.: 3,600 imp gal (16,000 L; 4,300 US gal)
- Boiler: GWR Standard No. 4
- Cylinders: Two, inside
- Cylinder size: 18 in × 26 in (457 mm × 660 mm)
- Valve gear: Stephenson valve gear
- Valve type: Slide valves
- Loco brake: Steam
- Train brakes: Vacuum
Performance figures
- Maximum speed: 100 mph (160 km/h)
- Tractive effort: 17,800 lbf (79.2 kN)
Career
- Operators: GWR
- Class: 3700
- Power class: GWR: A
- Number in class: 20
- Numbers: (until 1912) 3400–3409, 3433–3442; (from 1912) 3700–3719
- Official name: City Class
- Axle load class: GWR: Blue
- Withdrawn: October 1927 - May 1931
- Disposition: One preserved, remainder scrapped

The Great Western Railway 3700 Class, or City Class, was a series of twenty 4-4-0 steam locomotives built for fast express passenger trains.

== Construction ==
In September 1902 a member of the Atbara Class, no. 3405 Mauritius, was reboilered with a tapered domeless boiler and Belpaire firebox. The locomotive was the first GWR 4-4-0 to be fitted with a tapered boiler; the boiler became the prototype for Churchward's Standard No. 4 boiler. In March 1903 the first of the City Class, no. 3433 City of Bath, was completed. It was fitted with the final form of the Standard No.4 boiler, with slightly curved sides and a tapered top to the firebox. Another nine locomotives were completed in May 1903. Between February 1907 and December 1908, nine Atbaras were rebuilt with this boiler and incorporated into the City Class. All members of the class were withdrawn between October 1927 and May 1931.

== Details of locomotive numbers and names ==
This class were subject to the 1912 renumbering of GWR 4-4-0 locomotives, which saw the Bulldog class gathered together in the series 3300–3455, and other types renumbered out of that series. The City Class took numbers 3700–3719, previously used by Bulldog locomotives.

Locomotives rebuilt from Atbara Class
First No	Second (1912) No	Name	Built	Rebuilt	Withdrawn	Notes
3400	3700	Durban	Aug 1901	Apr 1907	Nov 1929	
3401	3701	Gibraltar	Aug 1901	Feb 1907	Aug 1928	
3402	3702	Halifax	Aug 1901	Dec 1908	Apr 1929	
3403	3703	Hobart	Sep 1901	Feb 1909	Aug 1929	
3404	3704	Lyttleton	Sep 1901	Oct 1907	Sep 1928	Renamed Lyttelton in June 1920
3405	3705	Mauritius	Sep 1901	Sep 1902	Sep 1928	
3406	3706	Melbourne	Sep 1901	Jan 1908	Jun 1929	
3407	3707	Malta	Sep 1901	Nov 1908	Apr 1929	
3408	3708	Ophir	Oct 1901	May 1907	Oct 1929	Renamed Killarney in September 1907
3409	3709	Quebec	Oct 1901	Nov 1907	Sep 1929	

Locomotives built new as City Class (Note: All built on Lot 141, serial numbers 1993 to 2002)
First No	Second (1912) No	Name	Built	Withdrawn	Notes
3433	3710	City of Bath	Mar 1903	Sep 1928	
3434	3711	City of Birmingham	May 1903	Jul 1930	
3435	3712	City of Bristol	May 1903	May 1931	Last to be withdrawn
3436	3713	City of Chester	May 1903	Dec 1929	
3437	3714	City of Gloucester	May 1903	Nov 1929	
3438	3715	City of Hereford	May 1903	Oct 1929	
3439	3716	City of London	May 1903	Apr 1929	
3440	3717	City of Truro	May 1903	Mar 1931	Preserved
3441	3718	City of Winchester	May 1903	Oct 1927	First to be withdrawn
3442	3719	City of Worcester	May 1903	Apr 1929	Renamed City of Exeter

== Modifications ==
Superheating of the boiler was first applied to no. 3702, Halifax in June 1910. All of the class had been fitted with superheaters by 1912. Boiler feed was originally by clack valves fitted to the underside of the barrel. Top feed was introduced in 1912 and new cast iron chimneys in 1921. The slide valves were replaced by 8 in (20.3 cm) semi-plug piston valves from 1914. All the engines were fitted with steam reversing gear but only a few, including no. 3716 City of London, had the gear replaced by the screw reverse. The Dean suspension bogie was replaced by a bogie developed from the type used on the de Glehn Atlantics. Four retained the Dean bogies until withdrawal.

== Accidents and incidents ==
- On 8 August 1913, locomotive No. 3710 City of Bath overran signals and was in a rear-end collision with a passenger train at Yeovil Pen Mill station, Somerset. Two people were killed.

== City of Truro ==
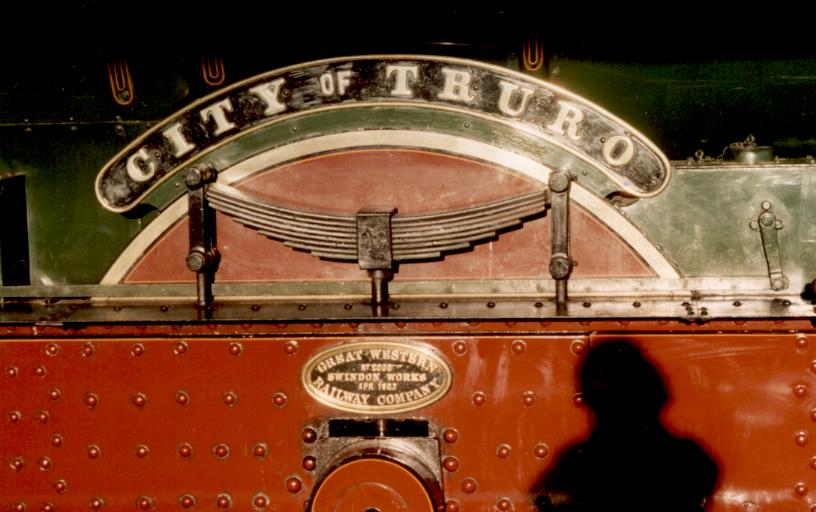
"City of Truro" nameplate and worksplate recording the loco was the 2000th to be built at Swindon in April 1903. Plymouth North Road December 2004

The most famous locomotive in the class, 3440 City of Truro (later renumbered 3717), is reputedly the first steam locomotive to travel in excess of 100 mph, on 9 May 1904. (Note: A US record was twice claimed, although not officially timed, for the inaugural run of the Empire State Express in 1893. A speed of 102 mph, then 112 on the next day, timed as 35 and 32 seconds across a mile, was claimed.) It was the 2000th locomotive to be built at Swindon, leaving the works in April 1903.

== Withdrawal ==
Withdrawal of the class began in October 1927 with 3718 City of Winchester, with a service life of just over 24 years. Regular withdrawal began in August next year and by July 1930 only two were left in service, Nos. 3712 City of Bristol and 3717 City of Truro. 3717 was the penultimate engine withdrawn in March 1931 and 3712 followed two months later in May, the former being preserved.

Table of withdrawals
Year	Quantity in service at start of year	Number withdrawn	Quantity withdrawn	Locomotive numbers
1927	20	1	1	3718
1928	19	4	5	3701/04/05/10
1929	15	12	17	3700/02–03/06–09/13–16/19
1930	3	1	18	3711
1931	2	2	20	3712/17

== Preservation ==
Because of its famed 1904 run, City of Truro was a prime candidate for preservation while the rest of the class was scrapped. It is owned by the National Railway Museum, York. It was last restored to full working order in 2004 and, as of 2009, was frequently loaned for operation on UK main lines and heritage railways. As of 2021, City of Truro is on static display.

== Models ==
Bachmann Branchline manufacture a model of City of Truro in OO gauge for sale through the National Railway Museum. In December 2014 Bachmann Branchline launched a commemorative World War I Ambulance Train pack. The train pack contains a model of 3711 City of Birmingham in World War I khaki livery, three Midland coaches in crimson lake and six World War I figures.

In the early 1960s there was a Kitmaster OO scale (1:76) plastic construction kit to build a model of 3440 City of Truro, which was later produced by Airfix and now DAPOL.

== Bibliography ==
- Allcock, N. J.; Davies, F. K.; le Fleming, H. M.; Maskelyne, J. N.; Reed, P. J. T.; Tabor, F. J. (1968) [1951]. White, D. E. (ed.). The Locomotives of the Great Western Railway, part one: Preliminary Survey. Kenilworth: RCTS.
- Casserley, H.C. (1966). Locomotives at the Grouping - No. 4 - Great Western Railway. Ian Allan Limited.
- Fox, Peter (1993). Preserved Locomotives of British Railways. Platform 5 Publishing Limited. ISBN 1-872524-54-0.
- le Fleming, H. M. (October 1954). White, D. E. (ed.). The Locomotives of the Great Western Railway, part seven: Dean's Larger Tender Engines. RCTS. ISBN 0-901115-18-5. OCLC 655235293.
- Nock, O.S. (1977). Standard Gauge Great Western 4-4-0s Part 1 Inside Cylinder Classes 1894-1910. Newton Abbot: David & Charles. ISBN 0-7153-7411-7.
- Nock, O.S. (1978). Standard Gauge Great Western 4-4-0s Part 2 Counties to the Close 1904-1961. Newton Abbot: David & Charles. ISBN 0-7153-7684-5.
