= GWR 4100 Class =

Class of 84 British 4-4-0 locomotives

GWR 4100 class
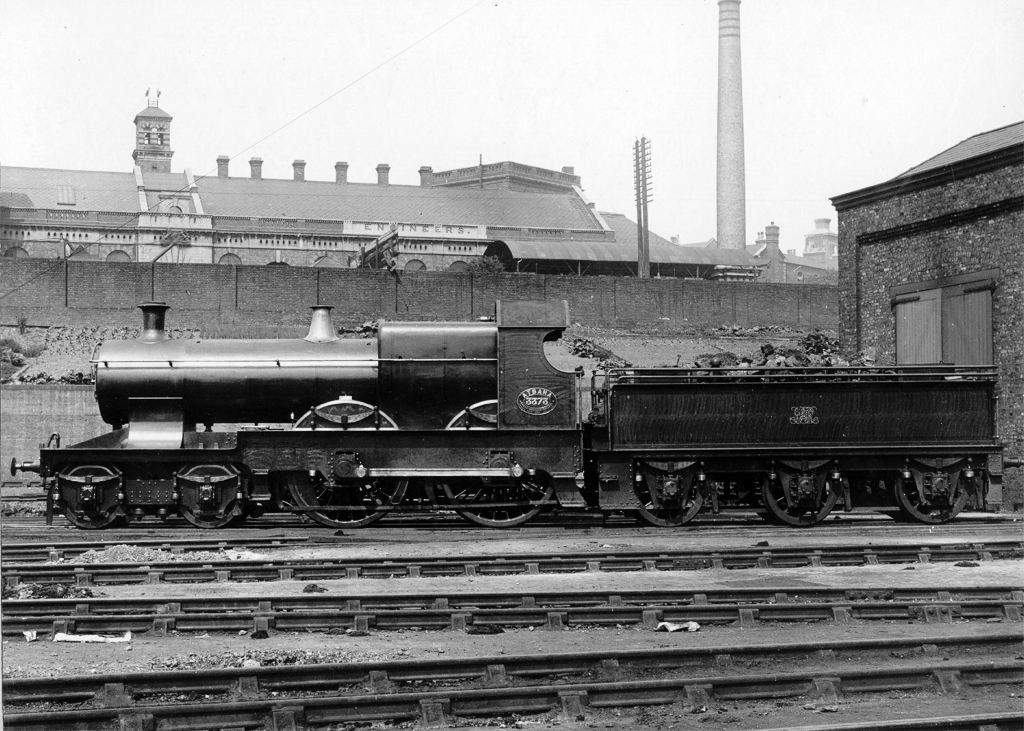
- 3373 Atbara c. 1900–1902
Type and origin
- Power type: Steam
- Designer: William Dean
- Builder: GWR Swindon Works
- Order number: Lots 109, 125, 126, 176
- Serial number: 1592–1611, 1826–1865, 2330–2349
- Build date: 1897–1908
- Total produced: 80
Specifications
- Configuration
  - Whyte: 4-4-0
  - UIC: 2′B n2
- Gauge: 4 ft 8 1/2 in (1,435 mm)
- Cylinders: Two
Career
- Operators: Great Western Railway
- Numbers: New: 3291–3311, 3373–3412, 4101–4120; from 1912: 4100–4172
- Withdrawn: 1927-1931
- Disposition: All scrapped

The GWR 4100 Class was a class of steam locomotives in the Great Western Railway (GWR) of the United Kingdom.

The Badminton class express passenger 4-4-0 steam locomotives were introduced in 1897 as a development from the earlier Duke class. The name Badminton was chosen after the Duke of Beaufort's Badminton estate, through which the GWR was building a new line to South Wales at the time.

Further modifications to the design resulted in the Atbara Class entering service in 1900, the names for these locomotives generally being taken from contemporary military engagements or senior army commanders. Later engines were named after cities of the British Empire.

The final batch of locomotives were named after varieties of garden plant and in consequence were known as the Flower Class.

These three types were later standardised and treated as a single class, so are listed together here. Four other prototype 4-4-0s, originally built in 1894 as the Armstrong Class, were also later rebuilt as Badmintons (see below).

This class were subject to the 1912 renumbering of GWR 4-4-0 locomotives, which saw the Bulldog Class gathered together in the series 3300–3455, and other types renumbered out of that series. This class took numbers 4100–4172 (of which numbers 4101–4120 had previously been used by Flower Class locomotives).

== Badminton class ==
The first member of the class, No. 3292, was completed in December 1897 with a domed parallel boiler, a raised Belpaire firebox and an extended, built-up smokebox similar to that used on the Duke Class. The outside frames were curved over each driving wheel axle. It was named Badminton in April 1898. A batch of eleven locomotives, Nos. 3293 to 3303, were completed between April and July 1898, with a further batch of eight, Nos. 3304 to 3311, between September 1898 and January 1899. The class were the first locomotives on the GWR to be fitted with copper Belpaire fireboxes. The penultimate example, No. 3310 Waterford, was fitted with a domeless parallel boiler, a steel Belpaire firebox, and an enlarged cab.

The class were fitted with a steam chest and slide valves located beneath the cylinders. The valves were driven by Stephenson valve gear. This inverted arrangement of slide valves and steam chest, originally introduced by William Stroudley of the LB&SCR, allowed the valves to drop away from the cylinder's steam port faces when the regulator was closed, thus reducing wear. Because the steam chest was below the cylinders, and not between them, the latter could have an increased diameter. The centre line of the cylinders was inclined at an angle of 6° to the centre line of the valves, each centre line being aligned with the driving centre. This arrangement allowed the valve rods to be driven directly from the expansion link. First used on the Armstrong and 3031 Classes, this arrangement of cylinders, valves and valve gear was subsequently used on all GWR outside framed 4-4-0s, with the slide valves being eventually replaced by piston valves.

The crankpins for the coupling rods were placed in line with the corresponding inside crankpins for the connecting rods. This arrangement was also developed by Stroudley, who claimed that the motion of the inside cranks was smoothly transferred to the coupling rods, as happens in an outside-cylindered engine, where the connecting rod acts directly on a crankpin shared with the coupling rod. According to Stroudley, the axleboxes, bearing surfaces, hornblocks and coupling rods of locomotives with outside cylinders had a service life twice as long as those on inside-cylindered examples. However, by aligning the two cranks together, heavy balancing weights were required on the driving wheels, at 180° to the outside crank, to counteract the combined mass of the cranks and rods. The Badmintons had massive crescent-shaped balancing weights, which made the unmounted pairs of wheels difficult to handle in the workshop.

Numbers		Names	
First	Second (1912)	First	Second
3292	4100	Badminton	
3293	4101	Barrington	
3294	4102	Blenheim	
3295	4103	Bessborough	
3296	4104	Cambria	
3297	4105	Earl Cawdor	
3298	4106	Grosvenor	
3299	4107	Hubbard	Alexander Hubbard
3300	4108	Hotspur	
3301	4109	Monarch	
3302	4110	Mortimer	Charles Mortimer
3303	4111	Marlborough	
3304	4112	Oxford	Name removed in 1927
3305	4113	Samson	
3306	4114	Shelburne	
3307	4115	Shrewsbury	Name removed in 1927
3308	4116	Savernake	
3309	4117	Shakespeare	
3310	4118	Waterford	
3311	4119	Wynnstay	

One locomotive of the Badminton Class was rebuilt with an experimental boiler. With the impending opening of the direct Reading–Taunton line which was of more undulating nature than the route via Bristol, there was a need to ensure that the most appropriate locomotives were provided. Churchward's Chief Assistant, F.G. Wright, designed a large boiler with a very deep firebox, which was fitted to No. 3297 Earl Cawdor in July 1903. The boiler was designed to hold a large volume of hot water, forming a reservoir to assist the locomotive running along an undulating line. It also provided a steam space of 85.13 cu ft (2.411 m^{3}) compared to the 76.2 cu ft (2.16 m^{3}) of the Standard No. 4 boiler, the larger of the two standard boiler models fitted to the 4-4-0s. This increase in volume was intended to provide a reservoir of steam. The firebox was set deep between the coupled axles, with a horizontal grate. The intent was to allow a thick fire to be built up, increasing the area of the firebox in contact with the fire, and decreasing the temperature gradient along the firebox plates, thus reducing the risk of broken firebox stays. The boiler was pressed to 210 lbf/in^{2} (1.4 MPa). No. 3297 was also fitted with a large cab with two side windows, reminiscent of North Eastern practice. The locomotive was regularly rostered on the most demanding trains, but it soon became apparent that it was not up to the work demanded and it was relegated to secondary duties. In October 1906 the boiler was removed and replaced by a Standard No. 4 boiler, the North Eastern style side-window cab having been replaced by a Churchward type in November 1904.

== Atbara class ==
No. 3373 Atbara was built in April 1900, the first of a class of forty locomotives. Instead of the curved outside frames of the Badmintons, this class had straight-topped frames, which became the standard pattern for all subsequent outside-framed 4-4-0s. These straight frames were less prone to fracturing, because of the greater depth of plate between the coupled wheels. The Atbaras retained the Stroudley crank layout, cylinders, valves and valve gear of the Badmintons, but differed in the boiler, which was a parallel domeless Standard No. 2 type. No. 3405 Mauritius was reboilered in September 1902 with a tapered boiler, a prototype for the Standard No. 4 type. It was the first GWR 4-4-0 to be fitted with a tapered (or coned) boiler. Following this, another nine Atbaras, nos. 3400 to 3404 and 3406 to 3409, were rebuilt with No. 4 boilers between February 1907 and February 1909. The ten were added to the City Class. No. 3382 Mafeking was heavily damaged in an accident that occurred just after midnight on 25 June 1911 at Henley-in-Arden. Adjudged unrepairable, it was withdrawn in September 1911, so was not included in the 1912 renumbering. The remaining Atbaras were withdrawn between April 1927 and May 1931.

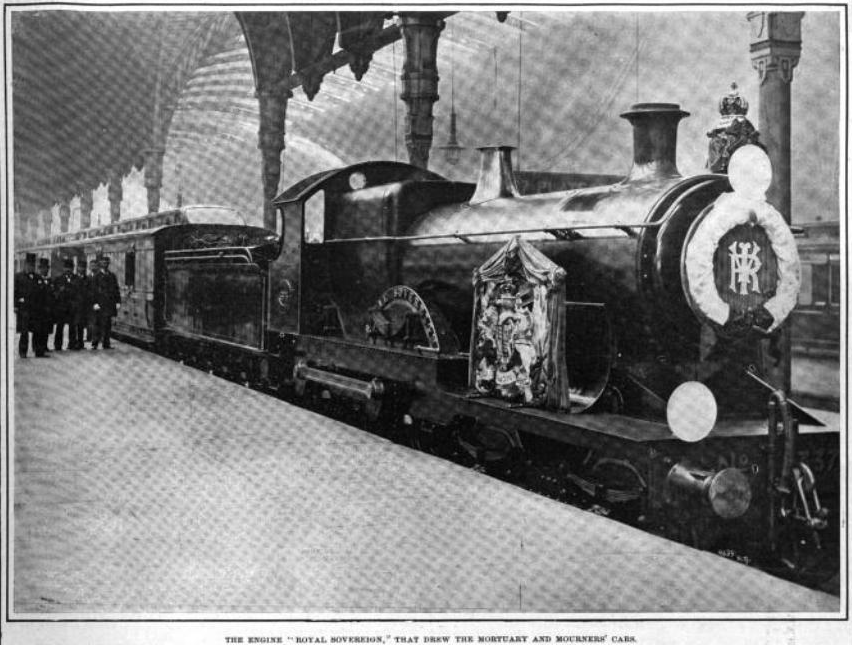
Atbara Class locomotive no. 3373, in Royal Sovereign livery, on February 2, 1901.

Numbers		Names		
First	Second (1912)	First	Second	Third
3373	4120	Atbara		
3374	4121	Baden Powell		
3375	4122	Conqueror	Edgcumbe	Colonel Edgcumbe
3376	4123	Herschell	Name removed in 1914	
3377	4124	Kitchener		
3378	4125	Khartoum		
3379	4126	Kimberley		
3380	4127	Ladysmith		
3381	4128	Maine		
3382	Withdrawn	Mafeking		
3383	4129	Kekewich		
3384	4130	Omdurman		
3385	4131	Powerful		
3386	4132	Pembroke	Name removed in 1930	
3387	4133	Roberts		
3388	4134	Sir Redvers		
3389	4135	Sir Daniel	Pretoria	
3390	4136	Terrible		
3391	4137	Wolseley		
3392	4138	White		
3393	4139	Auckland		
3394	4140	Adelaide	Name removed in 1910	
3395	4141	Aden		
3396	4142	Brisbane		
3397	4143	Cape Town		
3398	4144	Colombo		
3399	4145	Dunedin		
3400	City 3700	Durban		
3401	City 3701	Gibraltar		
3402	City 3702	Halifax		
3403	City 3703	Hobart		
3404	City 3704	Lyttelton		
3405	City 3705	Mauritius		
3406	City 3706	Melbourne		
3407	City 3707	Malta		
3408	City 3708	Killarney		
3409	City 3709	Quebec		
3410	4146	Sydney		
3411	4147	St. Johns		
3412	4148	Singapore		

== Flower class ==
The Flower Class were fitted with deeper outside frames than the Atbaras, and a new design of bogie developed from the type fitted to the French de Glehn Atlantics. Twenty of the class were built between May and July 1908. Three were withdrawn in July 1927, with the last withdrawal, no. 4150 Begonia, going in April 1931.

Numbers		Name
First	Second (1912)	Name
4101	4149	Auricula
4102	4150	Begonia
4103	4151	Calceolaria
4104	4152	Calendula
4105	4153	Camellia
4106	4154	Campanula
4107	4155	Cineraria
4108	4156	Gardenia
4109	4157	Lobelia
4110	4158	Petunia
4111	4159	Anemone
4112	4160	Carnation
4113	4161	Hyacinth
4114	4162	Marguerite
4115	4163	Marigold
4116	4164	Mignonette
4117	4165	Narcissus
4118	4166	Polyanthus
4119	4167	Primrose
4120	4168	Stephanotis

== Prototype 4-4-0 locomotives ==
The Armstrong Class were a group of four locomotives designed by William Dean and built in 1894 with 7 ft 1.5 in (2.172 m) driving wheels. In April 1915 no. 16 Brunel was rebuilt with 6 ft 8.5 in (2.045 m) wheels and piston valves, having already been fitted with a Standard No.2 boiler. It was renumbered 4169 as a member of the Flower Class. No. 14 Charles Saunders was converted in May 1917, and the remaining two were dealt with in February 1923.

Numbers		Date Renumbered	Names		Date Withdrawn
First	Second	Date Renumbered	First	Second	Date Withdrawn
16	4169	April 1915	Brunel		July 1930
14	4170	May 1917	Charles Saunders		August 1928
7	4171	February 1923	Charles Saunders	Armstrong	September 1928
8	4172	February 1923	Gooch		April 1929

== Bibliography ==
- Davies, Ken (April 1993). The Locomotives of the Great Western Railway, part fourteen: Names and their Origins - Railmotor Services - War Service - The Complete Preservation Story. Lincoln: RCTS. ISBN 0-901115-75-4.
- le Fleming, H. M. (October 1954). White, D. E. (ed.). The Locomotives of the Great Western Railway, part seven: Dean's Larger Tender Engines. RCTS. ISBN 0-901115-18-5. OCLC 655235293.
- Holcroft, Harold (1971). An Outline Of Great Western Locomotive Practice 1837-1947. Shepperton, Middlesex: Ian Allan. ISBN 0-7110-0228-2.
- Nock, O.S. (1977). Standard Gauge Great Western 4-4-0s Part 1 Inside Cylinder Classes 1894-1910. Newton Abbot: David & Charles. ISBN 0-7153-7411-7.
- Nock, O.S. (1978). Standard Gauge Great Western 4-4-0s Part 2 Counties to the Close 1904-1961. Newton Abbot: David & Charles. ISBN 0-7153-7684-5.
- GWR Engines Names, Numbers Types & Classes. Originally published by the Great Western Railway and Great Western Railway Magazine 1911 and 1928. Reprinted: David & Charles, Newton Abbot, Devon. 1971. ISBN 0-7153-5367-5
