= Williton railway station =

Heritage railway station in Somerset, England

Williton
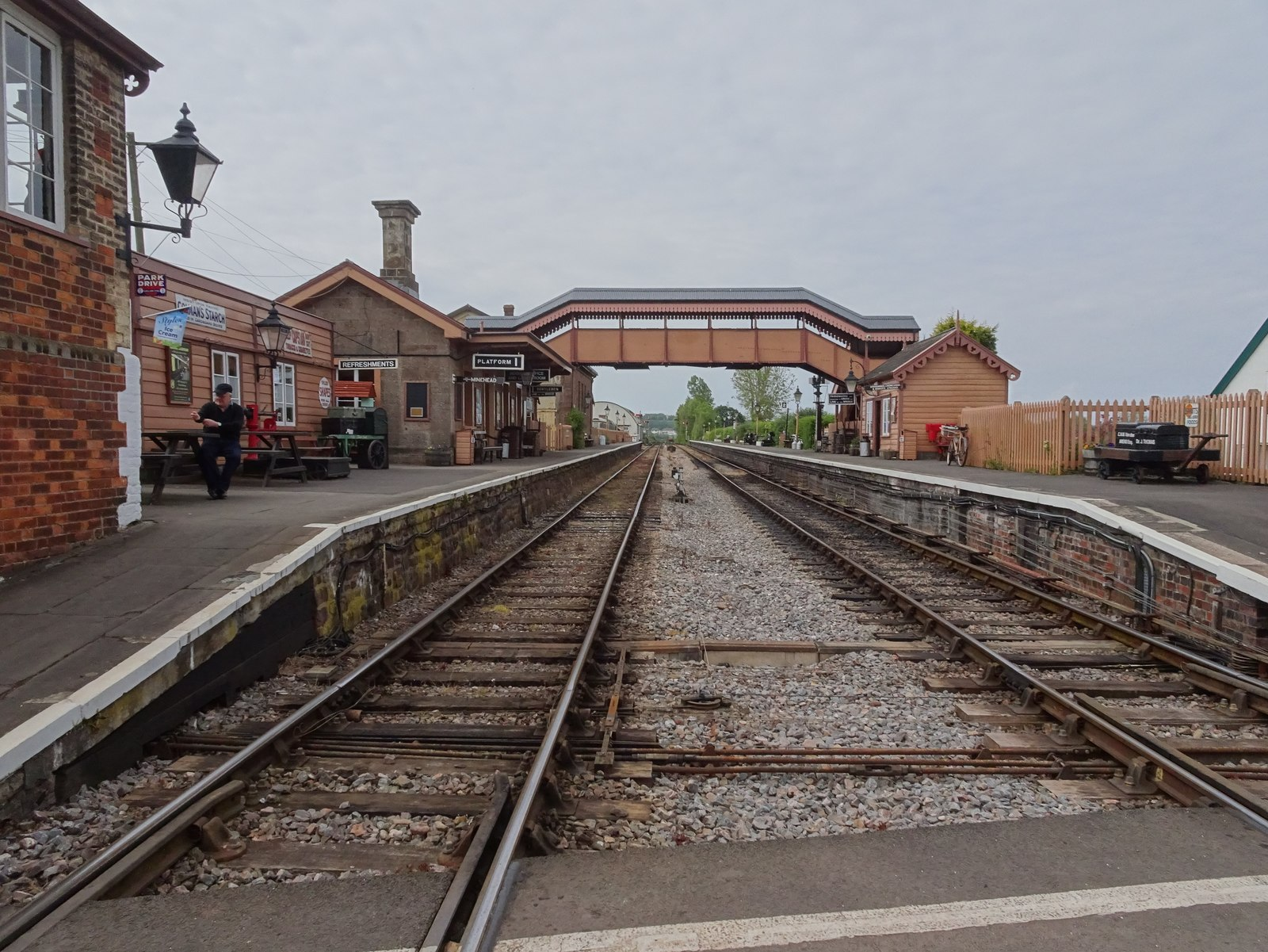

General information
- Location: Williton, Somerset; England
- Coordinates: 51.1667°N 3.3092°W
- Grid reference: ST085415
- System: Station on heritage railway
- Operator: West Somerset Railway
- Platforms: 2

History
- Original company: West Somerset Railway
- Post-grouping: Great Western Railway

Key dates
- 1862: Opened
- 1971: Closed
- 1976: Opened in preservation
Location

Williton railway station in Williton, Somerset, England, was opened by the West Somerset Railway in 1862 and closed by British Rail in 1971. It was reopened in 1976 as a heritage line. The locomotive workshops here are the headquarters of the Diesel and Electric Preservation Group (DEPG).

== History ==
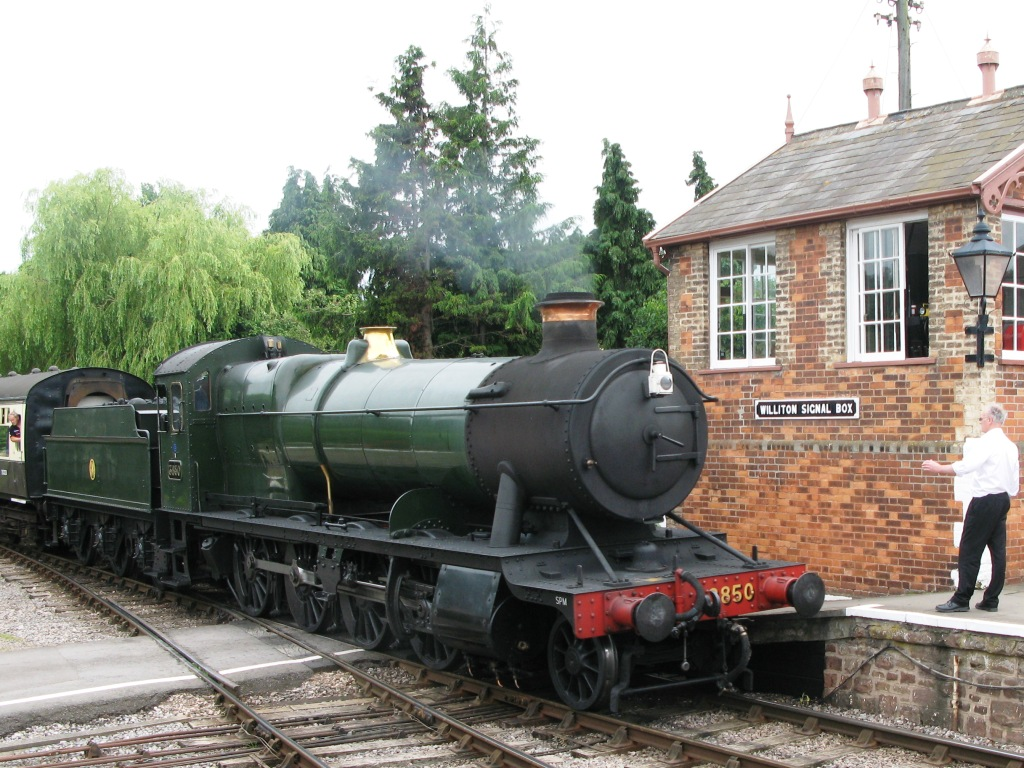
A train from Bishops Lydeard exchanges tokens by the signal box which was built in 1874 and is still in use

The station opened on 31 March 1862 when the West Somerset Railway started operations between Norton Junction and Watchet. A virtual copy of Bishops Lydeard, it consisted of a single platform on the down-side (left) of trains travelling towards Watchet. With the extension of the West Somerset Railway from Watchet to Minehead, a loop became necessary at a mid-way point on the line. Hence in 1874 a second broad gauge track and associated platform was opened, allowing trains to pass within the station. To enable this, a new road bridge was built at the south end of the station before the loop was opened, but the level crossing next to the platform was left in place.

The railway was operated from its opening by the Bristol and Exeter Railway, which became a part of the Great Western Railway in 1876. The West Somerset Railway remained an independent company until 1922, when it too was absorbed by the Great Western. In 1907, and again in 1937, the passing loop was extended to allow longer summer through-trains on their way to Minehead to pass at Williton. In 1948, the line became a part of the Western Region of British Railways as a result of nationalisation in 1948, after which in the 1960s the loop line was shortened back towards the original level crossing point.

The station closed on 4 January 1971. On 28 August 1976, a new West Somerset Railway reopened the station. It was the terminus of the line from Minehead until 7 May 1978 when the line was extended to Stogumber. The goods shed and yard have since been adapted for restoring and repairing locomotives and carriages.

== Description ==
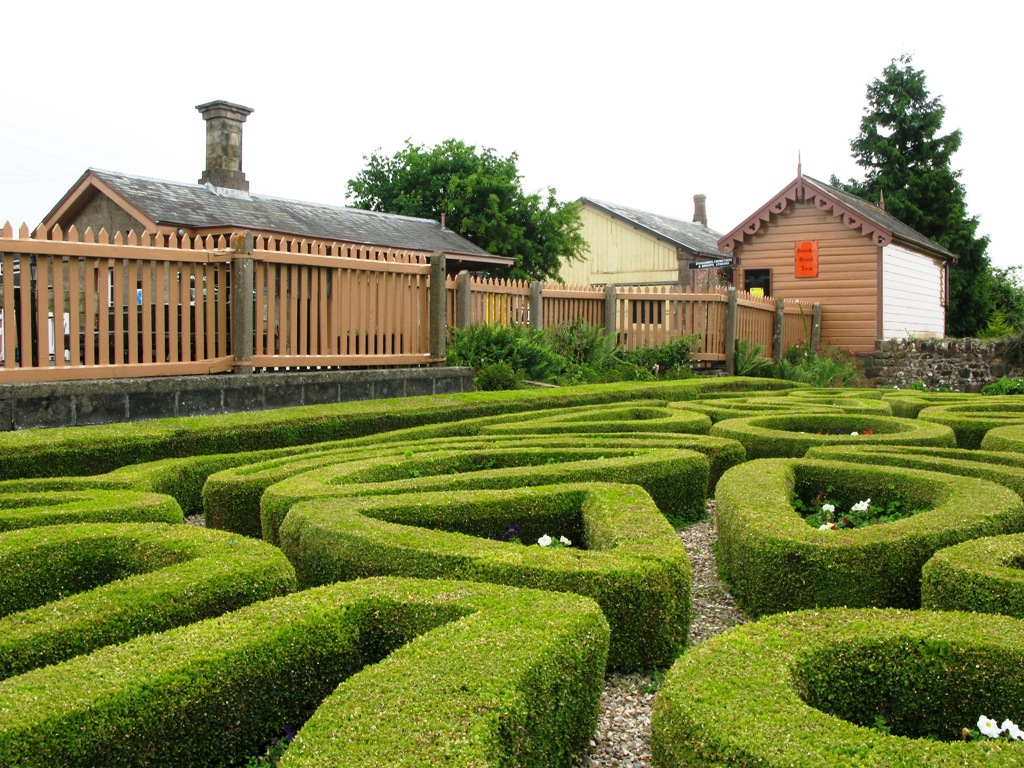
The topiary box hedge garden, which is over 100 years old

The main station building is on the northbound platform, being typical of a Bristol and Exeter Railway stations of the 1860s complete with an Italianate chimney, and next door is a matching small cafe. To the south is the signal box which dates from 1875, the only Bristol and Exeter Railway one still in use, it still operates the signals and overlooks the level crossing at the south end of the station. Beyond this is a small store which dates from 1862, and the road bridge. On the north side of the station building is the goods shed, now used as a diesel heritage visitor centre, and the locomotive workshops.

The opposite platform was built in 1874 (the original broad gauge loading gauge still reflected in the platform's spacing), and has always been the site of a wooden waiting room. Behind this platform is a box hedge garden which is over 100 years old. The original B&ER footbridge was installed towards the south end of the station close to the signal box, but was removed by British Railways in the 1960s, when they shortened the passing loop. A new original GWR footbridge that had previously been in use at Trowbridge railway station, was brought into use on the north side of the main station building on 16 July 2011, so that people can cross to the second platform without having to cross the tracks on the level crossing.

The newspaper kiosk, plate layers hut, signal box, waiting room and east platform and booking office are listed buildings.

== Railway workshops ==
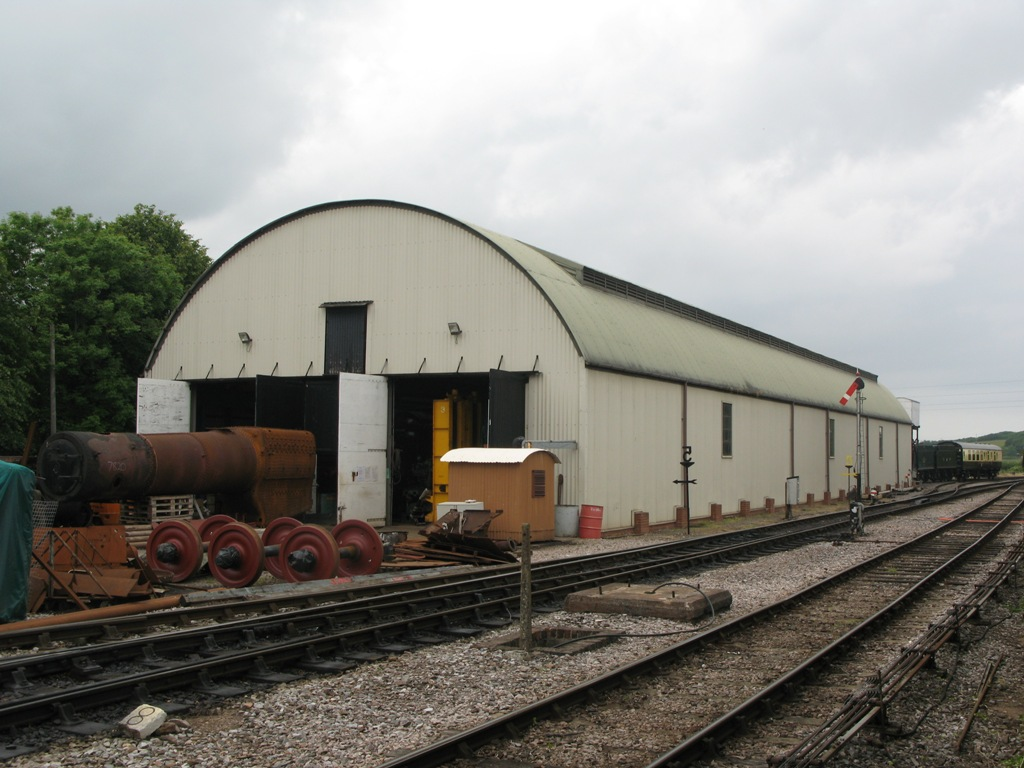
The workshop moved from Swindon

The station is a major site for the WSR's workshops. The former goods shed was converted for use by the DEPG as a locomotive workshop; this has since been supplemented by a purpose-built workshop nearby. At the far end of the station yard is a pre-fabricated building that is used for steam locomotive and coach overhauls by the West Somerset Railway Association, the volunteer supporters of the West Somerset Railway; it was originally erected at Swindon Works in 1899 and is Grade II listed and was donated by Tarmac Ltd following the closure of the works.

== Services ==
Trains run between Minehead and Bishops Lydeard at weekends and on some other days from March to October, daily during the late spring and summer, and on certain days during the winter.

Preceding station	Heritage railways	Following station
Doniford Halt towards Minehead	West Somerset Railway	Stogumber towards Bishops Lydeard
