= Doniford =

Hamlet in Somerset, England

Coordinates: 51.1779°N 3.3055°W

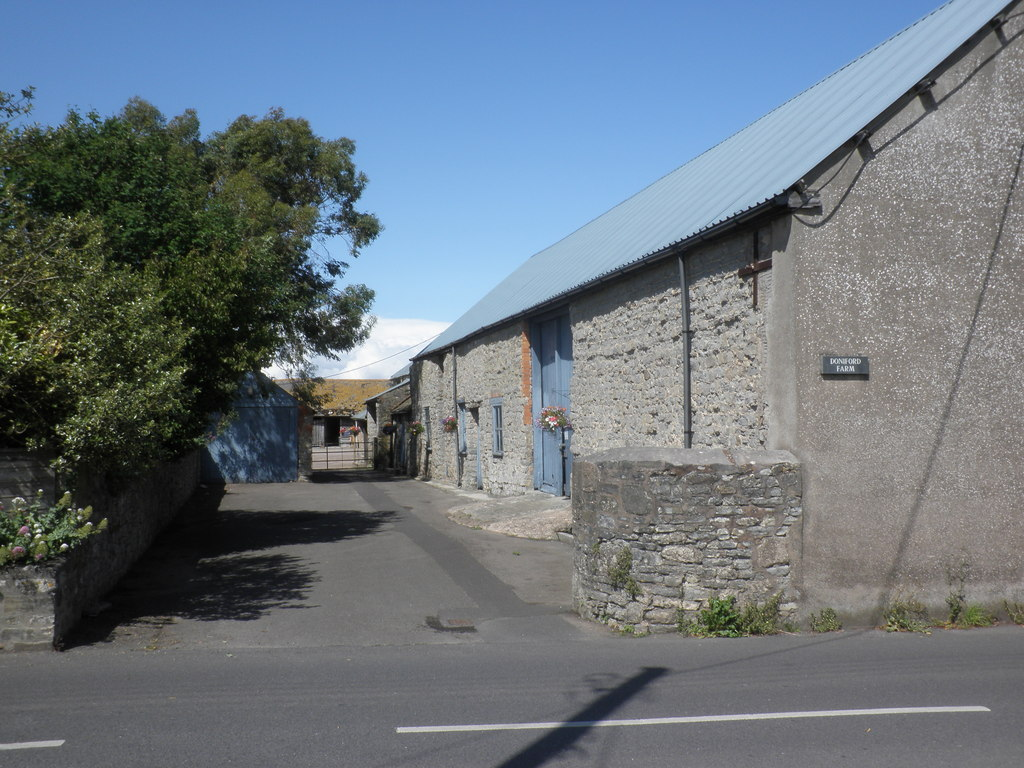
- Doniford Farm

- Location within Somerset
- OS grid reference: ST085435
- Civil parish: Williton
- Unitary authority: Somerset
- Ceremonial county: Somerset
- Region: South West
- Country: England
- Sovereign state: United Kingdom
- Post town: WATCHET
- Postcode district: TA23
- Dialling code: 01984
- Police: Avon and Somerset
- Fire: Devon and Somerset
- Ambulance: South Western
- UK Parliament: Bridgwater

Doniford is a hamlet in the civil parish of Williton, in Somerset, England. It is located along the Helwell Bay between Watchet and Williton.

Doniford House has late medieval origins and was enlarged circa 1600.

== Transport ==
The village is served by Doniford Halt on the heritage West Somerset Railway. Bus services stop at Doniford Farm Park.

== Beach ==
Doniford Beach is a fossil beach known for rock pools and the collapsing cliffs between Doniford and St Audries. Beside the beach is an early 19th-century lime kiln which is thought to have been in operation until the 1930s.
