= Norton Fitzwarren railway station =

Former railway station in England

Norton Fitzwarren
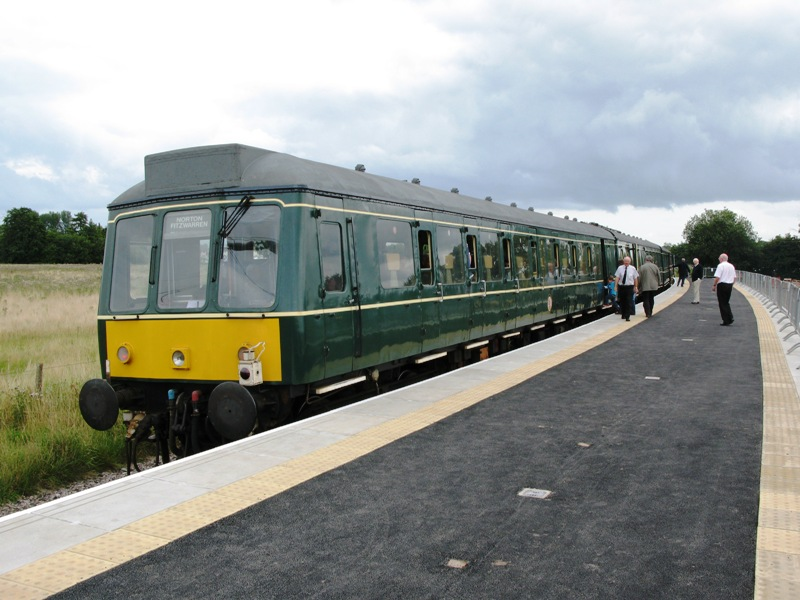

General information
- Location: Norton Fitzwarren, Somerset; England
- Coordinates: 51.0246°N 3.1571°W
- Grid reference: ST190258
- System: Station on heritage railway
- Operator: West Somerset Railway
- Platforms: 2

History
- Original company: Bristol and Exeter Railway
- Post-grouping: Great Western Railway

Key dates
- 1873: First station opened
- 1961: First station closed
- 2009: New station opened
Location

Norton Fitzwarren railway station is an untimetabled station on the West Somerset Railway in Somerset, England. It was built in 2009 about 1/4 mile (0.4 km) north of the site of the old (Norton Fitzwarren) station that served the village of Norton Fitzwarren from 1873 until 1961. There were fatal railway accidents in the vicinity in 1890, 1940 and 1978.

== History ==
=== First station ===
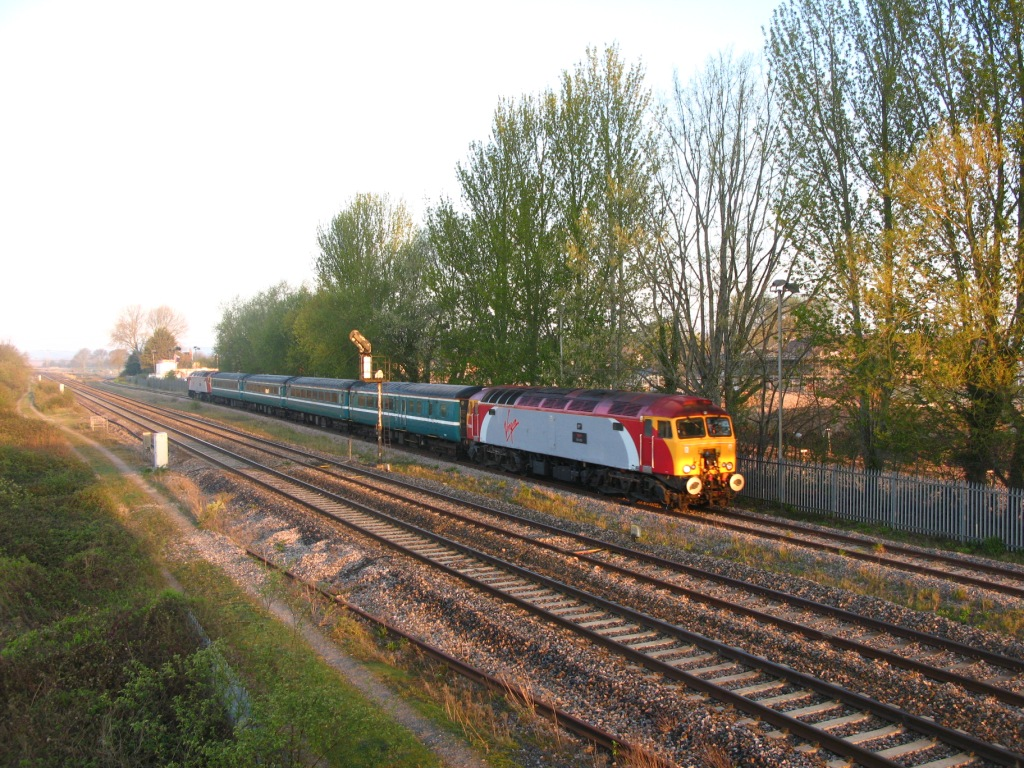
A Class 57 passes the site of the first station with an empty stock movement from Bishops Lydeard to Taunton

The Bristol and Exeter Railway (B&ER) was opened through Norton Fitzwarren on 1 May 1843 but the nearest station was 2 miles (3 km) east at Taunton. On 31 March 1862 the original West Somerset Railway was opened to Watchet, leaving the Exeter line at Norton Junction, but still no station was provided. The first section of the Devon and Somerset Railway to Wiveliscombe opened on 8 June 1871, making a connection into the West Somerset line just west of the junction with the Exeter line.

The first two-platform station was finally opened at the junction on 1 June 1873, located immediately east of the junction (at 51°01′24″N 3°08′57″W). On the northern platform side closest to the village was a small station building, a hotel and the goods yard. Both the branch lines were operated by the B&ER until 1 January 1876 when it was amalgamated with the Great Western Railway (GWR).

In 1931 the GWR started a project to quadruple the track between Cogload Junction (where the mainline from Bristol Temple Meads and the north met the Castle Cary cut-off line from Yeovil, Reading and London Paddington), for the 7 miles (11 km) south through Taunton to Norton Fitzwarren. The existing station buildings were demolished, to allow a new up-relief line to be built north of the existing northern platform, followed by the creation of a down relief road south of the southern platform. A new metal passenger bridge was erected, connecting the new station buildings to the north with both island platforms. The completion of the project also allowed the GWR to create the large regional goods facility at Fairwater Yard, located just east of the station. The whole project was brought into operation on 2 December 1931.

=== World War 2: US Army Depot G-50 ===
At the start of World War II, the Royal Army Service Corps choose the relatively large scale station serving the small community as the ideal location for a new logistics depot. Finished at the end of 1941, it was immediately taken over by the United States Army as part of Operation Bolero in early 1942, one of their 18 supplies depots within the United Kingdom. Redesignated Quartermaster General Depot G-50, they equipped it with extensive railway sidings to the northeast of the railway station.

Part of the reasoning behind the choice of the depot, was that it was one of five within the 18 designated as a US Army Medical Corps supplies depot. Medical supplies were allocated 110,680 square feet (10,283 m^{2}) of under cover storage, and a further 25,000 square feet (2,300 m^{2}) outside. The US Army also locally developed the 67th General Hospital at Musgrove Park. Both facilities under the control of the US Army Medical Corps came into operation on 1 September 1942.

=== Closure ===
On 1 January 1948 the railways were nationalised and Norton Fitzwarren became a part of the Western Region of British Railways. Passenger traffic was withdrawn on 30 October 1961, after which passengers for the two branches once again had to change trains at Taunton until these routes were closed on 3 October 1966 (the Devon and Somerset line) and 4 January 1971 (West Somerset line). The goods yard continued to operate until 6 July 1964, when the logistics facilities of Norton Manor Camp closed.

The goods facilities had always handled a large volume of locally grown cider apples, and on 1 March 1983 a private siding utilising much of the former up-relief road connection to the WSR was opened into the Taunton Cider Company's factory on the northwest side of the former station site. Although this factory has since closed, it was this private siding that allowed the West Somerset Railway, in its new heritage railway guise, to be connected to the national railway network.

Preceding station	Historical railways	Following station
Wellington	Great Western Railway; Bristol to Exeter	Taunton
Bishops Lydeard	Great Western Railway; Taunton to Minehead	Taunton
Milverton	Great Western Railway; Taunton to Barnstaple	Taunton

=== West Somerset Railway ===
In 2004 the West Somerset Railway Association (WSRA) — the volunteer organisation that supports the WSR — purchased 33 acres (13 ha) of land west of its railway and north of the main line at Norton Fitzwarren.

This included a short length of the track bed of the dismantled Barnstaple branch line. This track bed and a new north-west chord have eventually formed a triangle where rolling stock is turned when required. Part of the land is used for ballast reclamation, with waste material being delivered to the site by Network Rail in conjunction with their track renewals depot at nearby Fairwater Yard.

There is also sufficient space to allow for the construction of a locomotive and rolling stock restoration depot in the future.

The WSRA built a single concrete platform on the west side of the Minehead to Taunton line in 2009. This is not shown in the regular timetable but is for use during special events when a shuttle service can bring people from Bishops Lydeard. It is long enough to handle four-coach trains. It was first used on 1 and 2 August 2009 in association with a vintage vehicle rally on the WSR's land at Norton Fitzwarren.

There is currently no public access to the site. This might change as the adjacent 'Ford Farm' site has been identified as a Potential Mixed Use Development site in the Taunton Deane Core Strategy, and an associated transport policy statement that any such development should include improved access to the adjoining West Somerset Railway station.

The WSR entered into a partnership with the modern Great Western Railway (GWR) in 2019 to operate Summer Saturday services between Taunton and Bishops Lydeard on Saturdays when special events were taking place. On 3 August, services called additionally at Norton Fitzwarren for the annual Steam Fayre Vintage Rally, run by the WSRA, taking place at the station. These GWR services were the first time the new station was served by trains from the national rail network.

Preceding station	National Rail	Following station
Bishops Lydeard	Great Western Railway; Special services only	Taunton
Preceding station	Heritage railways	Following station
Bishops Lydeard towards Minehead	West Somerset Railway Special events only	Taunton Terminus

== Accidents ==
Three significant accidents have happened on the main line in the vicinity of Norton Fitzwarren:

- The Ocean Mails collision – 10 people were killed in a collision at Norton Fitzwarren on 11 November 1890 when a special train conveying passengers from a mail liner from the Cape of Good Hope, who had been landed at Plymouth Millbay, collided with a goods train standing on the same line which had been forgotten by the signalman.
- The wartime derailment – another crash occurred on 4 November 1940, which left 27 people dead, this time when a driver of a train leaving Taunton under blackout conditions due to the war misread signals and believed he was on a different line to the one on which he was travelling. The train was derailed at trap points as the driver mistook main line signals for his own.
- The Taunton sleeper fire – a coach in the 22:30 sleeper train from Penzance to London Paddington station caught fire on the morning of 6 July 1978 and was brought to a stand near Norton Fitzwarren. Twelve people were killed and 15 people were injured.
