= Williton =

Village and civil parish in Somerset, England

Coordinates: 51.1648°N 3.3087°W

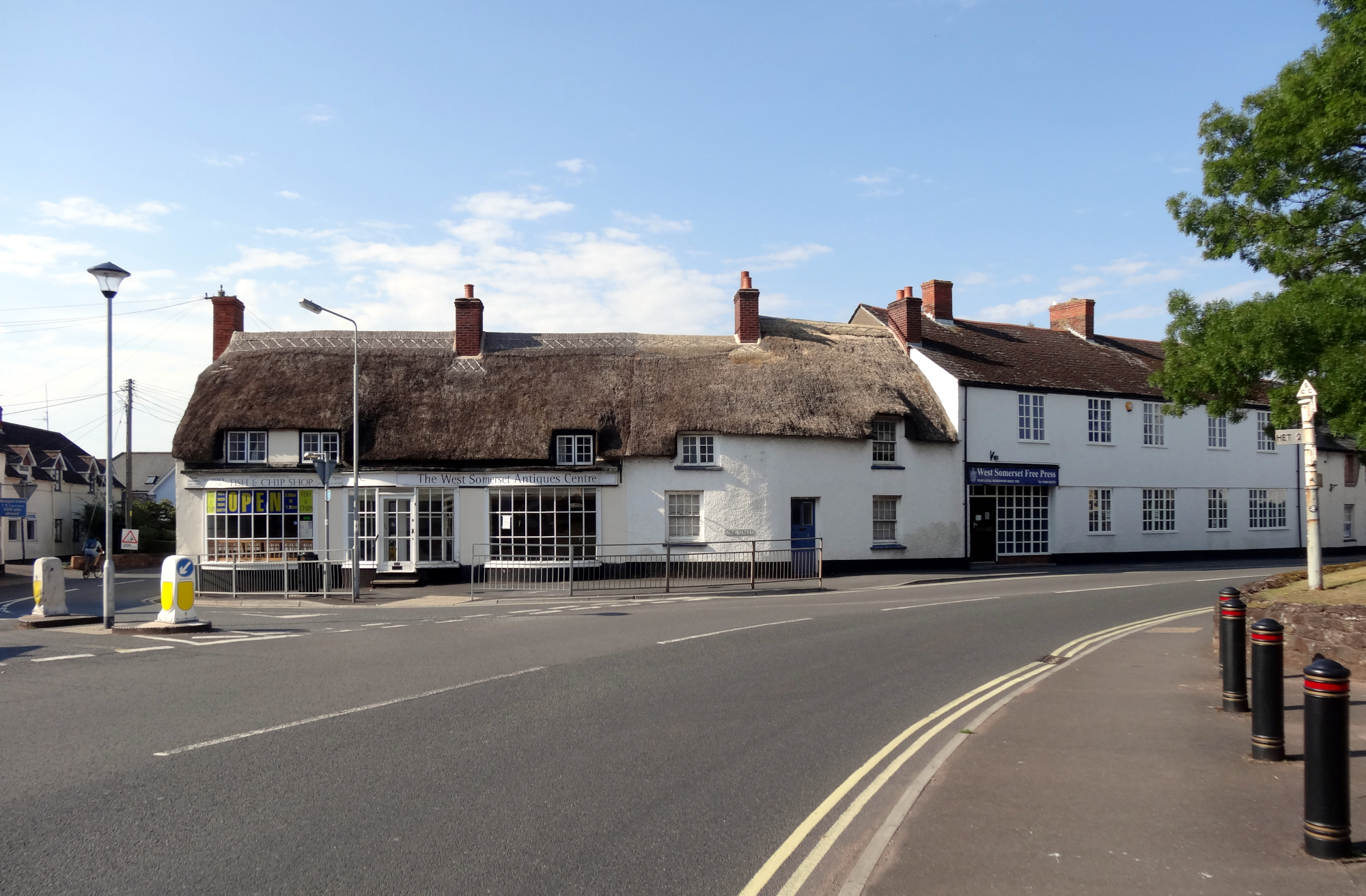
- Shops and cottages on Long Street

- Location within Somerset
- Population: 2,883 (Parish, 2021)
- OS grid reference: ST077412
- Unitary authority: Somerset
- Ceremonial county: Somerset
- Region: South West
- Country: England
- Sovereign state: United Kingdom
- Post town: TAUNTON
- Postcode district: TA4
- Dialling code: 01984
- Police: Avon and Somerset
- Fire: Devon and Somerset
- Ambulance: South Western
- UK Parliament: Tiverton and Minehead

Williton is a village and civil parish in Somerset, England. The village lies 1.5 miles (2.4 km) south of Watchet, and 14 miles (23 km) north-west of Taunton, its post town. As well as the village itself, the parish also covers surrounding rural areas, including the hamlets of Stream to the south-west and Doniford on the coast to the north-east, where there is a Haven Holidays centre. At the 2021 census, the parish had a population of 2,833.

Williton station is on the West Somerset Railway, a heritage railway. The line also has a station at Doniford Halt.

Williton is twinned with Neung-sur-Beuvron in the Loir-et-Cher département of France.

== History ==
The name of Williton is Anglo-Saxon and means "estate on the Willet" (river); the Willet is a brook that rises at Willet, flows north through the hamlet of Stream, and close to the former manor house of Williton, then it joins the Doniford Brook north-east of Williton. Both watercourses seem to have been known as the Willet in the 12th century.

"Willet" may well be a British name. In the time of Edward the Elder the manor at Wiilitun was a royal hunting estate; its only pre-Conquest mention is in Edward's charter to the priory at Taunton, in which the prior and monks are enjoined to provide board and lodging for a single night, when the king was progressing, with dogs and falcons and their keepers, "ad Curig vel Willittun", "to Curry or else Williton". In the Domesday Survey Williton continued to form a royal estate, with Carhampton and Cannington. In the Middle Ages the village was divided into the manors of Williton Fulford and Williton Hadley. An estate known as Williton Templar belonged to the Knights Templar, and was later known as Williton Hospital and Williton Regis. Originally the centre of the village appears to have been near the church but over time it has migrated to the north-east.

Williton historically formed part of the ancient parish of St Decuman's in the Williton and Freemanners hundred of Somerset. The parish was named after its parish church, to the south of Watchet. A chapel of ease dedicated to St Peter existed at Williton from medieval times; the building was largely rebuilt between 1856 and 1859. The chapelry of Williton became ecclesiastically independent from St Decuman's in 1784, when a grant from Queen Anne's Bounty allowed it to fund its own clergy. Williton remained part of the civil parish of St Decuman's until 1902, when St Decuman's was split into two civil parishes called Williton and Watchet.

Within Williton parish, to the south-west, is Orchard Wyndham House, a Grade I listed building, which was the centre of an estate called "Orchard". Paleolithic, mesolithic and neolithic flints have been found at Doniford to the north-east of Williton while three Bronze Age barrows survive at Battlegore Burial Chamber, just north of the centre of Williton.

Much of the centre of Williton dates from the later 19th century but Long Street includes several 17th-century houses, as do Bridge, Priest, Robert and Shutgate Streets. Agriculture has been the prime activity in the parish while Williton village became a local government and communal centre. Its importance increased with the creation of new toll roads that today are the main roads to the village. It is an important local shopping area and from 1894 has been an administration centre. It had a workhouse for the district, which became the local hospital until 1990 but has now been converted into housing.

Doniford House has late medieval origins and was enlarged circa 1600. Beside the beach is an early 19th-century lime kiln which is thought to have been in operation until the 1930s.

Before World War II at a site between Watchet and Doniford a gunnery range was established for various army units to practice anti-aircraft gunnery. Unmanned target aircraft were towed by planes from RAF Weston Zoyland and later were fired from catapults over the sea. Little of the camp buildings survive and it is now the site of a holiday park.

== Geology ==
Doniford bay has Jurassic fossils in the cliffs. Charmouth fossils collects a number of their fossils from Doniford.

The largest Ichthyosaurus fossil discovered was found in Doniford Bay and taken to a museum in Hanover. When it was examined in 2017 it was revealed as the largest specimen described.

== Governance ==
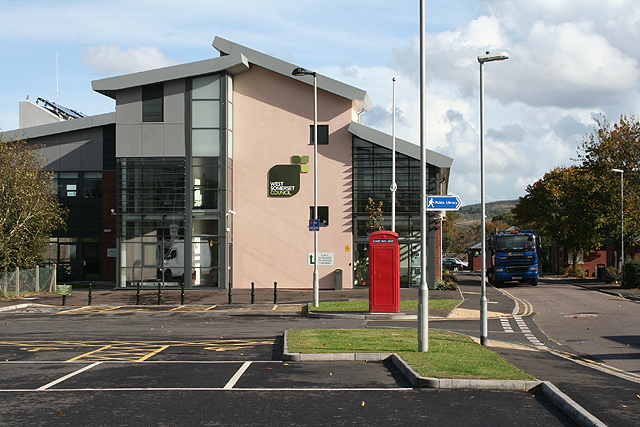
West Somerset Council offices in the village

The parish council has responsibility for local issues, including setting an annual precept (local rate) to cover the council's operating costs and producing annual accounts for public scrutiny. The parish council evaluates local planning applications and works with the local police, district council officers, and neighbourhood watch groups on matters of crime, security, and traffic. The parish council's role also includes initiating projects for the maintenance and repair of parish facilities, as well as consulting with the district council on the maintenance, repair, and improvement of highways, drainage, footpaths, public transport, and street cleaning. Conservation matters (including trees and listed buildings) and environmental issues are also the responsibility of the council. All other services and administrative functions are the responsibility of Somerset Council, a unitary authority established in April 2023.

For local government purposes, since 1 April 2023, the parish comes under the unitary authority of Somerset Council. Prior to this, it was part of the non-metropolitan district of Somerset West and Taunton (formed on 1 April 2019) and, before this, the district of West Somerset (established under the Local Government Act 1972). It was part of Williton Rural District before 1974.

It is also part of the Tiverton and Minehead constituency represented in the House of Commons of the Parliament of the United Kingdom.

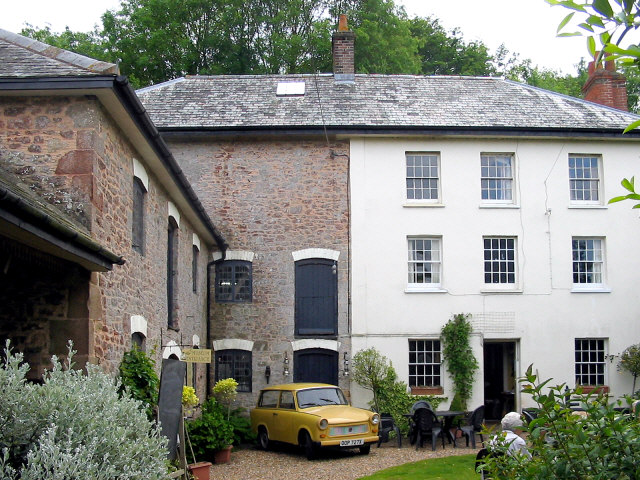
The Bakelite Museum

== Tourism ==
Williton is a good centre for visiting the Quantock Hills, the Brendons and Exmoor as well as the coast at Minehead, Dunster, Blue Anchor and Watchet, which are on the West Somerset Coast Path. Accommodation may be obtained in the village. There are facilities nearby for camping, sailing and wind-surfing as well as the usual beach activities. On the nearby cliffs fossils are exposed. There is easy access to the West Somerset Railway, which is the longest private railway in the country, and is run by a trust.

Places of interest are the Bakelite Museum and the Tropiquaria Zoo at the old radio station. Halsway Folk Music Centre is not far away.

The village lies on the route of the Macmillan Way West and Celtic Way Exmoor Option.

== Facilities ==
=== Emergency services ===
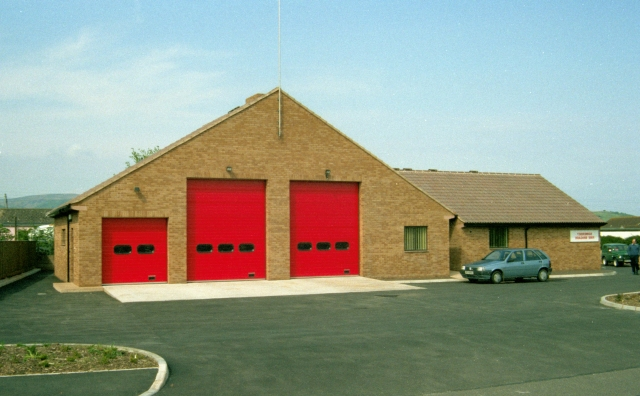
Williton fire station

There is a police station in Priest Street and both a hospital and fire station off North Street.

=== Medical ===
The Medical Centre at the end of Killick Way has a doctors surgery and pharmacy. Williton Hospital, off North Street, is a part of the Somerset Coast Primary Care Trust but does not have a casualty department. The nearest dentists are in Williton or Minehead.

=== Educational ===
The West Somerset area uses a three-tier education system. St Peters Church of England First School was opened on its present site in Doniford Road in 1996. It has five classes of mixed ability. There is a fairly large middle school — Danesfield Church of England — which caters for children between 9 and 13. Older students generally travel to the West Somerset College in Minehead.

Danesfield is also the centre for community education classes. There is a Somerset County library in Killick Way (closed Tuesdays).

=== Religious ===
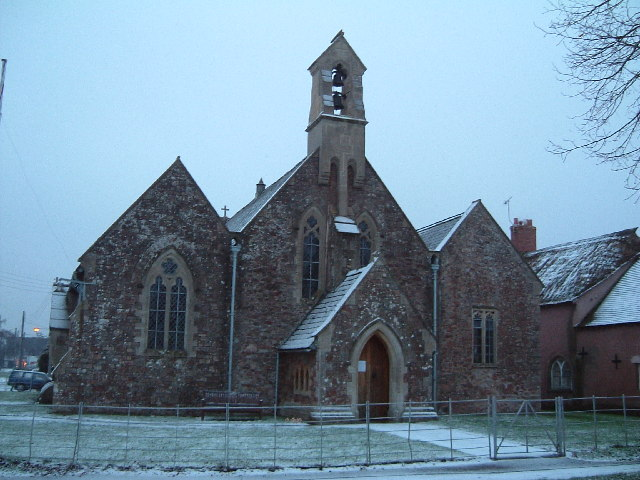
St Peter's Church

The date of the origin of St Peter's Church in Bridge Street is uncertain but it is believed that God has been worshiped on the site for more than 1000 years. The names of the Priests serving the Church and the parish can be traced back go the 13th century. The status of the Church changed dramatically in 1170 when The Lord of the manor, Sir Reginald Fitzurse, became one of the murderers of St Thomas a Becket. Following the murder the ownership of the manor passed to Reginald's brother Robert and the Knights Templar. The historian Collinson, writing in 1792, recorded that Robert rebuilt the chapel of Williton implying that the Saxon chapel was in ruins. The Liber Albus manuscripts in Wells Cathedral library show Robert gave to the Church of St Decuman, Watchet some important property and certain rights in the chapel. The church at Williton thus became very much a daughter Church of Watchet and became known as a Chapel of Ease.

The current building is mostly from the 16th century and is now a Grade II* listed building. Further work was undertaken in the 17th century when the Church was known as All Saints. Further work was done from time to time and in 1810 a south extension was built though the Elizabethan windows were relocated and reused in the south wall. The church fell into a state if disrepair and in 1856 suffered a rather over enthusiastic restoration under the architect Charles Edmund Giles. The Priest responsible for the big restoration of 1856/59, Samuel Heathcote (at the Church 1854 to 1906), was appointed Perpetual Curate but was signing the registers as Vicar from 21 November 1889 showing that Williton had become a parish separate from Watchet. The full details of the Church are recorded in Harry Armstrong's book The Parish of St Peter Williton published privately in 1982 and printed by Langley Print of Taunton.

Williton also has a Methodist Chapel.

=== Social and sport ===
There is a recreation ground with a children's area. A new community hall (Williton Pavilion) has now been built after many years of fund raising and a National Lottery grant. The project was opposed by a small part of the local community, which is mostly people who live nearby and do not want the younger members of the community having more activities. There are many social activities within Williton including the social club which needs updating, bowling club, gardening club, rifle club, Women's Institute, Good Neighbours Club, British Legion and Young Farmers. The Scout Association and Girlguiding UK meet regularly.

There is a weekly country market every Friday. A supermarket was proposed by a local businessman but there is large opposition.

There is also a riding school located on Roughmore industrial estate open to anyone who wants to learn the equestrian arts.

There are various Martial arts clubs including Judo, Ju-Jitsu, and Karate.

The Bowmen of Danesfied is a local West Somerset Archery club that shoot at Danesfield School. The club runs regular beginners course for those wishing to get into the sport of archery.

=== Transport ===
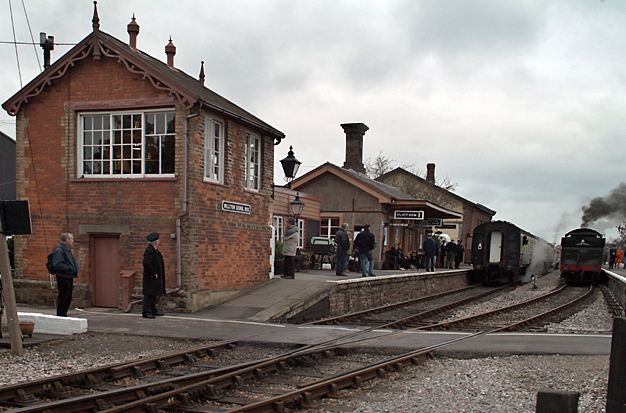
Williton Station

Buses run to Taunton and Minehead for which timetables are available from the post office. There are also buses to nearby supermarkets.

Williton railway station is on the preserved West Somerset Railway, which operates on most days through the year.

There is a voluntary car service called WHEELs for those without transport for shopping, visits to the doctor etc.

== Demographics ==
In the 2001 census Williton parish had 1,163 male and 1,411 female residents living in 1,103 households, with 27% being over 65 years. Of all residents, 62% described their health as good.

== Publications ==
Williton has a regular monthly newsletter, delivered free to all homes in the village, called the Williton Window. The slogan is 'Your church and community magazine'. An information pack is available to newcomers through Williton Window.

A book showing Williton as it used to be is The Book of Williton.

An information leaflet on West Somerset organisations is available from the West Somerset Free Press.
