= Doniford Halt railway station =

Railway station in Somerset, England

Doniford Halt
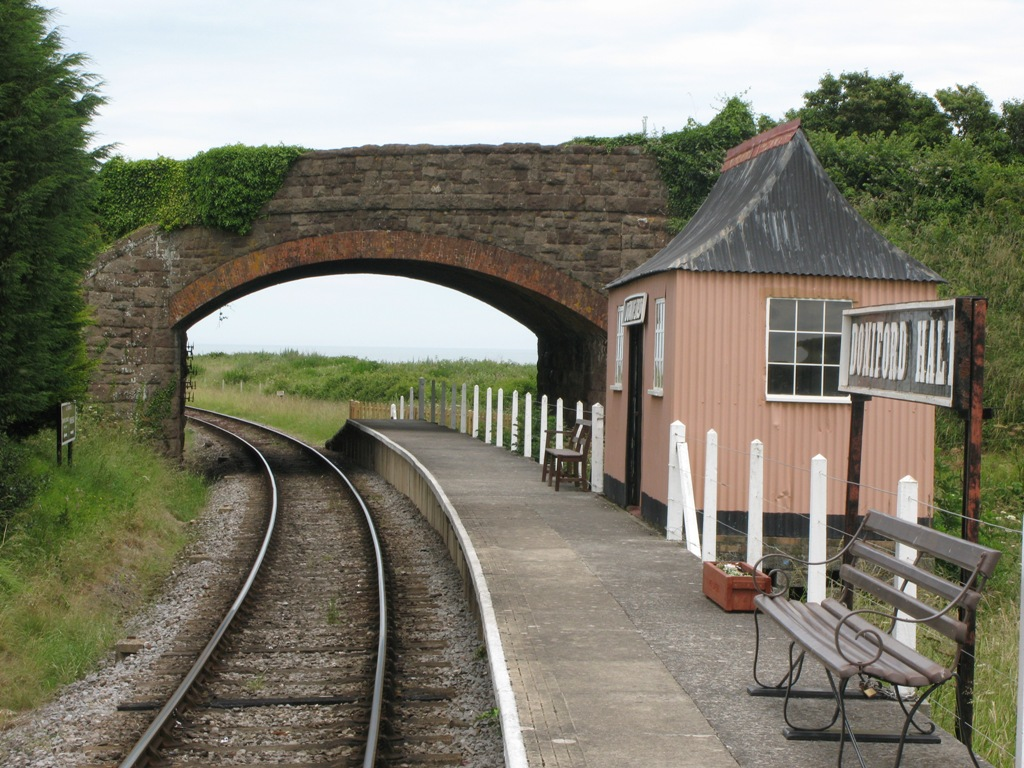

General information
- Location: Watchet, Somerset; England
- Coordinates: 51.1785°N 3.3111°W
- Grid reference: ST084429
- Operator: West Somerset Railway
- Platforms: 1

History
- Original company: West Somerset Railway

Key dates
- 1987: Opened
Location

Doniford Halt railway station is a request stop situated on the West Somerset Railway, England. It is situated near the Doniford Beach on Helwell Bay between Watchet and Williton.

== History ==
The railway line was originally opened in 1862 and closed in 1971, but it was reopened by the West Somerset Railway on 28 August 1976. Doniford Beach Halt was opened on 27 June 1987 to serve the holiday camp built on the site of the nearby former Doniford army base.

== Description ==
The curved platform is situated on the north side of the line where it passes beneath the Watchet to West Quantoxhead coast road. The platform is built from concrete panels recovered from Montacute on the former branch line from Durston to Yeovil Pen Mill and the shelter is a former Great Western Railway pagoda made from corrugated iron which was recovered from Cove Halt on the Exe Valley Railway.

== Services ==
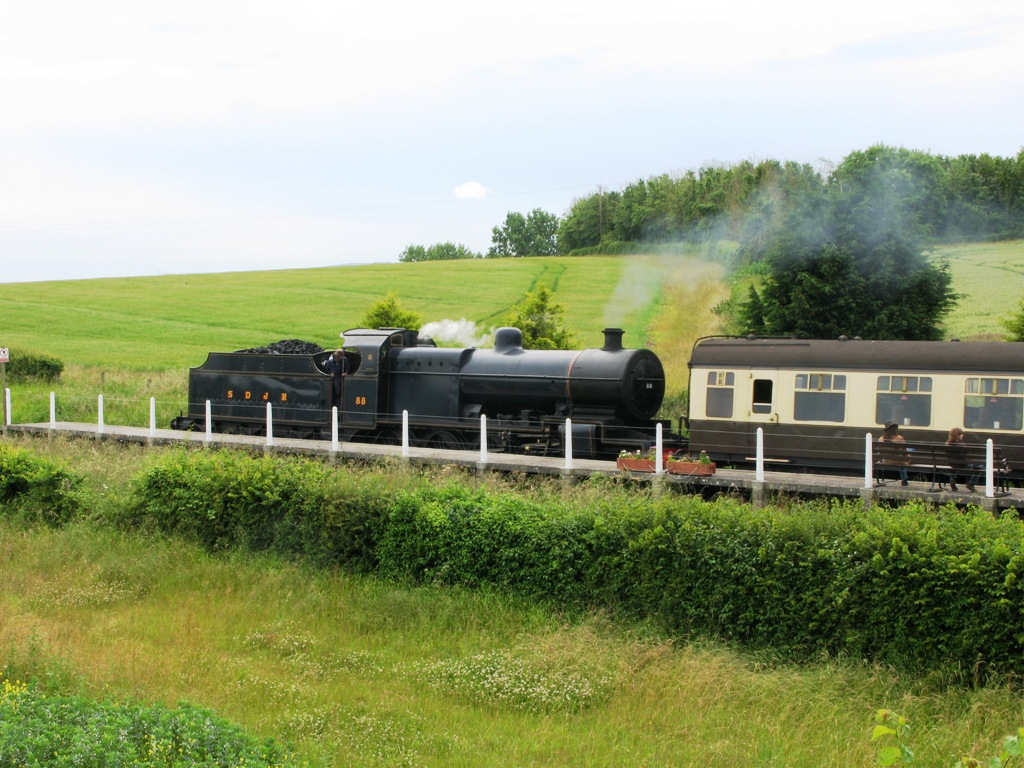
A train to Bishops Lydeard

Trains run between Minehead and Bishops Lydeard at weekends and on some other days from March to October, daily during the late spring and summer, and on certain days during the winter. Trains only call by request so passengers waiting to join are asked to make a clear signal to the driver as the train approaches, and people wanting to alight need to inform the train’s guard in good time.

Preceding station	Heritage railways	Following station
Watchet towards Minehead	West Somerset Railway	Williton towards Bishops Lydeard
