= Watchet railway station =

Heritage railway station in Somerset, England

Watchet
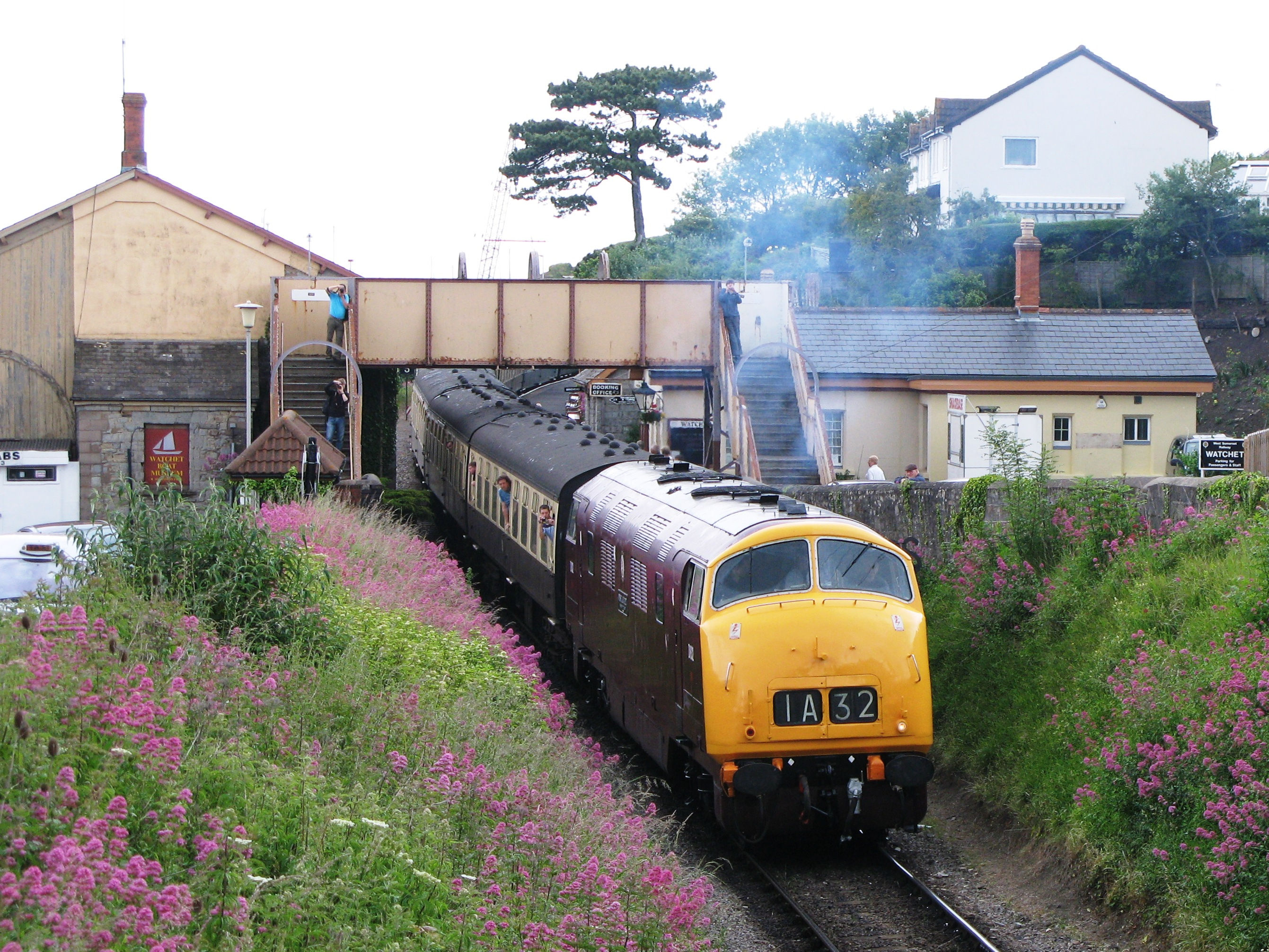

General information
- Location: Watchet, Somerset; England
- Coordinates: 51.1808°N 3.3301°W
- Grid reference: ST071432
- System: Station on heritage railway
- Operator: West Somerset Railway
- Platforms: 1

History
- Original company: West Somerset Railway
- Post-grouping: Great Western Railway

Key dates
- 31 March 1862: Opened
- 4 January 1971: Closed
- 28 March 1976: Opened in preservation
Location

Watchet railway station is a station on the West Somerset Railway, a heritage railway in Somerset, England. It is situated in the small harbour town of Watchet.

== History ==
=== Terminus: 1862–1873 ===
The station opened on 31 March 1862 when the West Somerset Railway (WSR) opened from Norton Junction (later Norton Fitzwarren), serving as the WSR's original line terminus. Watchet was chosen as the WSR line's terminus, as it had been since the Middle Ages an important regional port on the Bristol Channel. Local iron ore, timber and paper products were exported, whilst from the same time, it had become an important national port for the import of French wine and salt. The commercial aim of the WSR in choosing Watchet as its terminus was hence to provide a wider and cheaper distribution route for goods from the port.

The station forecourt originally linked both the station building and goods shed, hence the now unusual alignment of the station building facing towards Taunton. From the planning stage, the harbour was to be served by a network of tracks, reached by way of a steep incline down from the goods shed. The compact area available and the steep access inclines restricted the maximum shunting length to six railway wagons. On the mainline access track from the northeast, there was a goods loop and sidings to allow easier shunting and composition of outbound freight trains from the harbour. An engine shed was also located here, which remained open until 1882. The harbour tracks and goods tracks remained in place until the line was closed by British Railways in 1971.

The harbour was also linked to the independent West Somerset Mineral Railway, which brought iron ore from mines in the Brendon Hills southwest of the town, with the mineral railway tracks running further inland, roughly parallel with the mainline as far as Washford.

=== Development: 1874 ===
On 16 July 1874 the line was extended westwards by the Minehead Railway Company, and an industrial railway siding was also provided for Wansbrough Paper Mill. The footbridge was built to maintain the public right of way when the line was extended across the original forecourt to Minehead. A signal box on the embankment above the platform was provided to handle traffic on the line to Minehead.

Both lines were operated by the Bristol and Exeter Railway which became a part of the Great Western Railway (GWR) in 1876. The Minehead Railway was taken over by the Great Western in 1897, but the West Somerset Railway remained an independent company until 1922 when it too was absorbed by the Great Western.

=== GWR 1930s development ===
The GWR increased the capacity of the line in the 1930s. Because of the position of the goods shed opposite the platform, it was not possible to add a second track and platform, and a passing loop was constructed at Kentford just 0.75 miles (1.21 km) west of the station. It opened on 10 July 1933 but the signal box was only used during the daytime each summer.

Nationalisation in 1948 saw the GWR become the Western Region of British Railways. On 24 August 1952, the signal box at Washford closed, and the one at Kentford remained open until 7 May 1964 when it also closed. Freight traffic was withdrawn on 6 July 1964 and passenger trains on 4 January 1971.

=== Preservation ===
The station was reopened by the new West Somerset Railway on 28 August 1976.

== Description ==
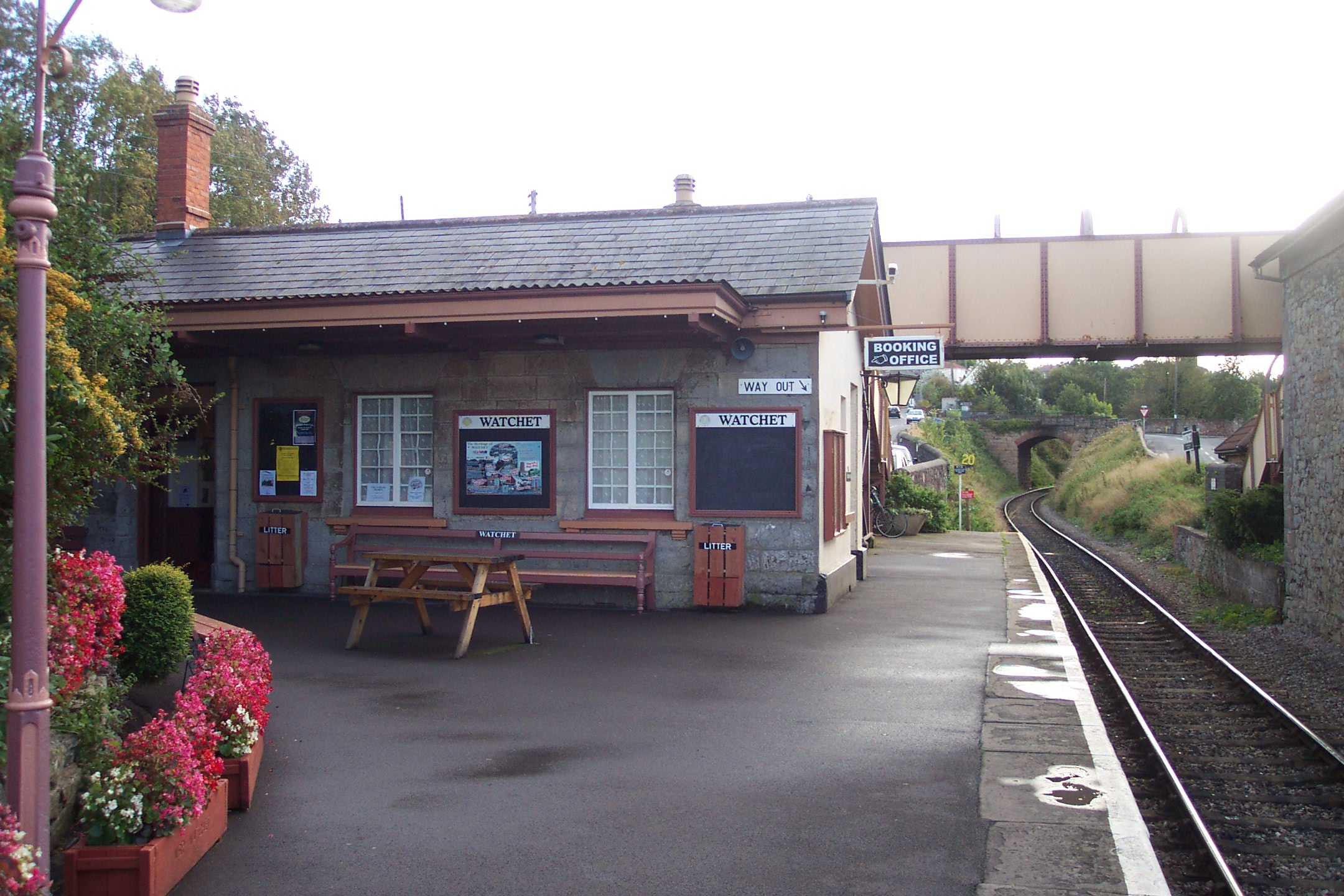
The ticket office

The station still has a single platform and station building, located on the opposite side of the single track running line from Watchet town centre and harbour. It is connected to them by a footbridge at the west end of the station, and a pedestrian level crossing at the east end. The former goods shed on the opposite side of the track is now occupied by the Watchet Boat Museum.

== Services ==
Trains run between Minehead and Bishops Lydeard at weekends and on some other days from February to October, daily during the late spring and summer, and on certain days during the winter.

| Preceding station | Heritage railways | Following station |
|---|---|---|
| Washford towards Minehead | West Somerset Railway | Doniford Halt towards Bishops Lydeard |
