= West Somerset Railway =

Heritage railway line in Somerset, England

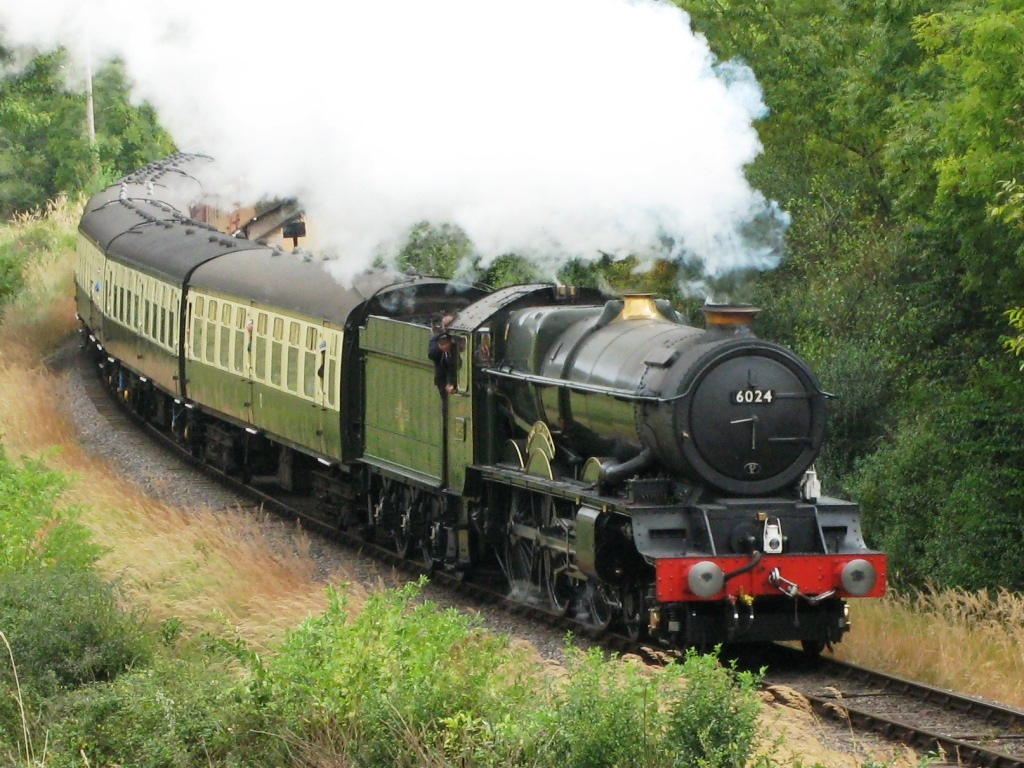
- 6024 King Edward I climbing towards Keniton
- Locale: Somerset
- Terminus: Minehead; Bishops Lydeard

Commercial operations
- Built by: West Somerset Railway; Minehead Railway
- Original gauge: 7 ft 1/4 in (2,140 mm)

Preserved operations
- Operated by: West Somerset Railway plc
- Stations: 11
- Length: 22.75 miles (36.61 km)
- Preserved gauge: 4 ft 8 1/2 in (1,435 mm)

Commercial history
- Opened: 1862
- 1862: Opened Taunton to Watchet
- 1874: Opened Watchet to Minehead
- 1882: Converted to 4 ft 8 1/2 in (1,435 mm)
- Closed: 1973

Preservation history
- 1975: Light Railway Order granted
- 1976: Reopened Minehead to Williton
- 1978: Reopened Williton to Stogumber
- 1979: Reopened Stogumber to Bishops Lydeard
- 1987: New station at Doniford
- 2009: New station at Norton Fitzwarren
- Headquarters: Minehead

The West Somerset Railway (WSR) is a 22.75-mile (36.6 km) heritage railway line in Somerset, England. The freehold of the line and stations is owned by Somerset Council. The railway is leased to and operated by West Somerset Railway plc (WSR plc), which is supported and minority-owned by the West Somerset Railway Association (WSRA) charitable trust and the West Somerset Railway Heritage Trust (WSRHT). WSR operates services using both heritage steam and diesel trains.

It originally opened in 1862 between Taunton and Watchet. In 1874 it was extended from Watchet to Minehead by the Minehead Railway. Although just a single line, improvements were needed in the first half of the twentieth century to accommodate the significant number of tourists that wished to travel to the Somerset coast. The line was closed by British Rail in 1971 and reopened in 1976 as a heritage line.

It is the longest standard gauge independent heritage railway in the United Kingdom. Services normally operate over just the 20.5 miles (33.0 km) between Minehead and Bishops Lydeard. During special events some trains continue a further two miles (3.2 km) to Norton Fitzwarren where a connection to Network Rail allows occasional through trains to operate onto the national network.

== History ==
In 1845, when the Bristol and Exeter Railway (B&ER) had recently completed its main line, there were proposals for a number of different and competitive railway schemes in west Somerset. A Bristol and English Channels Direct Junction Railway was proposed as a link from Watchet through Stogumber and Bishops Lydeard to Bridport on the south coast, which would be an alternative to ships taking a long and dangerous passage around Land's End. This prompted the promotion of a connecting line from Williton to Minehead and Porlock, a line designed to attract tourists to Exmoor. Shortly afterwards, a Bristol and English Channels Connection Railway was suggested from Stolford to Bridport which would have passed through the Quantock Hills near Crowcombe. Alternatively, the Bridgwater and Minehead Junction Railway would link with the B&ER at Bridgwater and run through Williton to Minehead with a branch to Watchet and a connecting Minehead and Central Devon Junction Railway would provide a line to Exeter. An alternative link to South Devon was proposed by the Exeter, Tiverton and Minehead Direct Railway through Dunster and offered an extension to Ilfracombe.

=== West Somerset Railway Company ===
None of these schemes were pursued and it was to be more than ten years before schemes for railways in the area were to be again proposed.

On 9 July 1856, local land owner Sir Peregrine Fuller Palmer Acland of Fairfield House, Stogursey arranged a meeting at the Egremont Hotel in Williton. The advertised purpose was to discuss a "Railway from the West Somerset iron-fields and coast, to the Bristol & Exeter Railway," proposed to connect Watchet – then a major port on the River Severn, as well as one of the largest industrial towns in Somerset, although in decline in importance thanks to the railways – to join the B&ER at either the county town of Taunton or the large port town of Bridgwater. The promoters had already approached Isambard Kingdom Brunel for his views as the former engineer of the B&ER, and by the time of the meeting he had already undertaken a preliminary survey of the alternative routes. There were three alternate options:

- The Rev. J. Llewellyn, of Wiveliscombe, suggested a route leaving the existing WSMR at Washford, then passing through Monksilver, Elworthy, Brompton Regis, Ford, Milverton and Hillfarrance, and onwards to the B&ER.
- The second and third options bypassed the WSMR, running directly from Watchet to Williton to follow the Donniford valley to Crowcombe, and then either:
  - To Triscombe and via a tunnel through the Quantock Hills to Bridgewater. The promoters were initially keen to build the tunnel, as the Ironstone in this part of Somerset was similar to that found in South Wales, amongst which were found rich seams of coal
  - Or directly onwards to Taunton, and via the B&ER to Bridgwater

In his contribution, Brunel described the valley of "a little brook called Donniford Brook" as being of prime importance to any route. He had concluded that the starting point should be either Watchet or Porlock, then direct to Williton to follow the Donniford Brook as far as Triscombe. Brunel then gave the initial calculations on the required tunnel to reach Bridgwater, which being 70 to 80 chains in length would require 50 shafts to be sunk, and as it also required approaches with a 1 in 50 gradient, would be very expensive. In his conclusion, Brunel stated his preference as a route from Watchet via Williton to Taunton, stating it to be both cheaper and offering more development options to increase passenger loading.

The first meeting had been dominated by people from Minehead, Wiveliscombe and Bridgwater but, on 1 August 1856, a second meeting was held in Taunton. Brunel explained to those present the advantages of the different routes and gave some weight to the argument for a route to Bridgwater with a long tunnel under the Quantocks. He also suggested that the line should be continued to Minehead or Porlock but the meeting resolved to construct a railway only from Taunton to Watchet.

West Somerset Railway Act 1857
- Act of Parliament
- Parliament of the United Kingdom
- Long title: An Act to authorize the Construction of a Railway from Taunton to the Harbour of Watchet; and for other Purposes relating to the said Railway and Harbour.
- Citation: 20 & 21 Vict. c. cxlv

Dates
- Royal assent: 17 August 1857

Text of statute as originally enacted

Brunel was engaged to undertake a more detailed survey and the B&ER agreed to operate the line for ten years in return for 45% of the receipts. Plans were produced as required by British law in November 1856 and the West Somerset Railway Company was incorporated on 17 August 1857 by the West Somerset Railway Act 1857 (20 & 21 Vict. c. cxlv) to build a railway from Taunton to Watchet. A prospectus was issued to raise the required £120,000 and these were all subscribed by the end of the year.

The railway's engineer, George Furness of London, started construction on 7 April 1859 at Crowcombe and construction lasted for nearly three years. The railway opened for passengers from Watchet Junction (2 miles or 3.2 kilometres west of Taunton) to Watchet on 31 March 1862; goods traffic commenced in August. Trains were operated through to Taunton railway station as no station was provided at the junction. On 8 June 1871 a second junction was brought into use where the WSR joined the B&ER main line for the Devon and Somerset Railway and a station was finally opened here, known as Norton Fitzwarren, on 8 June 1871 but branch line trains continued to operate through to Taunton.

=== Minehead Railway ===
Minehead Railway Act 1865
- Act of Parliament
- Parliament of the United Kingdom
- Long title: An Act to authorize the Construction of a Railway from Watchet to Minehead in the County of Somerset.
- Citation: 28 & 29 Vict. c. cccxvii

Dates
- Royal assent: 5 July 1865

Text of statute as originally enacted

Minehead Railway Act 1871
- Act of Parliament
- Parliament of the United Kingdom
- Long title: An Act for making a Railway from the West Somerset Railway at Watchet to Minehead in the county of Somerset; and for other purposes.
- Citation: 34 & 35 Vict. c. xcvi

Dates
- Royal assent: 29 June 1871

Text of statute as originally enacted

The West Somerset Mineral Railway (WSMR) was intended to link the iron-ore mines of the Brendon Hills with the harbour at Watchet. In 1856, before it was even opened, it was suggested that the WSMR should be extended to Minehead instead of the WSR and the West Somerset Mineral Railway Act 1857 authorising this work was passed on 27 July 1857 but it was never constructed. Instead, the Minehead Railway Act 1865 (28 & 29 Vict. c. cccxvii) was passed on 5 July 1865 for a new company to build a line from the WSR at Watchet to Minehead. This again failed to be built but a renewed Minehead Railway Act 1871 (34 & 35 Vict. c. xcvi) of 29 June 1871 finally saw the construction begin the following year.

The new railway was opened on 16 July 1874. In 1871, the WSR had agreed a new perpetual lease to the B&ER for a fixed sum each year which rose annually to a maximum of £6,600. The new Minehead Railway too was leased to the B&ER which then operated the two railways as a single branch from Taunton. To break up the 22.75 miles (36.6 km) of single track, a passing loop and second platform were installed at Williton, 13 miles (21 km) from the junction.

=== Part of the Great Western ===
On 1 January 1876, the B&ER was amalgamated into the Great Western Railway (GWR). To increase the capacity of the West Somerset line, another loop was opened in 1879 at Crowcombe Heathfield. The 7 ft (2,134 mm) broad gauge was converted to 4 ft 8 1/2 in (1,435 mm) standard gauge in 1882. Trains ran as usual on Saturday 28 October but the track was lifted the following day and reopened for traffic on Monday afternoon.

The Minehead Railway was amalgamated into the GWR by the Great Western Railway (Additional Powers) Act 1897 (60 & 61 Vict. c. ccxlviii), but the West Somerset Railway remained an independent company for the time being although all its assets continued to be leased to the bigger company. Under Great Western influence, there were steady improvements in the line as it carried an increasing level of holiday traffic to the Somerset coast and Exmoor. The platform at Stogumber was extended in 1900, a new passing loop was opened in 1904 at Blue Anchor and, the following year, a second platform was opened at Minehead. A third loop was installed in 1906, this time at Bishops Lydeard and the loop at Williton was lengthened in 1907.

Under the Railways Act 1921, the West Somerset Railway Company was finally amalgamated into the Great Western Railway but the Minehead branch, as the route was now known, continued to be operated by the newly enlarged GWR.

In the 1930s, alterations were made to significantly increase the number and length of trains that could be handled. The mainline from Norton Fitzwarren through Taunton to Cogload Junction was increased from two to four tracks on 2 December 1931 and the junction station was enlarged which meant that it was better able to cope with the trains on all three routes. In 1933, the platform at Stogumber was extended to accommodate longer trains and two further passing loops were opened. These were at Leigh Bridge south of Stogumber and at Kentford west of Watchet. The following year saw the original single track doubled between Dunster and Minehead and the platform at the terminus was lengthened. The loop at Blue Anchor was also lengthened in 1934, the line was doubled from Norton Fitzwarren to Bishops Lydeard in 1936 and the Williton loop was lengthened for a second time in 1937. Camp coaches were placed at Blue Anchor from 1934 to 1939 and at Stogumber from 1935 to 1939, which encouraged holiday makers to use the train to reach these rural locations. In 1936, the GWR's chairman, Sir Robert Horne, opened the new £20,000 open-air swimming pool at Minehead.

=== Run down to closure ===
The GWR was nationalised, becoming the Western Region of British Railways on 1 January 1948. Camp coaches made a reappearance in 1952 and were available to the public at both Stogumber and Blue Anchor from 1952 to 1964; the latter were kept on for British Rail staff holidays until 1970.

However, Washford signal box was closed in 1952 and Minehead engine shed was closed in 1956. Norton Fitzwarren station closed on 30 October 1961, after which passengers once again had to travel through to Taunton to change onto trains travelling west.

Despite the opening of a Butlins holiday camp at Minehead in 1962 which brought some 30,000 people to the town that year, the line was recommended for closure in the 1963 Reshaping of British Railways report. Goods traffic was withdrawn from Stogumber on 17 August 1963 and from the other stations on 6 July 1964 after which British Rail transported any goods traffic by road from Taunton. By this time the passing loops at Leigh Bridge and Kentford had been taken out of use, in April and May 1964 respectively.

The Beatles visited the branch on 2 March 1964 to film part of A Hard Day's Night. They shot a short scene at Crowcombe Heathfield in which Ringo Starr and George Harrison cycle on the platform alongside the train. The train originated at London Paddington and eventually arrived at Minehead where a large crowd of admirers gathered to see the Fab Four.

Minehead signal box was closed on 27 March 1966 after which the two tracks between there and Dunster were operated as two bi-directional single lines, one to each platform. Dunster Signal Box was retained to control the level crossing and points there, and ground frames allowed the train crew to change the points at Minehead to allow locomotives to run round from one end of the train to the other. The original turntable was removed from Minehead in 1967 by which time all trains were operated by diesels.

With the line still proposed for closure, the Transport Users Consultative Committee heard from the Western National bus company that it would require twenty buses in the summer to cope with the influx of holidaymakers, but that most would be idle for much of the year when far fewer people travelled to Minehead and the surrounding district. In an attempt to make the loss-making line profitable, BR reduced the double track from Norton Fitzwarren to one track on 1 March 1970 and closed the signal boxes at Bishops Lydeard and Norton Fitzwarren. This left the branch with three sections (Silk Mills to Williton; Williton to Dunster; Dunster to Minehead) but still required seven staff per shift as there were three signal boxes and four level crossings. The line continued to make a loss so was eventually closed. The last train left Minehead on 2 January 1971; this was a Saturday and the following Monday 4 an enhanced bus service came into operation.

=== Closure ===
Over the following five-year period, the line was kept in "possible to return to operations" status, but lineside shrubbery quickly took over the infrastructure. In 1975, after Butlins Minehead holiday camp decided to modernise and refurbish, it was proposed to extract LMS Princess Coronation Class 6229 Duchess of Hamilton, purchased by Billy Butlin in 1966 along with LB&SCR A1 class Knowle (transported out by road), under an offer made by British Railways. This required a full-time two-week incursion of a permanent way team to clear the line pathway, before BR Class 25 diesel No.25 059 and a BR brakevan could make a 20 miles per hour (32 km/h) traverse in March 1975. The trackwork of the run round loop of No.1 platform was removed from the upline at Minehead, to allow transporter Pickfords to make a suitable railhead connection to enable release of No.6229 Duchess of Hamilton.

=== Heritage railway ===
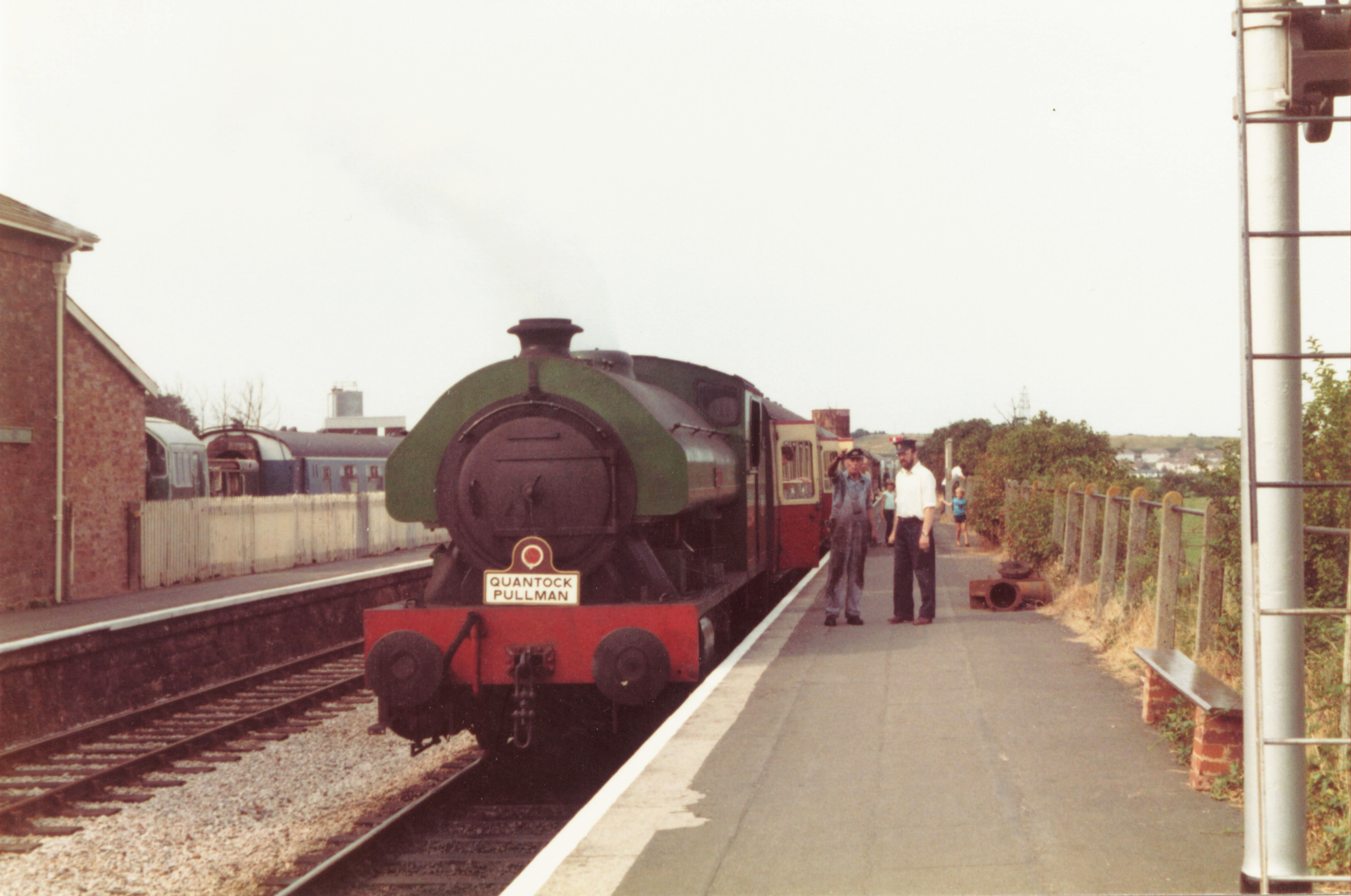
Vulcan at Williton in 1981

On 5 February 1971, a Minehead Railway Preservation Society organised a meeting in Taunton and a working party headed by Douglas Fear, a local businessman, was tasked with investigating how the line could be reopened as a privately owned railway. In May, a new West Somerset Railway Company was formed to acquire the line and operate a year-round commuter service from Minehead to Taunton alongside which a limited summer steam service could also run. A deal was agreed with British Rail to purchase the line with the support of Somerset County Council, however the council was wary of the lucrative Minehead station site falling into private hands should the railway fail. Instead, it purchased the line itself in 1973 and leased back the operational land to the West Somerset Railway Company plc.

The proposed commuter service never materialised, due to traffic restrictions between the newly installed Taunton Cider Company sidings at Norton Fitzwarren and Taunton, but the line was slowly reopened as a heritage railway. Minehead to Blue Anchor was the first section to see trains restored, opening on 28 March 1976 and services were extended to Williton on 28 August the same year. Trains returned to Stogumber on 7 May 1978 and they reached Bishops Lydeard on 9 June 1979. A new station at Doniford Halt was opened on the coast east of Watchet on 27 June 1987 to serve a holiday camp at Helwell Bay.

In 2004, work started on constructing a new triangle at Norton Fitzwarren which included a part of the old Devon and Somerset line, and a ballast reclamation depot opened there in 2006. In 2008, a new turntable was brought into use at Minehead. A new station opened on 1 August 2009 at Norton Fitzwarren on a new site a short distance north of the main line.

During 2007 a regular service ran from Minehead to Taunton and Bristol Temple Meads on a couple of days each week. Known as the Minehead Express, it was aimed at holidaymakers travelling to Butlins at Minehead. It left Minehead at 11:10 and Bristol at 14:06 with Victa Westlink's Class 31s 31452 and 31454 powering the five coaches. 31128 was available as a spare locomotive but was not used on the service trains. The first of these trains ran on 20 July and operated on a total of 18 days, finishing on 27 August.

Whilst the freehold of the line continues to be owned by Somerset County Council, during 2013 it was announced that both the WSRA and the WSR plc had approached the county council about the possibility of purchasing the freehold of the line. The council made the decision in late May 2014 not to sell the freehold after all.

A May 2018 county transport strategy acknowledged that there were plans to reintroduce services between Taunton and Minehead. Following an inspection by the Office of Rail and Road in 2018, it was announced that the railway would close from 2 January 2019, and would reopen on 1 April. The inspection found that several safety improvements needed to be made.

The line was suggested in 2019 by Campaign for a Better Transport as a 'priority 2' candidate for reopening as part of the national network. A business case put forward jointly by Somerset Council and West Somerset Railway for infrastructure improvements to enable regular scheduled through-running to Taunton to connect with National Rail services was rejected by the Department for Transport in May 2025.

== Route ==
The route is described from Minehead towards Taunton. Features are described as being on the left or right of the line for passengers facing this direction of travel, therefore the right side of the train is generally on the south or west of the line. On the railway this is known as the 'up' direction.

=== Minehead to Watchet ===
Communities served: Minehead – Dunster – Carhampton and Blue Anchor – Washford – Watchet

The station at Minehead is situated on the sea front close to the town centre. The platform has a track on each side and the old goods shed, which is now used for locomotive maintenance, is situated on the north side between the platform and the beach. On the opposite side of the station is a turntable and the station cafe. Sidings on both sides of the station are used to hold stock, both operating vehicles and others awaiting repairs in the workshops. At the far end of the station is the signal box and level crossing over Seaward Way, a link road from the A39 to the seafront that was built in the 1990s.

Trains leave Minehead heading south-eastwards on the longest straight and level section of track along the whole line, passing behind Butlin's holiday camp which is on the left between the railway and the sea and then across flat fields. 1.75 miles (2.8 km) from Minehead the line crosses Dunster West level crossing and enters Dunster station. It is a mile from the village of that name which is on the hill to the right along with Dunster Castle.

The platform at Dunster is on the right while the old goods yard on the left is now used by the WSR's civil engineering team who keep the tracks in good order. On leaving the station is another level crossing, this time over Sea Lane that leads down to Dunster Beach which can be glimpsed to the left of the train. A footpath leads from the east end of the platform down to Sea Lane to save a long walk round along the road. The line then continues across the concrete channel of the River Avill onto Ker Moor and along the edge of the beach to reach Blue Anchor, 3.5 miles (5.6 km) from Minehead and the first passing loop. Approaching the station, the old goods yard is on the right and three camp coaches are kept here where volunteers working on the railway can stay overnight. At the western end of the platform, a signal box overlooks a level crossing on the road from Blue Anchor to Carhampton. The West Somerset Steam Railway Trust's museum is on the right-hand platform.

The line now leaves the sea and swings inland in a south east direction, climbing at gradients up to 1 in 65 (1.5%), the steepest section of the line. After turning back towards the north east, the line reaches the second highest point on the line at Washford. This is 6.75 miles (10.86 km) from Minehead and has a single platform on the right. On the opposite side of the line, the goods yard and shed is now used by the West Somerset Railway Heritage Trust for restoration of their heritage carriages, following the vacating of the site by the Somerset and Dorset Railway Trust, who had occupied the site 1976–2023 and ran a museum there with a collection of rolling stock and a display of signalling equipment.

The line now swings north-eastwards and starts to descend, initially at 1 in 74 (1.35%). A footpath on the right of the line at a slightly lower level is the route of the old West Somerset Mineral Railway, which passes beneath the line on the approach to Watchet. After passing the former junction to the Wansbrough Paper Mill on the right, the line passes under a small road bridge, before arriving at Watchet railway station, 8 miles (13 km) from Minehead.

=== Watchet to Bishops Lydeard ===
Communities served: Watchet – Williton – Stogumber and Kingswood – Crowcombe – Bishops Lydeard

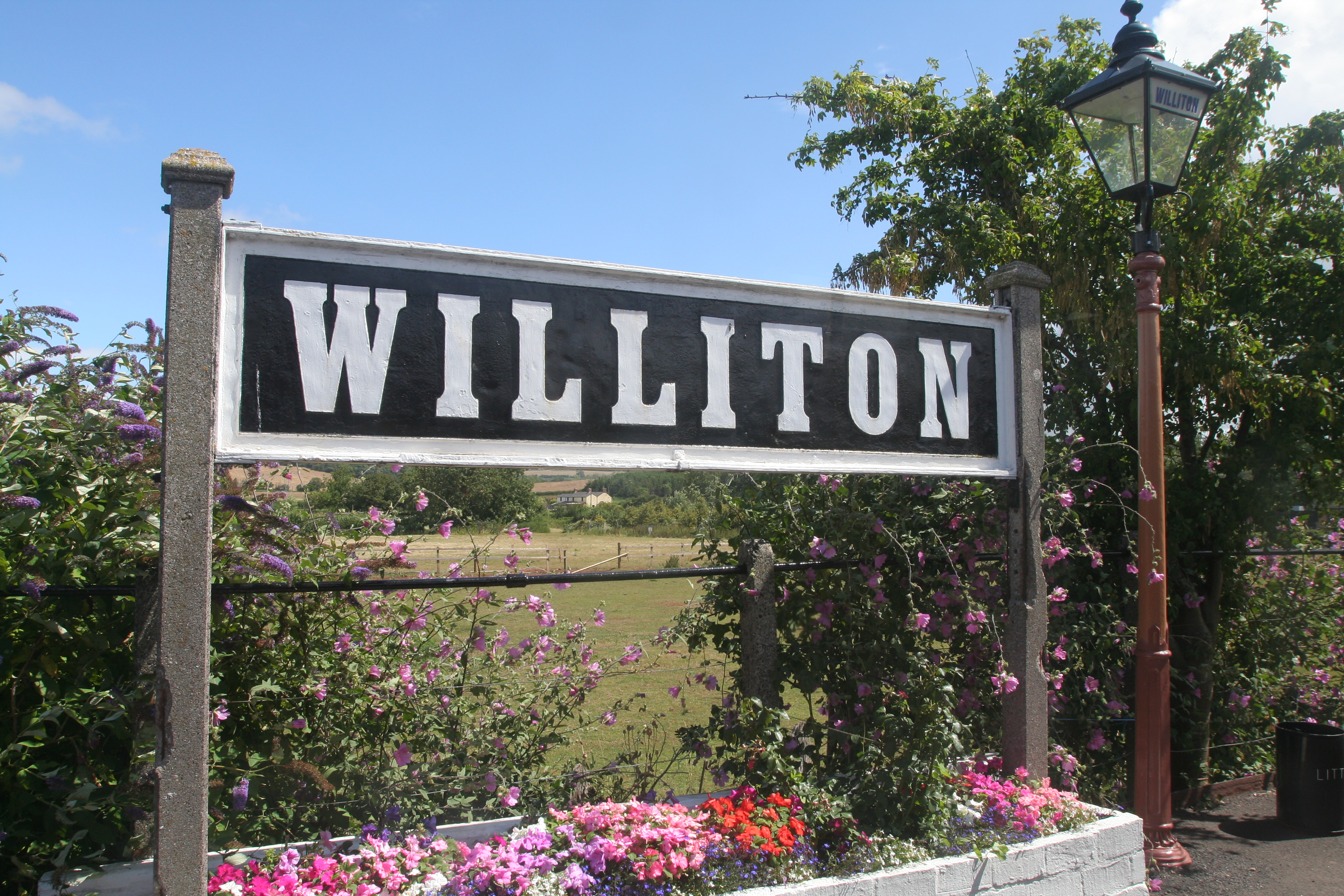
Station sign at Williton

The platform at Watchet is on the right of the train but the station building is unusually set back from the line and faces Taunton, a hangover from its construction as the terminus of the original West Somerset Railway. The old goods shed is opposite the platform and now houses the Watchet Boat Museum. A footbridge crosses the line at the Minehead end of the station and a foot crossing leads across the track at the other end of the platform which gives access to the harbour for train passengers.

The line climbs away into a cutting through a headland but soon swings round to a south-easterly direction along the cliff above Helwell Bay. Passing under the Watchet to West Quantoxhead road, the line turns southwards and passes the concrete platform at Doniford Halt, which is on the left of the train 9 miles (14 km) from Minehead. The agricultural landscape is then soon supplanted on the right by the sidings around the West Somerset Railway Association's (WSRA) workshops, which are housed in a corrugated iron building known as the Swindon Shed as it was originally built there more than 100 years ago. Watchet is being used as the terminus of trains from Bishops Lydeard in March and April 2019 due to engineering works at Minehead.

Williton railway station, at 9.75 miles (15.7 km), is near the midpoint of the operational railway and the second passing loop. Behind the platform on the right, next to the WSRA workshops, are the old goods shed and the more modern workshop which is the home to the Diesel and Electric Preservation Group's fleet of diesel locomotives. The main station building is also on this platform, as is the oldest signal box on the line which stands above the level crossing. This sees little road traffic as most crosses the railway on the A39 road bridge that stands just beyond the end of the passing loop. Next to the level crossing on the left of the line is a garden with a decorative box hedge that is over 100 years old.

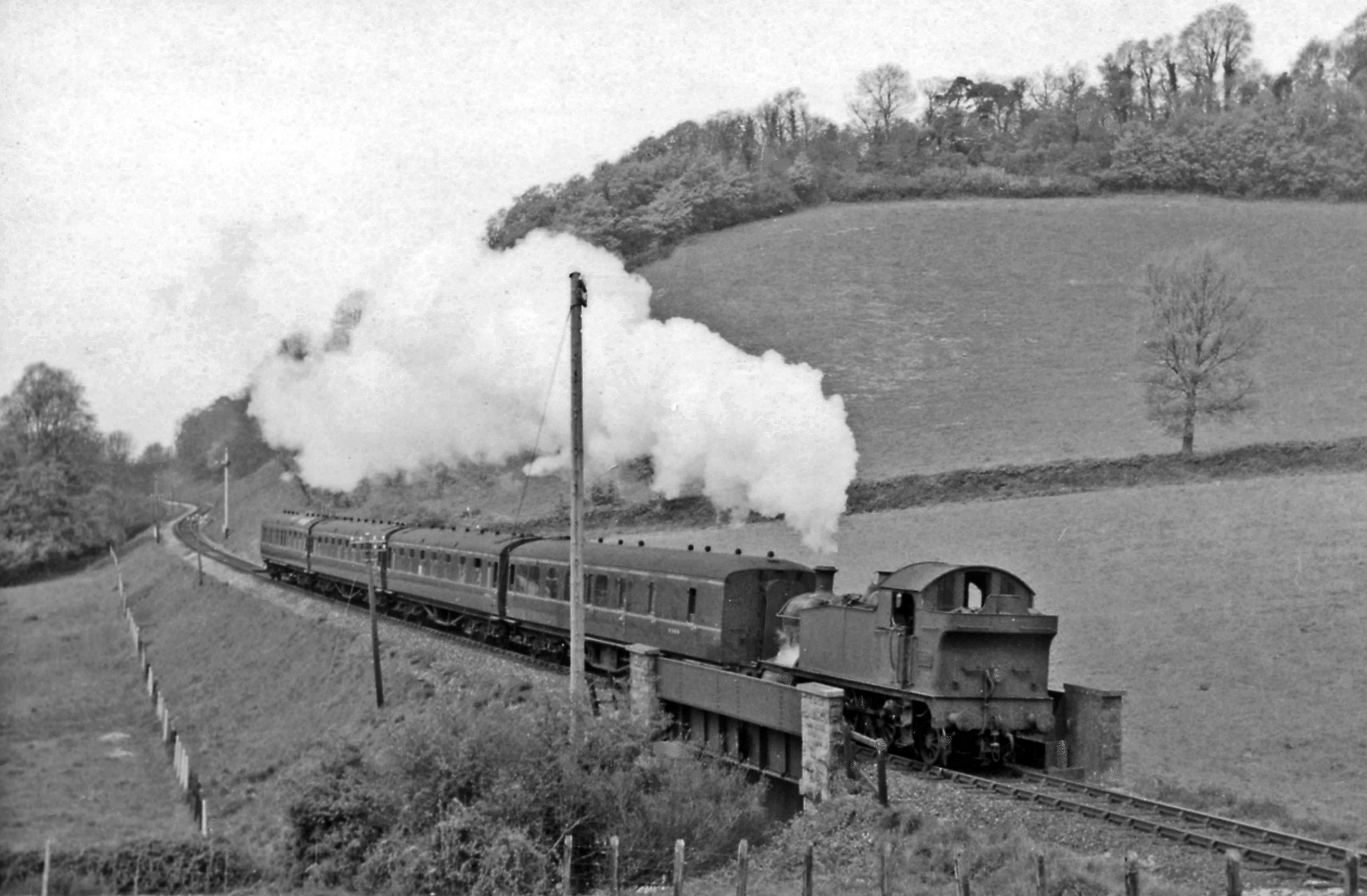
A train near Williton in 1960

Leaving Williton, the railway crosses over the A358 road and climbs up onto the side of the Quantock Hills. Passing close to the village of Bicknoller, it crosses the Macmillan Way West, a long-distance footpath. Following the eastern side of a steep valley, it continues to rise with sections at 1 in 100 and 1 in 92 (1.1%) as it approaches the small station at Stogumber, 13 miles (21 km) from Minehead. This station unusually has its platform on the right of the train but the station offices are on the left. The space alongside the offices is now a well-maintained garden but is where the goods shed used to stand.

The line continues to climb 1 in 92 up the valley until, 15.75 miles (25.3 km) from Minehead, it reaches the summit of the line at Crowcombe Heathfield. This is another passing loop but the down platform (on the right) is signalled to allow trains to run in either direction; the original platform was on the left of the line and so the main buildings are all on this side of the line. From the Minehead end, they include the old station master's house, some modern housing in sympathetic style and the station offices.

After leaving Crowcombe Heathfield, it is downhill, with sections as steep as 1 in 81 (1.2%). At Combe Florey, the line crosses the A358 two more times in quick succession and this remains close on the left of the line to Bishops Lydeard. This station has another passing loop and is the terminus of regular operations, 19.75 miles (31.78 km) from Minehead. Locomotives are kept in a secure compound on the left at the Taunton end of the station. Both platforms are signalled for running in either direction and most trains run from the one on the left, although the original buildings are all on the right. These include the goods shed which now houses a railway museum and the old station master's house.

=== Bishops Lydeard to Taunton ===
Communities served: Bishops Lydeard – Norton Fitzwarren – Taunton

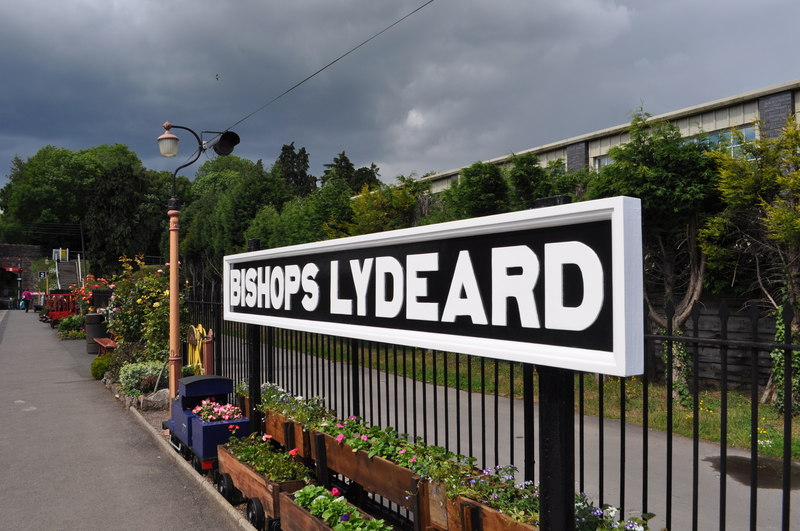
The station sign at Bishops Lydeard

This section beyond Bishops Lydeard carries no regularly scheduled passenger trains nowadays but occasional special services operate. During special events, a shuttle service is often operated between Bishops Lydeard and the new platform that opened at Norton Fitzwarren in 2009. A few special trains also operate over the link between the West Somerset Railway and Network Rail, running through to Taunton and beyond.

The line passes the Norton Manor Royal Marine camp on the left and then passes under Norton Bridge and the new Allerford Junction where a siding has been installed on the right to serve the West Somerset Railway Association's ballast reclamation depot. Just beyond the junction, on the right, is the concrete platform erected in 2009 at Norton Fitzwarren. The West Somerset Railway's line terminates here and trains running through to Taunton run onto Network Rail's tracks. The remains of the station hotel are seen on the left but the track joins the Bristol to Exeter line on the right. Passing the engineers' depot at Fairwater Yard on the right, one soon arrives at Taunton, the traditional junction station for trains running the 24.75 miles (39.83 km) to Minehead.

=== Norton Fitzwarren triangle ===
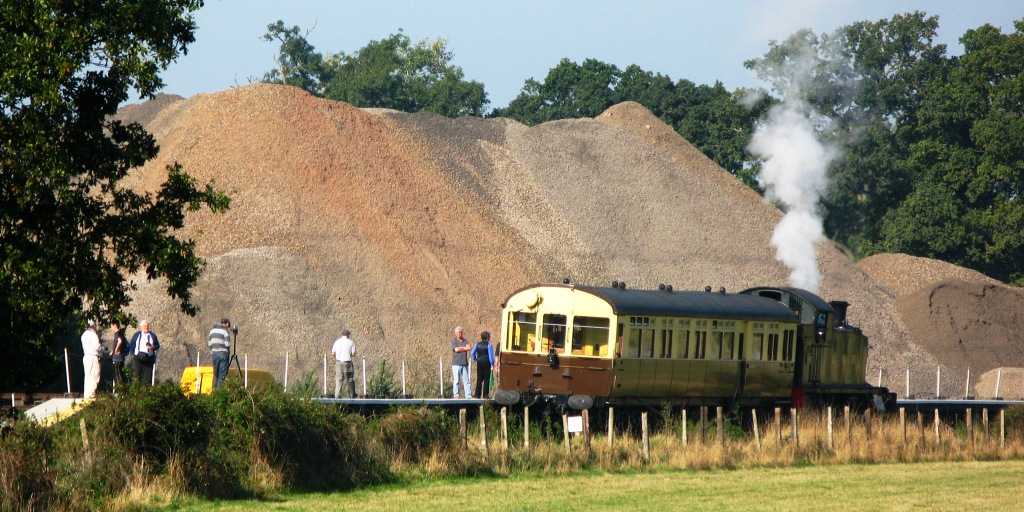
GWR Autocoach No.178 is propelled to Norton Fitzwarren station by auto-fitted 4575 Class 5542. Behind is the WSRA's ballast dump, which holds ballast to be used on the railway or resold as aggregates

On 24 March 2004, the WSRA announced the purchase of 33 acres (13 ha) of land at Norton Fitzwarren. The triangular piece of land is located between: the existing WSR line from Norton Bridge (B3227) south to the junction with Network Rail; the westward running residual trackbed of the Barnstaple branch from Network Rail junction to the first bridge (Allerford Bridge) over the former trackbed in the west; and the Barnstaple branch stub back north to Norton Bridge. The purchase of the land was announced as the first step in a 20-year programme to create a new train turning facility, alongside a national-scale "Heritage Railway Development" encompassing: an engine shed; carriage works; and railway engineering facility.

In 2009, just beyond the new Allerford Junction, the WSR constructed a new 4-carriage length station on the original WSR/Network Rail line, creating a new Norton Fitzwarren station on WSR metals, just west of the original GWR location.

Network Rail's (NR) Fairwater Yard track maintenance facility is a short distance east of Norton Fitzwarren. Due to the high costs of ballast disposal from the site, NR approached the railway about using the triangle site as a commercial recycling site, allowing reclaimed ballast to be used in the local construction industry. After gaining planning permission from Somerset County Council, and approval of a drainage plan from the Environment Agency (conditions of which stipulate that the site must be fully reverted to meadow pasture at the termination of ballast recycling operations) the WSRA came to an agreement with NR to utilise spent ballast and rail from their track renewals programme. NR maintenance trains occasionally run from Fairwater Yard to Norton Fitzwarren to drop off spent materials at the site. A commercial operator sorts the ballast under contract to the WSRA.

The funds generated from ballast recycling allowed the WSRA to develop the triangle as originally proposed and an inner chord to create sufficient space in which to safely turn trains before the junction with the main line. Visiting BR Standard Class 7 70000 Britannia was the first locomotive to officially be turned on the Norton Fitzwarren triangle during the Spring Steam Gala in March 2012.

== Operation ==
A service of four trains each way Monday to Saturday was advertised when the railway first opened to Watchet, but this fluctuated to five or six at times for many years. A very limited Sunday service was introduced in 1862 but was withdrawn in 1869.

An engine shed was provided at originally Watchet so that trains could start from that end of the line. This was moved to Minehead when the line was extended to there, but the frequency of services remained much the same. With the improvements to the line in the early years of the century, the frequency increased to eight trains daily by 1910 and to 14 before World War II. Sunday services resumed in 1926 for the first time in over 50 years. The engine shed was closed in 1956 after which time all trains were provided from the Taunton end and the timetable was cut back to ten round trips. Diesels started to appear regularly from 1962, both locomotive-hauled trains and diesel multiple units (DMUs).

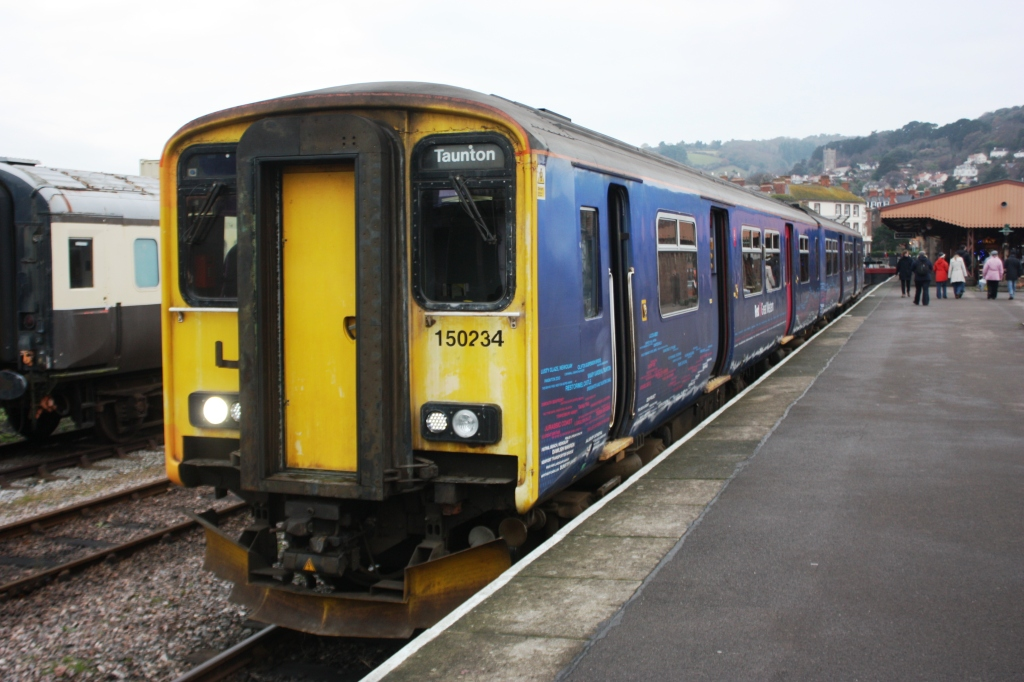
A Class 150 visits with a special service from the main line

As of 2009, regular services operate between Minehead and Bishops Lydeard. The operating season runs from March to October, with infrequent operations from November through to February. Trains run daily during the summer but less frequently during the remainder of the season. Four regular timetables are run on different days depending on expected demand, varying from two to four trains in operation, each of which makes two round trips which gives between four and eight services each way. From February 2009 to January 2010, services were advertised on 243 days. Operating locomotives are based at Minehead and Bishops Lydeard and a spare is generally kept ready at Williton.

During special events, an intensive service is operated and some workings continue through to Norton Fitzwarren. A few railtours each year come through from Network Rail using the connection near Taunton.

The heritage railway also carries some freight traffic from time to time. At one time this was carrying stone for Minehead sea defences, in conjunction with Mendip Rail. In more recent years it has seen Freightliner-hauled Network Rail trains discharge old ballast at Norton Fitzwarren for recycling.

=== Signalling ===
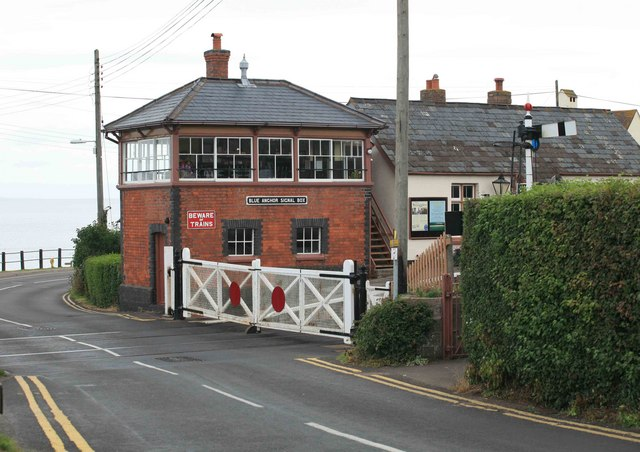
The signal box and road crossing at Blue Anchor, looking downhill towards the Bristol Channel

The railway is separated into five nominal block sections:

- Network Rail boundary at Norton Fitzwarren (milepost 1651/4) to Bishops Lydeard: One Train Working (OTW). A "No Signalman" Electric Key Token (EKT) system is used on this section. The token is sent by car to Taunton when through trains operate from Network Rail. There are no intermediate loops, but three ground frame operated points to allow access and turning on the Norton Triangle.
- Bishops Lydeard to Crowcombe Heathfield: both stations have passing loops controlled by signal boxes. This section is controlled by an EKT system, as is the rest of the line. Crowcombe Heathfield signal box can be switched-out, creating a double section with the next block, with control then via a long section EKT system.
- Crowcombe Heathfield to Williton: both stations have passing loops controlled by signal boxes, with the block controlled by EKT.
- Williton to Blue Anchor: both stations have passing loops controlled by signal boxes, with the block controlled by EKT.
- Blue Anchor to Minehead: both stations have loops or facilities controlled by signal boxes. This section uses Electric Key Token (EKT) control and was the first section to be completed with working EKT.

Communication between signal boxes for block working is by a block bell system with a series of bell codes, with additional phone lines for more in depth conversation to take place.

The signal boxes use two types of frame, both manufactured at the GWR signal works in Reading. The older frames are the 1892 developed Stud frame, which replaced the original twist frames. It operates in a similar manner to tappet locking except that the blades are curved. The remained signal boxes use 5-bar tappet locking frames dating from the 1930s. Power supply within the boxes is standard 110-volt AC, 50 Hz, derived via transformer from the standard UK/EU 230-volts AC individual supplies. Inside the box, most voltages are DC, with standards derived from those in operations during British Railways ownership of the line.

Isolated level crossings are fed direct from mains supply, but use a locally derived railway standard 24-volts DC.

"Switching Out" Crowcombe Heathfield

Crowcombe Heathfield Signal Box can be "switched out". When done, this reduces the number of block sections on the railway to 4. Switching out is a procedure conducted by the signallers at Bishops Lydeard, Crowcombe Heathfield and Williton. Once complete, bell codes are transmitted between Bishops Lydeard and Williton using separate block bell instruments in their respective signalboxes for the long section, and thus a different, long section token is used for the full line between Bishops Lydeard and Williton. No signalman is required at Crowcombe Heathfield when the box is switched out.

When switched out, the points are set and locked for the main platform (Down Platform) and all signals for said platform are cleared in both directions, transforming Crowcombe Heathfield into a single platform station. The route and signals cannot be changed until the box is switched back in.

=== Rolling stock ===
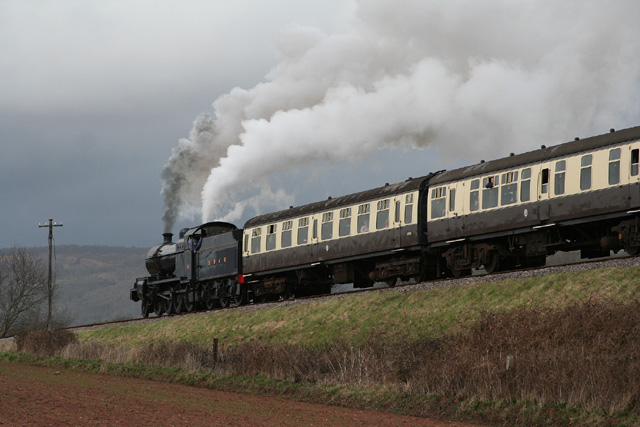
88 with a train of Mark I coaches

Photographs of the line when operated by the Bristol and Exeter Railway show that their 4-4-0ST locomotives were the regular motive power. Later years saw types such as GWR 4500, 4575, and 5101 'prairie' 2-6-2Ts, 2251 'Collett goods' 0-6-0s, 5700 'pannier tank' 0-6-0PTs and 4300 'mogul' 2-6-0s. In British Railways' time, these were replaced by Western Region NBL Type 2, Hymek Type 3 diesel-hydraulic locomotives, Swindon and Gloucester cross-country diesel multiple units (DMUs).

Today, the line is operated by a variety of preserved steam and diesel locomotives and DMUs. Most of these are typical of GWR branch lines in Somerset or of the Somerset and Dorset Joint Railway (SDJR). Among the types based on the railway are examples of GWR 4575 and 5100 class 2-6-2Ts and a Somerset and Dorset Joint Railway 7F Class 2-8-0. A unique experiment has been to convert a GWR 5101 Class 2-6-2T into a small 2-6-0 numbered 9351. Diesels include Hymek and Western diesel-hydraulics.

Most trains are formed from British Rail Mark 1 coaches painted in a chocolate and cream livery, based on the most familiar one used by the GWR but with WSR crests. The WSRA owned and operated Quantock Belle fine dining train is also formed from BR Mark 1 coaches, but each is painted in a livery reminiscent of Pullman cars and also named. There are also a number of freight wagons, some of which are used for engineering purposes or in a demonstration heritage freight train that is used on special occasions.

== Films and television ==
Several films and television programmes have been shot on the railway:

- A Hard Day's Night (1964) featured The Beatles and was filmed in 1964 at London Marylebone station and on the Minehead branch, much of it in and around Crowcombe.
- The Belstone Fox (1973), a children's film, partly shot along the line near Crowcombe (village), chronicling the life of a fox much smarter than the dogs that hunt him.
- The Flockton Flyer (1977–78) was a children's television drama series about a preserved railway that was filmed on the West Somerset Railway shortly after it reopened.
- The Lion, the Witch and the Wardrobe (1988), a BBC television mini-series was filmed at Crowcombe Heathfield.
- The Land Girls (1997) was filmed on the railway and Crowcombe Heathfield featured as Bamford station.
- Casualty (2013) the BBC One medical-based soap opera has used the line since shooting its first scenes in December 2013.
- Agatha Christie's Seven Dials (2026) a Netflix TV series included scenes of a train at Blue Anchor.

== Heritage organisations ==
Although the railway is operated by the West Somerset Railway Company (WSR plc) based at Minehead, it is supported by a number of voluntary and charitable organisations.

The West Somerset Railway Association (WSRA) was formed alongside the WSR plc in 1971, to reopen the line. Based at Bishops Lydeard, it is a major shareholder of the plc. It has workshops at Williton and owns two locomotives (4500 Class 4561 and Manor Class No.7821 Ditcheat Manor) and shares in others. It also owns the Quantock Belle dining train and Hawksworth Saloon which operate on the line.

The West Somerset Railway Heritage Trust (WSRHT) (until 2021 named the West Somerset Steam Railway Trust) was set up in 1972 to operate the summer steam trains alongside the West Somerset Railway plc's commuter service. It had little to do once the railway became a purely seasonal heritage line but, in 1984 to coincide with the GW150 celebrations, was revived for education and historical research into the Minehead branch, and now has a small museum at Blue Anchor. The Trust's restored GWR sleeping carriage is on display in the Gauge Museum at Bishops Lydeard, and the Trust is presently restoring a GWR 'Toplight' coach which will be the first in a set of historic coaches on the West Somerset Railway. The Trust is administered by five voluntary directors. In early 2007, the Trust embarked on a project to restore two rakes of GWR coaches for use on the West Somerset Railway. Some of these were already on the railway, but others will be brought from abroad. The first of these, No 6705, was acquired from Steamtown USA. It returned to England, and after initial works at Crewe, is now at Williton for completion.

The Diesel and Electric Preservation Group (DEPG) is based at Williton, where they use the old goods shed and a newer building as workshops for their fleet of five ex-Western Region diesel locomotives: Class 14 9526; Class 35s 7017 and 7018; Class 47 1661; and Class 52 1010. Williton is also the base for a number of privately owned locomotives which are maintained by the DEPG.

=== Former heritage organisations ===
The Somerset and Dorset Railway Trust (S&DRT) was formerly based at Washford, and promotes the education and preservation of the Somerset and Dorset Joint Railway. It owns S&DJR 7F 2-8-0 number 88, which was part of the WSR's regular operational fleet during their tenure. While Washford was under their custodianship, the Trust developed a workshop and yard, where they restored a number of former S&DJR goods wagons and coaches, as well as "Kilmersdon", a Peckett 0-4-0ST locomotive. The associated museum featured a signalling display based around the small signal box from Burnham-on-Sea. In 2020 the Trust's agreement with the WSR was terminated and slowly the Trust's collection has been relocated to various sites including the Watercress Line and the Avon Valley Railway.
