= Bishops Lydeard railway station =

Heritage railway station in Somerset, England

Bishops Lydeard
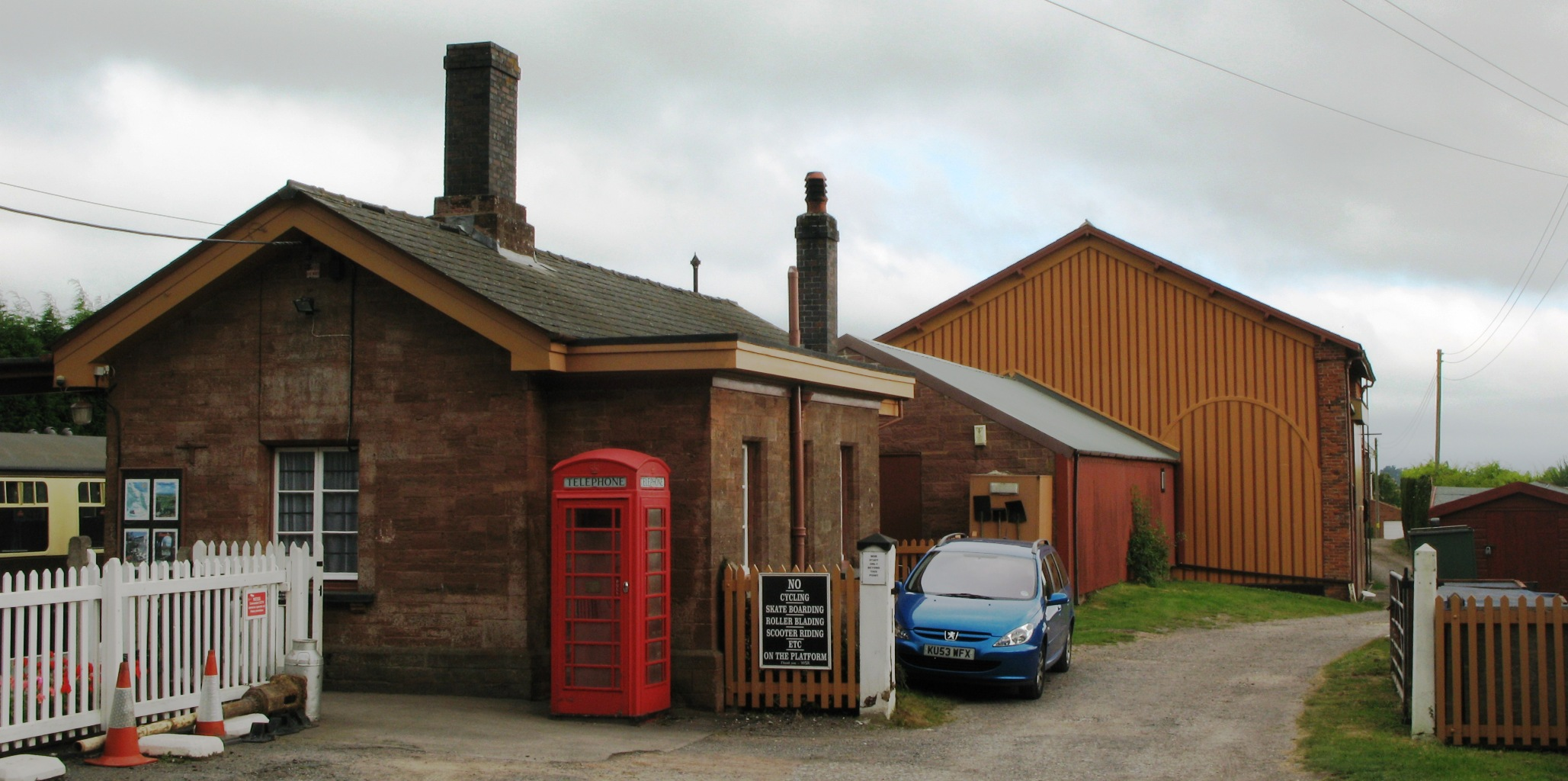

General information
- Location: Bishops Lydeard, Somerset; England
- Coordinates: 51.0541°N 3.1942°W
- Grid reference: ST163290
- System: Station on heritage railway
- Operator: West Somerset Railway
- Platforms: 2

History
- Original company: West Somerset Railway
- Post-grouping: Great Western Railway

Key dates
- 1862: Opened
- 1971: Closed
- 1979: Reopened
Location

Bishops Lydeard railway station is a heritage railway station in the village of Bishops Lydeard, Somerset, England. It is the southern terminus for regular trains on the West Somerset Railway.

== History ==
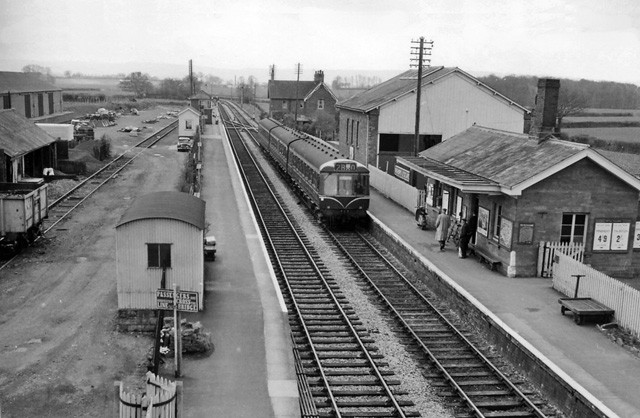
View towards Norton Fitzwarren in 1963

=== B&ER/GWR ===
The station was first opened on 31 March 1862 when the West Somerset Railway was opened from Norton Junction to Watchet, operated by the Bristol and Exeter Railway (B&ER). On opening the station had just one platform on the line's west side, with goods facilities consisting of a siding to a goods shed on the west, and a passing loop plus two sidings on the northeast was served by a passing loop and two sidings. There was also a house for the station master.

The B&ER became part of the Great Western Railway in 1876, but the West Somerset Railway remained an independent company until 1922 when the Great Western absorbed it.

The second eastern platform was not added until 1906, together with a connecting footbridge. The standard-pattern GWR medium-scale signal box was also added at the end of the platform, operated via a 25-lever stud-locking frame. On 10 June 1936 the line was doubled from here to Norton Fitzwarren, resulting in the signal box being upgraded to a 32-lever frame.

=== British Railways ===
Nationalisation in 1948 saw it become a part of the Western Region of British Railways. On 1 March 1970 the signal box was closed and its frame removed, and the track from Norton Fitzwarren through Bishop’s Lydeard and as far as Williton was operated as a single track. The station was closed by BR, along with the entire line, on 4 January 1971.

=== West Somerset Railway ===
After the entire line and its trackbed were bought by Somerset County Council, the West Somerset Railway agreed to lease the line as a heritage railway, with the later possibility of operating timetabled service trains into Taunton via operating company, the WSR plc. Track remains to Norton Fitzwarren, controlled through a single token and colour light signals, to allow special trains and occasional goods trains to operate through from Network Rail to the WSR.

The WSR revived the line from its western end, starting at Minehead and operating to Stogumber, before extending operations through to Bishops Lydeard on 9 June 1979. Initially the section west of Williton was operated as one-train-only, before the WSR began operating Bishops Lydeard as a terminus. After the society secured a new 33-lever frame in 1981, following extensive fund-raising, the station's loop was extended to its current length of 275 yards (251 m), to allow for dual-platform arrival/departures. HM Railway Inspectorate approved the new plans in 1997, and the full system, including control of the Norton Fitzwarren section, came into use from August 1998.

== Description ==
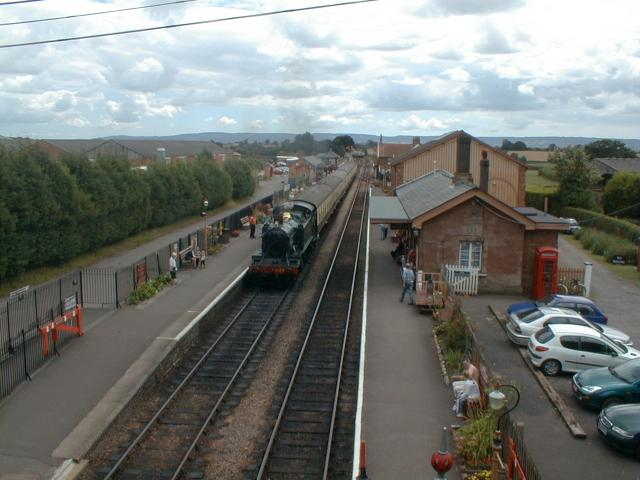
View from the north end

Today the station has two operational platforms and is the headquarters of the West Somerset Railway Association.

The original No.1 platform, on the western side of the station, was extended yet further towards Taunton by the WSR to allow for dual-platform departure. The old goods shed has been restored and is used as a visitor centre and museum called the Gauge Museum, run by the West Somerset Railway Heritage Trust, its artefacts include a GWR sleeping car and the Trust's model railway layout. An adjacent building on the platform is home to the Taunton Model Railway Group’s model railway layout. The original station offices with modern toilets are now used by the West Somerset Railway Association.

The eastern-side 1906-built platform, No.2, is today the station's main operating platform. Accessed via a carpark to its rear, it contains the ticket office, toilets, shop and café, and the now enclosed signal box, with a platform extension towards Taunton that has made it considerably longer than platform 1. This extension provided for the inclusion of the Taunton-facing platform No.3, but this is only operated as a siding as movements onto the running lines are not direct; it is normally used to house the "Quantock Belle" dining cars.

The West Somerset Railway's southern locomotive stabling yard is also based here (southeast of platform 2, and not accessible to the public), which is where visiting locomotives arriving by road are unloaded onto the WSR.

== Services ==
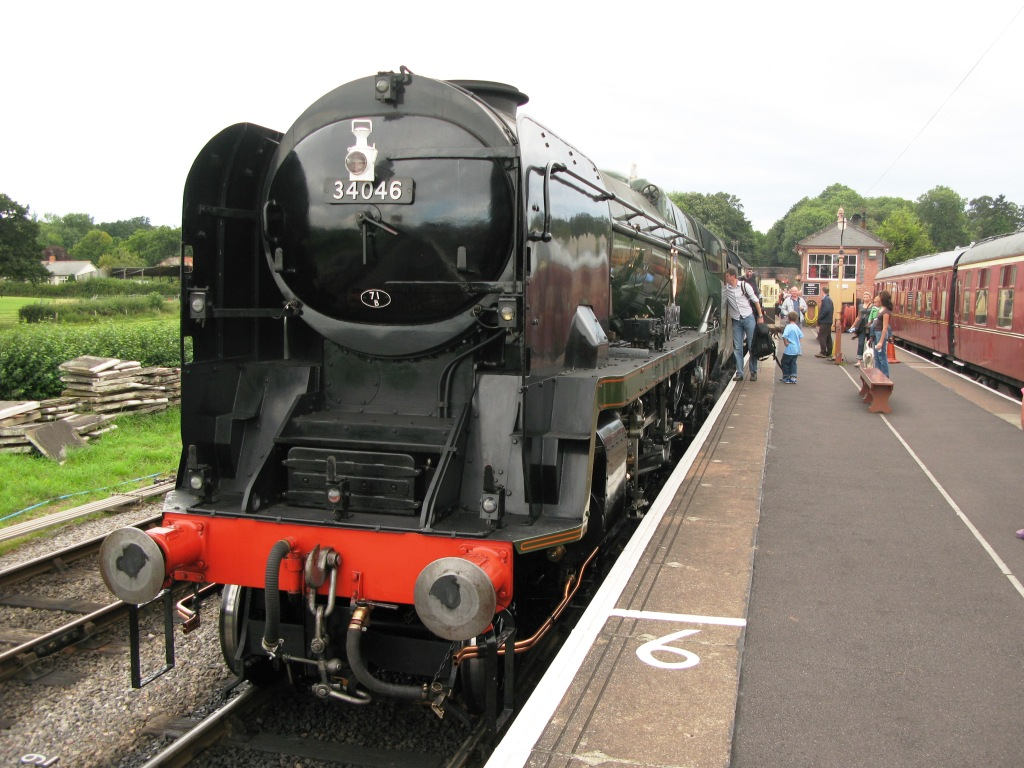
Braunton arrives with a train from Minehead

Trains run between Minehead and Bishops Lydeard at weekends and on some other days from March to October, daily during the late spring and summer, and on certain days during the winter. During special events a shuttle service runs between Bishops Lydeard and Norton Fitzwarren and from time to time special trains also run through onto Network Rail's tracks at Taunton.

In 2019, the WSR entered into a partnership with the modern Great Western Railway (GWR) to operate services to Bishops Lydeard on occasional summer Saturdays from Taunton beginning on 27 July 2019 which ended on October 5, 2019. In May 2022 it was announced that the "Reconnecting Bishops Lydeard to Taunton Working Group" has been established to explore the possibility of reconnecting Bishops Lydeard on the West Somerset Railway to Taunton for the purpose of reinstating scheduled trains.

Preceding station	Heritage railways	Following station
Crowcombe Heathfield towards Minehead	West Somerset Railway	Terminus
Crowcombe Heathfield towards Minehead	West Somerset Railway Special events only	Norton Fitzwarren towards Taunton
Preceding station	National Rail	Following station
Terminus	Great Western Railway; Special events only	Norton Fitzwarren

== Access ==
For those outside the area, Bishops Lydeard is the WSR main access point:

- Train: the nearest national rail station is Taunton, served by Great Western Railway and CrossCountry trains.
- Bus: 28 service from Taunton town centre and railway station serves Bishops Lydeard station directly.
- Car: Sign posted from junctions 25 or 26 of the M5 motorway, the station is located just off the A358 road on the opposite side to the village. There is a large free car park adjacent to station platform 2.
