= Minehead railway station =

Heritage railway station in Somerset, England

Minehead
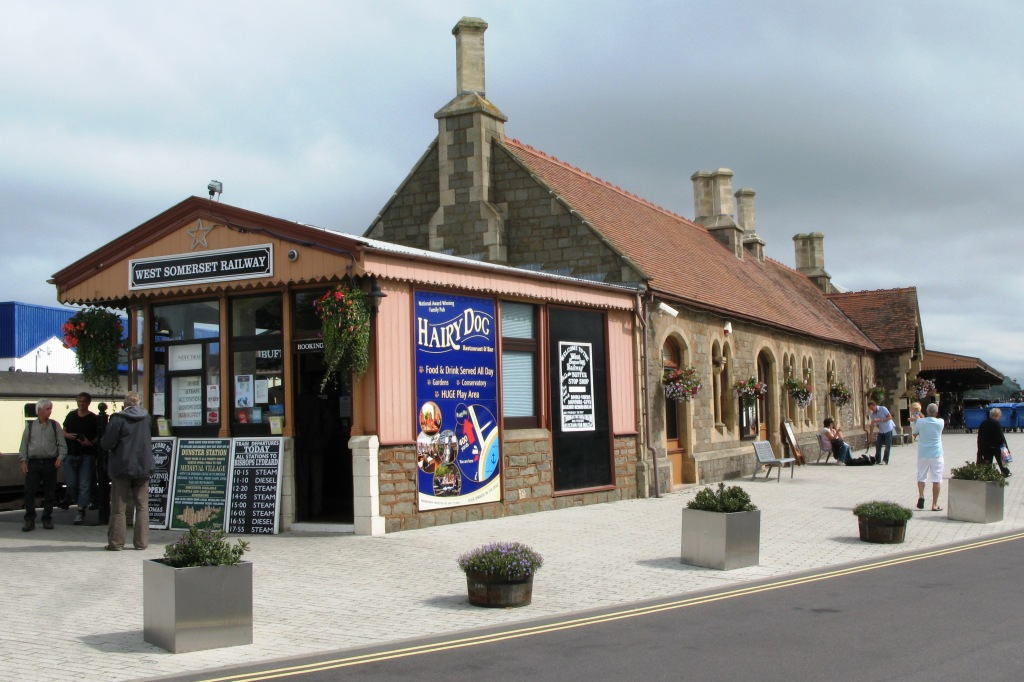

General information
- Location: Minehead, Somerset; England
- Coordinates: 51.2061°N 3.4668°W
- Grid reference: SS974463
- System: Station on heritage railway
- Operator: West Somerset Railway
- Platforms: 2

History
- Original company: Minehead Railway
- Pre-grouping: Great Western Railway
- Post-grouping: Great Western Railway

Key dates
- 16 July 1874: Opened
- 4 January 1971: Closed
- 28 March 1976: Opened in preservation
Location

Minehead railway station is situated in Minehead, Somerset, England. First opened in 1874 as the terminus and headquarters of the Minehead Railway, it was closed by British Rail early in 1971. It reopened in 1976 and is now the terminus and headquarters of the West Somerset Railway, a heritage railway.

== History ==
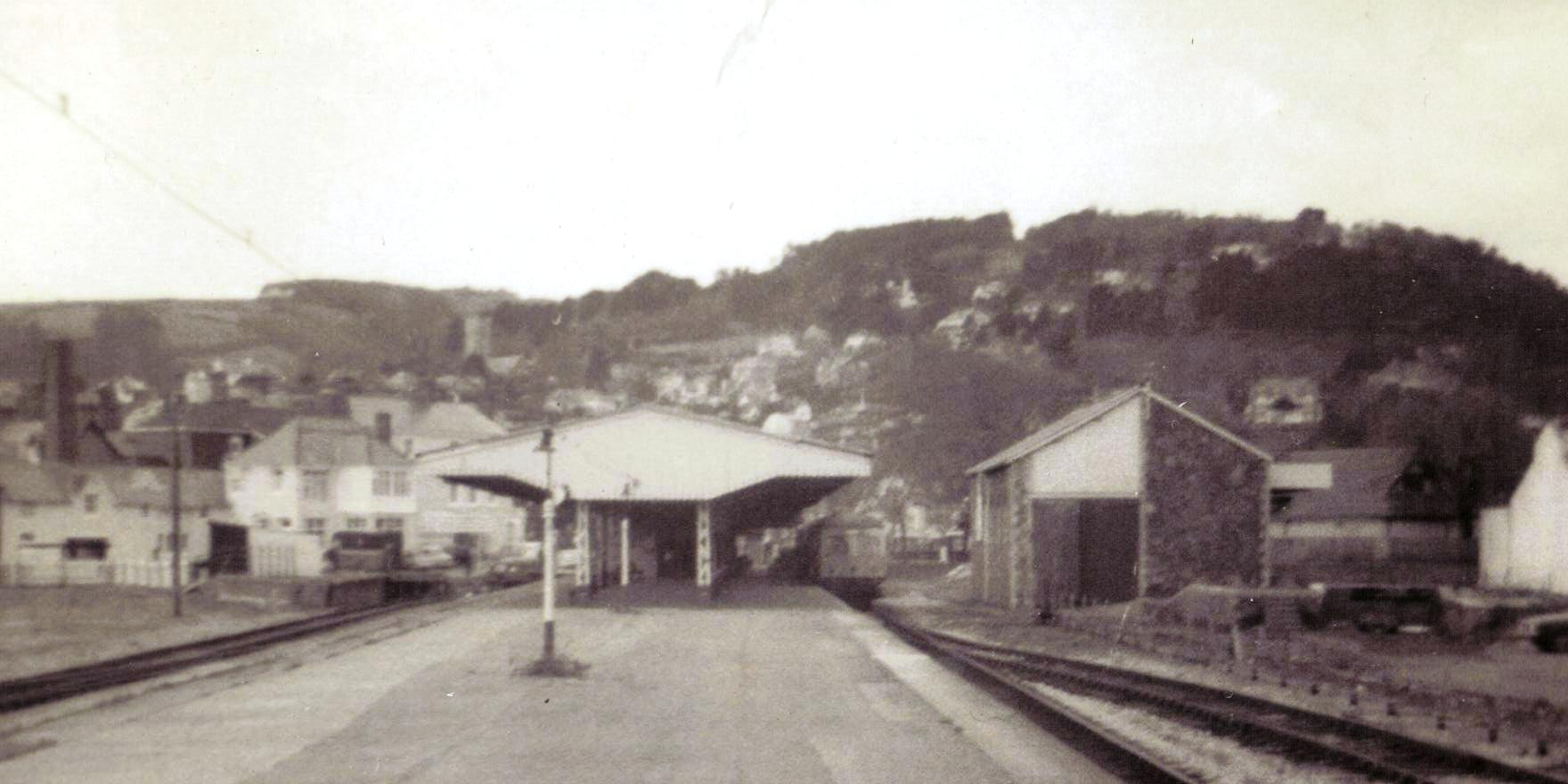
Looking westwards in 1970

The station was opened on 16 July 1874 by the Minehead Railway. The railway was operated by the Bristol and Exeter Railway which was amalgamated into the Great Western Railway in 1876. The Minehead Railway was itself absorbed into the GWR in 1897, which in turn was nationalised into British Railways in 1948.

The station was originally built with just one platform. The station offices were on the platform and a goods shed was opposite, while an engine shed was provided behind the platform. In 1905 a second track was added on the opposite side of the platform and a new signal box was brought into use. An iron hut was added to provide more accommodation but was removed in the 1920s when the main building was extended towards the town. The next major alterations came in 1934 when the original single track line was replaced by a double line to cope with the heavy holiday traffic, and a new signal box built. The platforms were extended at the same time. They were now 1,250 feet (380 m) long and a 200 feet (61 m) canopy was provided to give extra shelter at the town end.

The engine shed was closed in 1956, goods traffic ceased in 1964, and the signal box became redundant on 27 March 1966. The railway was closed on 4 January 1971.

=== Preservation ===
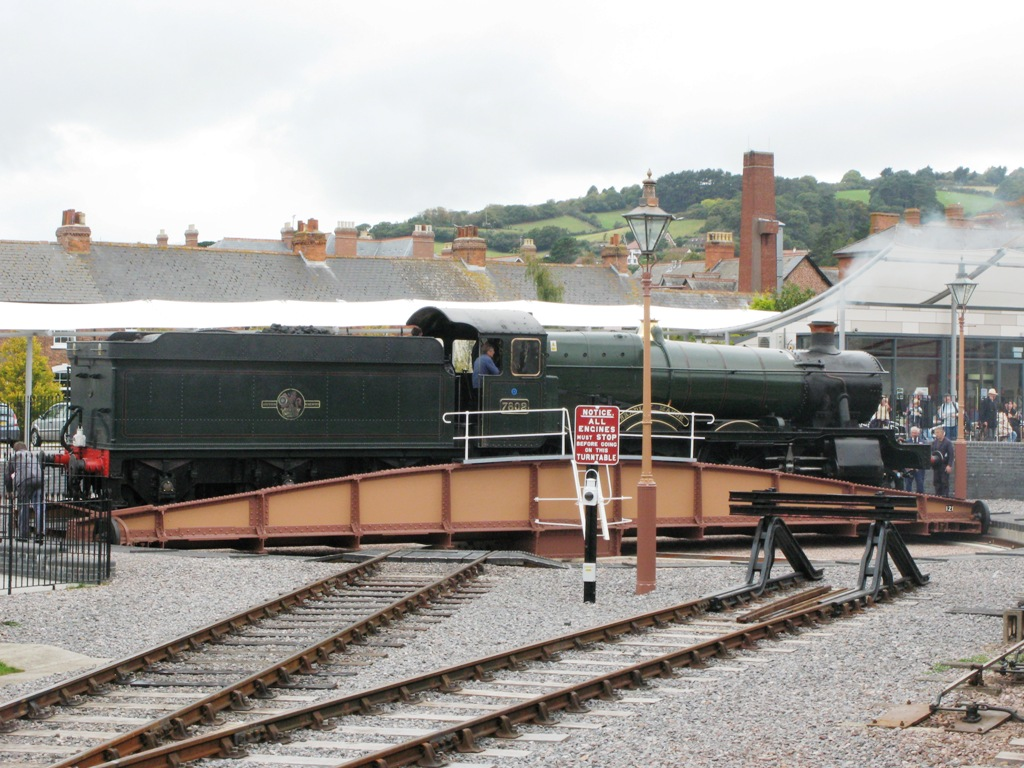
Bradley Manor on the new turntable

The station reopened on 28 March 1976 as a heritage railway by a new West Somerset Railway. The goods shed was converted into an engine shed and extended in 1999. Meanwhile, the station building was altered to be used as offices, and a new ticket office provided. A new level crossing has been laid across the line a little beyond the platform end to carry a new relief road to the sea front, and the former Dunster signal box was moved to control trains at Minehead. A new carriage workshop was opened in 1991 near the Dunster end of the station,

The original turntable was removed from the station in 1967, after steam trains and GWR Autocoach services were completely replaced by Diesel Multiple Units. The WSR acquired both the 55 feet (17 m) turntable and water tower from Pwllheli railway station in anticipation of reinstalling a facility at the station, but later sold the water tower to the Welshpool and Llanfair Railway in 1999. In 2007, the company agreed plans for a £6M development with Somerset Council, to provide a new site for the turntable, together with a viewing area, extended car parking and some ancillary buildings. The turntable was extended using genuine-GWR engineering pattern drawings to 65 feet (20 m), and then installed at its new location, brought into use in May 2008.

The station currently serves as the headquarters of the West Somerset Railway, as well as the base for the: Operating; Mechanical Engineering; Civil Engineering; Signal & Telegraph; and Administration departments.

== Description ==
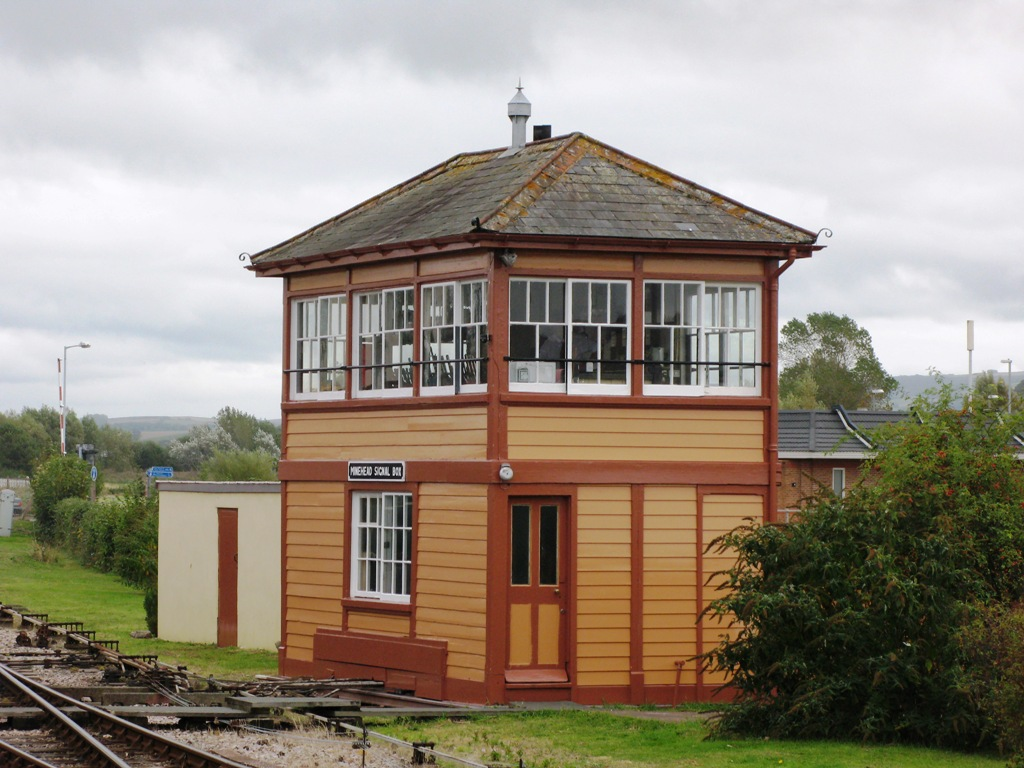
The signal box

The station is on the sea front and close to the town centre. A wide, single platform has tracks on both sides. The main track on the seaward side is platform 1, while platform 2 stops short of the stone-built station buildings. The old goods shed is opposite the station building and is now used as a locomotive workshop, and a newer carriage workshop is close by. Opposite platform 2 is the turntable, overlooked by a cafe operated by the railway. The buildings on the platform include a booking office and a shop selling souvenirs.

The signal box is at the far end of the platform near the level crossing. Sidings on both sides of the station are used to hold stock, both operating vehicles and others awaiting repairs in the workshops.

The station is a Grade II listed building.

== Services ==
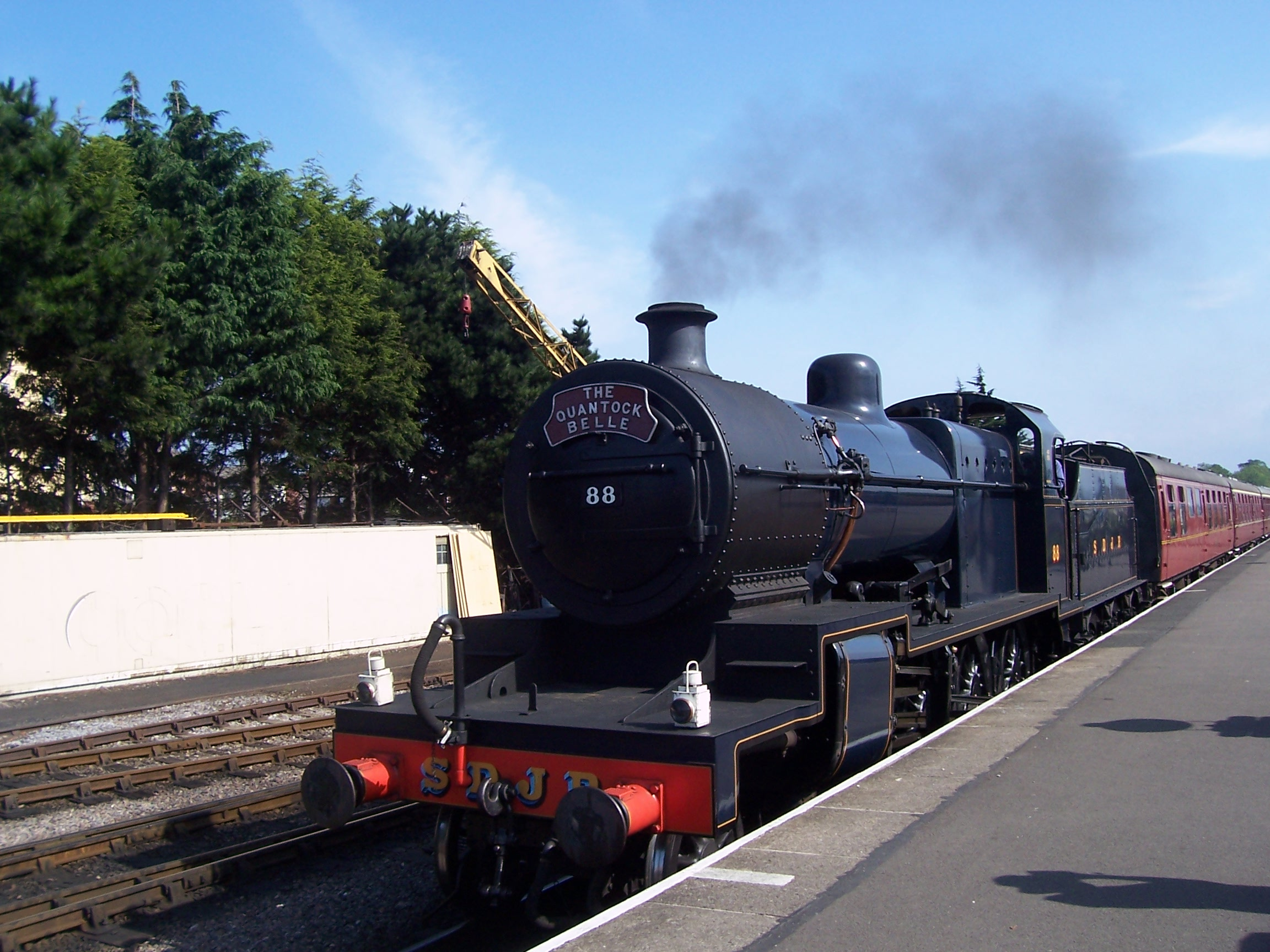
SD&JR 88 arrives at Minehead

Trains run between Minehead and Bishops Lydeard at weekends and on some other days from March to October, daily during the late spring and summer, and on certain days during the winter.

Occasional charter services, either steam or diesel hauled, run through from the National Rail network.

Preceding station	Heritage railways	Following station
Terminus	West Somerset Railway	Dunster towards Bishops Lydeard
