= List of GWR 7800 Class locomotives =

List of all GWR Manor Class locomotives, built between 1938 and 1950.

Number	Name	Built	Withdrawn	Scrapped at	Notes
7800	Torquay Manor	January 1938	August 1964	Cashmore's, Great Bridge	Originally to be called Ashley Manor. Conducted improved draughting tests, February 1954
7801	Anthony Manor	January 1938	July 1965	Bird's, Swansea	
7802	Bradley Manor	January 1938	November 1965		Preserved at the Severn Valley Railway
7803	Barcote Manor	January 1938	April 1965	Bird's, Bridgend	Conducted improved draughting tests, February 1954
7804	Baydon Manor	February 1938	September 1965	Cashmore's, Newport	
7805	Broome Manor	March 1938	December 1964	Cashmore's, Great Bridge	
7806	Cockington Manor	March 1938	November 1964	Cashmore's, Great Bridge	
7807	Compton Manor	March 1938	November 1964	Cashmore's, Great Bridge	
7808	Cookham Manor	March 1938	November 1965		Preserved at Didcot Railway Centre
7809	Childrey Manor	April 1938	April 1963	Swindon Works	Conducted improved draughting tests, February 1954
7810	Draycott Manor	December 1938	September 1964	Bird's, Swansea	
7811	Dunley Manor	December 1938	July 1965	Bird's, Swansea	Nameplates were sold for £3,450 in September 1988 at Sheffield Railway Auctions.
7812	Erlestoke Manor	January 1939	November 1965		Preserved at the Severn Valley Railway
7813	Freshford Manor	January 1939	May 1965	Bird's, Swansea	
7814	Fringford Manor	January 1939	September 1965	Bird's, Long Marston	
7815	Fritwell Manor	January 1939	October 1964	Bird's, Bridgend	
7816	Frilsham Manor	January 1939	October 1965	Cashmore's, Newport	
7817	Garsington Manor	January 1939	June 1964	Bird's, Newport	
7818	Granville Manor	January 1939	January 1965	Cashmore's, Great Bridge	
7819	Hinton Manor	February 1939	November 1965		Preserved at the Severn Valley Railway
7820	Dinmore Manor	November 1950	November 1965		Preserved at Gloucestershire and Warwickshire Railway
7821	Ditcheat Manor	November 1950	November 1965		Preserved at West Somerset Railway
7822	Foxcote Manor	December 1950	December 1965		Preserved at Llangollen Railway
7823	Hook Norton Manor	December 1950	July 1964	Cashmore's, Great Bridge	Conducted improved draughting tests February 1954
7824	Iford Manor	December 1950	November 1964	Cashmore's, Great Bridge	Conducted improved draughting tests February 1954
7825	Lechlade Manor	December 1950	May 1964	Bird's, Newport	
7826	Longworth Manor	December 1950	April 1965	Bird's, Llanelli	
7827	Lydham Manor	December 1950	October 1965		Preserved at Paignton and Dartmouth Steam Railway
7828	Odney Manor	December 1950	October 1965		Preserved at West Somerset Railway
7829	Ramsbury Manor	December 1950	December 1965	Cashmore's, Newport	Conducted improved draughting tests February 1954. Nameplates were sold for £7,550 in September 1995 at Sheffield Railway Auctions.
