= List of rolling stock preserved on the Severn Valley Railway =

The rolling stock preserved on the Severn Valley Railway is used to operate trains on the Severn Valley Railway (SVR), a heritage railway in Shropshire and Worcestershire, England. There is a variety of preserved steam and diesel locomotives, diesel multiple units, passenger coaches, and goods wagons. Most of these are typical of Great Western Railway (GWR) or London Midland and Scottish Railway (LMS) branch lines. Some are owned by the railway itself but most are owned by various individuals or voluntary groups.

The line is also regularly visited by locomotives based elsewhere. Some come for a day on a railtour, others for a few days or weeks to take part in a special gala, for test running, or on short term hire. These visitors are not included in this article.

== Rolling stock summary ==
The railway can call on a large fleet to operate its services. Only a small 'core' group of vehicles actually belong to the railway company itself; the remainder are owned by an associated groups, such as the Great Western (Severn Valley Railway) Association, or individuals. The SVR is also the base of the DMU Group (West Midlands), which focuses on DMU preservation. Locomotives and vehicles from the railway are now only infrequently used on excursions on the National Rail network, but in the past have operated across Great Britain.

== Steam locomotives ==
=== Operational steam locomotives ===
Number & name	Type	Builder	Photograph	Livery	Notes
Port Talbot Railway 26 (GWR No. 813)	Port Talbot Railway 0-6-0ST	Hudswell Clarke		GWR Unlined Green, Great Western lettering	Built in 1900. The oldest locomotive in operation on the SVR.
1450	GWR 1400 Class 0-4-2T	Swindon Works		BR Lined Green, early crest	Built in 1935. Returned to service in January 2025.
4150	GWR 5101 Class 2-6-2T	Swindon Works		N/A (awaiting final painting)	Built in 1947. Returned to steam in June 2026, the 154th ex-Barry locomotive to be restored.
4930 Hagley Hall	GWR 49xx "Hall" Class 4-6-0	Swindon Works		GWR Lined Green, shirtbutton crest	Built in 1929. Returned to service in 2022.
7714	GWR 57xx Class 0-6-0PT	Kerr, Stuart and Company		BR Unlined Black, early crest	Built in 1930. Returned to service in December 2016.
7802 Bradley Manor	GWR 7800 "Manor" Class 4-6-0	Swindon Works		BR Lined Green, late crest	Built in 1938. Returned to service in January 2025.
7812 Erlestoke Manor	GWR 78xx "Manor" Class 4-6-0	Swindon Works		BR Lined Green, late crest	Built in 1939. Returned to service in December 2022. On hire to the West Somerset Railway until the end of the 2027 season.
13268	LMS Stanier Mogul 2-6-0	Crewe Works		LMS Lined Black	Built in 1934. Returned to service in late 2023.
75069	BR Standard Class 4 4-6-0	Swindon Works		BR Lined Black, late crest	Built in 1955. Returned to service in 2019.

=== Steam locomotives under overhaul, repair or restoration ===
Number & name	Type	Builder	Photograph	Livery	Notes
2857	GWR 2800 Class 2-8-0	Swindon Works		GWR Unlined Green, GWR lettering	Built in 1918. Last worked in January 2023. Contract for overhaul signed in 2025.
34027 Taw Valley	SR West Country Class 4-6-2	Brighton Works		BR Lined Green (on completion)	Built in 1946. Air-brake fitted but no longer mainline certified. Withdrawn for intermediate overhaul and repaint in May 2024.
2047 Warwickshire	Manning Wardle 0-6-0ST	Manning Wardle		N/A	Built in 1926 for Rugby Portland Cement; the last steam locomotive built by Manning Wardle. Last worked in 1977. Under overhaul at Bewdley.
4085 Dunrobin	Sharp, Stewart 0-4-4T	Sharp, Stewart and Company		N/A	Built in 1895. Arrived in 2011 for a contract overhaul.

=== Steam locomotives stored awaiting overhaul ===
Number & name	Type	Builder	Photograph	Livery	Notes
1501	GWR 1500 Class 0-6-0PT	Swindon Works		BR Lined Black, early emblem	Built in 1949, preserved on the SVR in 1970. Stored awaiting overhaul. Last worked in January 2023.
5164	GWR 5101 Class 2-6-2T	Swindon Works		GWR Green with Great Western lettering.	Built in 1930. From 2014 following withdrawal from service the engine was stored on static display at Barrow Hill Roundhouse. The engine was moved from Barrow Hill Roundhouse to Tyseley Locomotive Works for assessment in November 2023.
7325	GWR 4300 Class 2-6-0	Swindon Works		BR Green, late crest	Built in 1932 as number 9303; renumbered 7325 in 1958. Stored at Kidderminster awaiting overhaul. Last worked in 2000.
43106	LMS Ivatt Class 4 2-6-0	Darlington Works		BR Lined Black, late crest	Built in 1951. Unofficially known as "The Flying Pig". Last worked in January 2024.
47383	LMS Fowler Class 3F 0-6-0T	Vulcan Foundry		BR Unlined Black, early emblem	Built in 1926. Last worked in 2002. Stored at Kidderminster.

=== Steam locomotives under construction ===
Number & name	Type	Builder	Image	Livery	Notes
82045	BR Standard Class 3 2-6-2T	The 82045 Steam Locomotive Trust		BR Lined Green (on completion)	New-build example, numbered as an extension of the original class. Being built at SVR's Bridgnorth Locomotive Works.
Catch Me Who Can	Richard Trevithick 0-2-2	Trevithick 200			Reconstruction of Trevithick's original Bridgnorth built engine of 1808, being built at SVR's Bridgnorth Locomotive Works. On loan to Bury Transport Museum, East Lancashire Railway, from Sept 2025

=== Steam locomotives on static display ===
Number & name	Type	Builder	Photograph	Livery	Notes
686 The Lady Armaghdale (No. 14 St John)	Hunslet Engine Company 0-6-0T	Hunslet Engine Company		Red	Built in 1898 for the Manchester Ship Canal as No. 14 St. John. Sold to ICI Dyestuffs, Blackley, in 1963 and renamed "The Lady Armaghdale". Last worked in 2009. On display in the Engine House.
600 Gordon	WD Austerity 2-10-0	North British Locomotive Company		LMR Blue	Built in 1943 and used on the Longmoor Military Railway. Last worked in 1999, formally handed over to the SVR by the British Army in July 2008.
4566	GWR 4500 Class 2-6-2T	Swindon Works		BR Unlined Black, early emblem	Built in 1924. Last worked in January 2017.
5764 (L95)	GWR 5700 Class 0-6-0PT	Swindon Works		London Transport	Built in 1929. Sold to London Transport in May 1960 and renumbered L95; withdrawn in June 1971. Last worked in 2011.
7819 Hinton Manor	GWR 7800 "Manor" Class 4-6-0	Swindon Works		GWR Green, "shirtbutton" logo	Built in 1939. Owned by the Severn Valley Railway Charitable Trust. Last worked in 1995. On loan for display at the Vale of Rheidol Railway museum for two years from March 2026, in exchange for 'Dukedog' 9017 Earl of Berkeley.
46443	LMS Ivatt Class 2 2-6-0	Crewe Works		BR Black, Late Crest	Built in 1950. Last worked in 2011. An Appeal to raise funds for an overhaul is shortly due to commence.
48773	LMS Stanier 8F 2-8-0	North British Locomotive Company		BR Black, late crest with stripe across cab.	Built in 1940, last worked in 2008.
80079	BR Standard Class 4 2-6-4T	Brighton Works		BR Black, late crest	Built in 1954. Involved in the Dagenham East rail crash in 1958. Last worked in 2002. On static display at Barrow Hill Roundhouse since December 2024.
9017 Earl of Berkeley	GWR 3200 Class	Swindon Works			Rebuilt 1938, utilising the frames of "Bulldog" Class 4-4-0 3245, and the boiler from Duke Class 3282.

== Diesel locomotives ==
=== Mainline Diesel locomotives ===
Number & name	Type	Builder	Photograph	Livery	Status	Notes
D9551	BR Class 14 0-6-0	Swindon Works		BR Green	Operational	Operational, based at Bridgnorth.
33108	BR Class 33 Bo-Bo	Birmingham C&WW		BR Civil Engineers' grey/yellow	Operational	Operational based at Highley (31466 covered its role whilst it went in for overhaul.)
D7029	BR Class 35 B-B	Beyer Peacock		BR Blue	Restoration	Undergoing restoration at Kidderminster.
37308	BR Class 37 Co-Co	Vulcan Foundry			Stored	Stored awaiting overhaul.
D821 Greyhound	BR Class 42 B-B	Swindon Works		BR Blue	Operational	Made first appearance at the 2023 diesel bash with loco 33108 making its first appearance at the event as well.
50007 Hercules	BR Class 50 Co-Co	Vulcan Foundry		GBRf	Operational	Based at Kidderminster, mainline certified.
50031 Hood	BR Class 50 Co-Co	Vulcan Foundry		BR InterCity	Overhaul	Under repair at Kidderminster.
50033 Glorious	BR Class 50 Co-Co	Vulcan Foundry		BR Large Logo	Operational	Based at Kidderminster.
50035 Ark Royal	BR Class 50 Co-Co	Vulcan Foundry		BR Blue	Operational	Operational, based at Kidderminster.
50044 Exeter	BR Class 50 Co-Co	Vulcan Foundry		BR Blue	Overhaul	Under overhaul, based at Kidderminster.
50049 Defiance	BR Class 50 Co-Co	Vulcan Foundry		GBRf	Operational	Based at Kidderminster, mainline certified.
D1013 Western Ranger	BR Class 52 C-C	Swindon Works	D1013 'Western Ranger' sits inside the shed at Kidderminster Depot on the Severn Valley Railway during the 2023 Spring Diesel Festival. This photo was taken during a guided tour of the depot. This photo showcases the state of the loco, which is currently being overhauled. The time on this photo is incorrect, as I forgot to change the clock on my camera for BST, however, for archival purposes I have kept the erroneous time. It was taken 1 hour later then shown.	BR Blue	Overhaul	Undergoing overhaul at Kidderminster.
D1015 Western Champion	BR Class 52 C-C	Swindon Works		BR Blue	Operational	Operational, mainline certified.
D1048 Western Lady	BR Class 52 C-C	Crewe Works		BR Blue	Overhaul	Gifted to the Western Locomotive Association in October 2023.
D1062 Western Courier	BR Class 52 C-C	Crewe Works		BR Blue	Operational	Operational.

=== Diesel shunters ===
Number & name	Type	Builder	Photograph	Livery	Status	Notes
319290	Ruston 165DM 0-4-0DM	Ruston & Hornsby		Ruston Green	Operational	Formerly D2957 (fictitious). Based at Bewdley.
D2960 Silver Spoon	Ruston 165DM 0-4-0DM	Ruston & Hornsby		BR Green	Operational	Works No. 281269; carries fictitious number D2960. Based at Kidderminster.
11511	Ruston 165DE 0-4-0DE	Ruston & Hornsby		BR Black	Operational	Works No. 418596; carries fictitious number 11511. Based at Bridgnorth.
D2996 (07012)	BR Class 07 0-6-0DE	Ruston & Hornsby		BR Green	Operational	Operational, based at Bridgnorth.
D3022 (08015)	BR Class 08 0-6-0DE	Derby Works		BR Green	Operational	Operational, based at Kidderminster.
H3802 (D3802/08635)	BR Class 08 0-6-0DE	Derby Works		Vanguard	Operational	Converted to use a hydrogen fuel cell powertrain in collaboration with Vanguard Sustainable Transport Solutions. Launched in February 2026.
13201 (08133)	BR Class 08 0-6-0DE	Derby Works		BR Green	Operational	Formerly D3201. Operational, based at Kidderminster.
D4100 Dick Hardy (09012)	BR Class 09 0-6-0DE	Horwich Works		BR Green	Operational	Operational, based at Kidderminster.
09107	BR Class 09 0-6-0DE	Horwich Works		BR Blue	Overhaul	Major power unit overhaul. Based at Kidderminster.

== Diesel multiple units ==
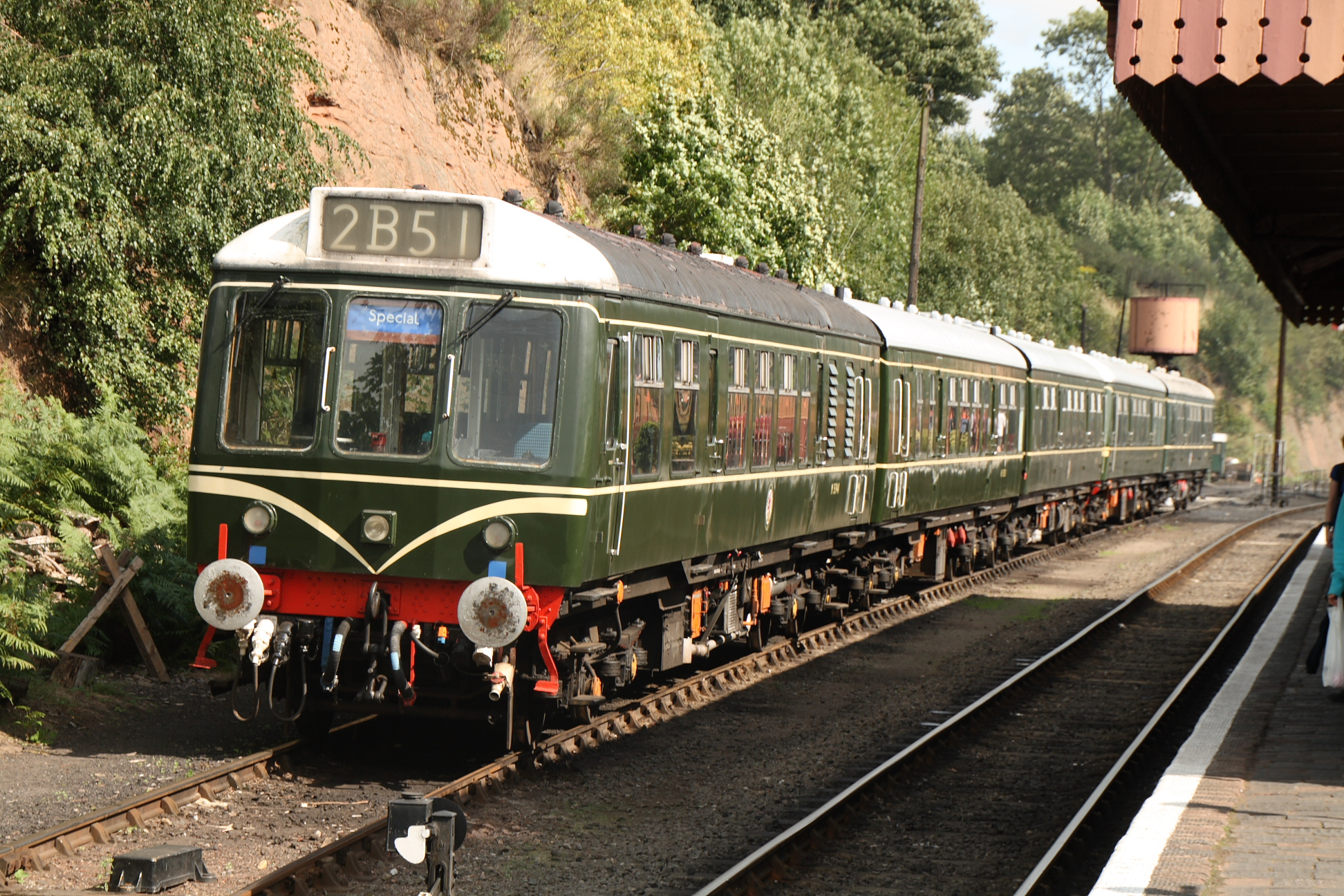
5 Class 108 vehicles at Bewdley on the SVR.

The SVR's BR Class 108 units comprise:

- M50933: Driving Motor Brake Second (DMBS), built 1960;
- M51941: DMBS, built 1960;
- E52064: Driving Motor Composite with lavatory (DMCL), built 1961;
- E56208: Driving Trailer Composite with lavatory (DTCL), built 1958, and;
- NE59250: Trailer Brake Second with lavatory (TBSL), built 1958.

The SVR's BR Class 101 units comprise:

- E50170: Driving Motor Composite with lavatory (DMCL), built 1957
- E50253: Driving Motor Brake Second (DMBS), built 1957
- E59303: Trailer Second with lavatory (TSL), built 1957

== Carriages ==
The SVR is home to around 70 passenger carriages, with those used in day-to-day service being of GWR, LMS, LNER, and British Railways Mark 1 origin.

== Wagons ==
The SVR is also home to more than 100 wagons, including many Great Western Railway wagons owned by the GWR 813 Preservation fund.

== Past members of the SVR fleet ==
Locomotives formerly resident on the SVR and which saw regular service there include:

=== Steam Locomotives ===
- 3205: GWR 2251 Class 0-6-0. Built 1946. First steam locomotive to arrive at SVR in 1967. Left the SVR in 1987.
- 3717 City of Truro: GWR 3700 Class 4-4-0. Built in 1903. On loan from the NRM from July 1984; overhauled in time for mainline use during the 150th anniversary celebrations of the GWR in 1985. Returned to the NRM in June 1986.
- 6960 Raveningham Hall: GWR 6959 Class Modified Hall 4-6-0. Built in 1944. Left in 1996, returned on hire between 2019 and 2021.
- 34053 Sir Keith Park: SR Battle of Britain Class 4-6-2. Built in 1946. Arrived newly restored in 2012. Returned to the Swanage Railway in January 2018.
- 45000: LMS Stanier Class 5 4-6-0. Built in 1935. On loan from the NRM between 1977 and 1988.
- 45110: LMS Stanier Class 5 4-6-0. Built in 1935. Resident from 1970, sold in 2023.
- 45690 Leander: LMS Jubilee Class 4-6-0. Built in 1936. Resident 1980–1981 (for overhaul) and 1983–1994. Classmate 45699 Galatea was also acquired with Leander but sold unrestored.
- 46521: LMS Ivatt Class 2 2-6-0. Built in 1953. Featured as "Blossom" in the 1990s television sitcom Oh, Doctor Beeching!. Left the SVR in 2001.
- 60009 Union of South Africa: LNER Class A4 4-6-2. Built in 1937. Left the SVR in 2007.
- 61994 The Great Marquess: LNER Class K4 2-6-0. Built in 1937. Arrived in 1972; owned by SVR chairman Viscount Garnock. Left the SVR in 2005.
- 70000 Britannia: BR Standard Class 7 4-6-2. Built in 1951. Restored at the SVR between 1971 and 1980, left in 1981.
- 193 Shropshire: Hunslet Austerity 0-6-0ST. Built in 1953 for the War Department. Resident between 1971 and 1981; named "Shropshire" in 1977.
- WD71516 Welsh Guardsman: Hunslet Austerity 0-6-0ST. Arrived 2020, left 2026.

=== Diesel locomotives ===
- D8059 (20059): BR Class 20 Bo-Bo. Arrived 2009, resident until 2017.
- D8188 (20188): BR Class 20 Bo-Bo. Arrived 2007, resident until 2017.
- 40106 Atlantic Conveyor: Class 40 1Co-Co1. Arrived 2018, left 2025.

The lists above are not intended to be a comprehensive record of every former resident and do not include the following:

- small industrial steam and diesel shunting locomotives used in the 1960s and early 1970s;
- locomotives which arrived at the SVR but left with restoration incomplete;
- locomotives which were acquired but scrapped as a source of parts;
- steam locomotives loaned to the SVR for static display, and;
- diesel locomotives loaned to the SVR primarily for non-passenger use.
