= List of Llangollen Railway rolling stock =

This is a list of rolling stock at Llangollen Railway, a preserved railway in Llangollen, North Wales.

== Steam locomotives ==
The collection is predominantly made up of ex-Great Western or Midland locomotives, with a small number of industrial engines.

=== Operational ===
FW = Facing Corwen, FE = Facing Llangollen

Number & Name	Description	History & Current Status	Livery	Owner(s)	Build Date	Direction	Photograph
No. 3802	GWR 2884 Class 2-8-0	Emerged from its 10-year overhaul in January 2018. Boiler ticket expires 2027. Re-entered service April 2024.	BR Unlined Black with Early Emblem	Private owner.	1938	FW	
No. 7754	GWR 5700 Class 0-6-0PT	Completed overhaul in November 2023. Boiler ticket expires in 2033.	GWR Green with BRITISH RAILWAYS Lettering.	Llangollen Railway Trust.	1930	FW	
No. 5459 Austin 1	Kitson and Company 0-6-0ST	Out of service September 2025 following discovery of a crack in the boiler.	Lined Green.	Llangollen Railway Trust	1932	FW	

== Diesel locomotives ==
Number & Name	Description	Current Status	Livery	Image
No. D2892 'Pilkington'	Yorkshire Engine Co. 0-4-0 Shunter	Operational	BR Green	
No. D2899	Yorkshire Engine Co. 0-4-0 Shunter	Requires motor repairs	BR Black	
No. 03162	BR 0-6-0 Class 03	Awaiting repairs to final drive built in 1960.	BR Blue	
No. 08195	British Rail Class 08 Shunter	Operational	BR Black	
No. 5310	BR Bo-Bo Class 26	Operational	BR Green	
No. 31271	BR Bo-Bo Class 31	Operational	Trainload Construction	
No. 47449	BR Co-Co Class 47	Operational	BR Blue	

== Locomotives formerly based at Llangollen ==
=== Steam Locomotives ===
Number & Name	Type	History & Current Status	Livery	Current Owner(s)	Photograph
No. 4936 Kinlet Hall	GWR 4900 Class 4-6-0	Built in 1929 at Swindon Works. Arrived at the LR in 1992 but never operated on the line due to being in ex Barry Scrapyard condition, the engine departed from Llangollen in 1996 for Tyseley where final restoration to running order was undertaken. The engine is now undergoing a mainline standard overhaul at Tyseley Locomotive Works, the engine is also now based at the West Somerset Railway.	N/A	Jon Jones-Pratt	
No. 5197	USATC S160 Class 2-8-0	Built as works no.8856 by the Lima Locomotive Company in Ohio, USA, in June 1945.	USATC Grey	Batt Holden Ltd	
No. 5199	GWR 5101 Class 2-6-2T	5199 spent most of its service career on GWR's Birmingham suburban lines, working local passenger trains. It was retired in 1963 when steam services were taken over by railcars, and remained in storage at Barry Scrapyard for 22 years. Its first home in preservation was the GWSR, where restoration was originally started, but it moved to Long Marston MoD and later Llangollen for the completion of its overhaul, finally returning to steam in 2003. It emerged from its 10-year overhaul in November 2014 and entered traffic on 6 December (the same year) for the Santa Specials. Boiler ticket will expire in 2024. Relocated to the West Somerset Railway until 31 December 2022.	BR Black, With early crest.	5199 Project.	
No. 5539	GWR 4575 Class	Built in 1928. Currently undergoing restoration at the Barry Island Railway.	N/A	Private owner.	
No. 5643	GWR 5600 Class 0-6-2T	Built in 1925 at Swindon Works. The engine is now based at the Ribble Steam Railway but is presently on long-term loan to the East Lancashire Railway.	BR Lined Green, Late Crest	Furness Railway Trust	
No. 6430	GWR 6400 Class 0-6-0PT	The 6400 series of pannier tanks were equipped to operate autotrains. 6430 was built at Swindon Works, completed in February 1937 and entered service in March 1937, the first of its class to have a whistle shield. It spent many years in Wales, although it was based at Laira from 19 May 1962. On 9 February 1963 it was moved to Tondu followed on 6 April 1963 to Exmouth Junction and then to Yeovil Town on 30 November 1963 from where it worked until it was condemned on 2 October 1964. On 5 June 1966, it started its career in preservation, moving initially to the Dart Valley Railway. However, it recently made a return to the Dart Valley Railway to cover for a locomotive shortage. It also appeared in some of the earliest scenes of "Five Go to Rehab" (Gold TV November 2012). The loco went to the South Devon Railway in April 2021 for repairs. Once completed it will go to an unnamed location due to the Llangollen Railway going into administration. It is currently under repairs, boiler ticket expires 2025.	BR Lined Green with Early Crest.	Hugh Shipton	
No. 7828 Odney Manor	GWR 7800 Class 4-6-0	Built in 1950 at Swindon Works. Only based at the line for a brief period in the 1980s before being moved to the East Lancashire Railway. The engine is now based at the West Somerset Railway and returned to service following an overhaul in December 2018.	BR Lined Green, Early Emblem	West Somerset Railway	
No. 44806 Magpie	LMS Stanier Class 5 4-6-0	Built in 1944 at Derby Works. It arrived at the LR in 1993 from The Science and Industry Museum in Manchester and work began to return the engine to steam following ten years on display, the overhaul of 44806 required repairs to the engines firebox which had cracked during its time at the Lakeside and Haverthwaite Railway in 1974. Returning to steam in 1995 the engine became a regular performer until 2003 when the engine was withdrawn for an overhaul. After returning to steam in 2007 it remained a regular performer, but following sale to the North Yorkshire Moors Railway by the owner's daughter the engine left the line in January 2014. Withdrawn for overhaul 1 January 2018. Following purchase by a private owner in February 2020, work on overhauling the locomotive commenced in October 2020.	BR Lined Black, Late Crest	Private Owner – Peter Best	
No. 45551 The Unknown Warrior	LMS Patriot Class; 4-6-0	Under construction. Like 6880 Betton Grange no original Patriot engines were preserved in either original or rebuilt condition, but unlike the grange, B17 & 4700 which are being built as new members of their classes "The Patriot Project's" engine will be a replica of an original engine. The engine chosen being 5551/45551 which will be named The Unknown Warrior, the original engine not being named in either LMS/BR days. The original engine was built at Crewe Works in May 1934 and was allocated to numerous sheds around the midland region. Its final shed allocation was at Edge Hill before being withdrawn in June 1962 and cut up in October of the same year. The replica engine is being built to modern mainline standards as it is planned to have the engine certified for mainline use in the future. In October 2018 the Llangollen Railway announced that they were unable to undertake further work on the construction of 45551. The engine departed from the railway in late October and moved to Crewe Heritage Centre where the boiler will be trial fitted, construction of the engine will then be undertaken in Crewe.	N/A (LMS Crimson lake on completion).	LMS Patriot Project	
No. 47298	LMS Fowler Class 3F 0-6-0T	Built in 1924 at Hunslet Engine Company in Leeds. Following restoration which was completed at Steamport and was used on the mainline which included appearing at the Rocket 150 Cavalcade in Rainhill in 1980 before arriving at the Llangollen Railway in 1983. After several years of reprising the role of Thomas the Tank Engine, The Locomotive departed for the East Lancashire Railway at Bury in 2012 following sale to Ian Riley. The locomotive recently re-entered service under a new private owner.	BR Unlined Black, Early Emblem	Riley and Son	
No. 76079	BR Standard Class 4 2-6-0	Built in 1957 at Horwich Works. Now operational at the North Yorkshire Moors Railway and mainline certified to work trains to Whitby and Battersby.	BR Lined Black, Early Emblem	North Yorkshire Moors Railway	
Jessie	Hunslet Engine Company; 0-6-0ST	Operational. Built in 1937. Rebuilt as Thomas the Tank Engine and re-entered service in February 2013 and carried on as Thomas until December 2018. The Locomotive was later re-converted back to Saddle Tank form at the Barry Tourist Railway before being re-located to Pontypool and Blaenavon Railway in April 2019. Boiler ticket expires in 2023.	East Moors Steel Works lined Black.	Private owner – Mike Pearce	
Desmond	Avonside Engine Company0-4-0ST	Built 1904. Moved to The Flour Mill (Forest of Dean) in November 2020 for major restoration work to continue, having been started at Llangollen.	N/A.	Llanelli and Mynydd Mawr Railway.	
No. 45337	LMS Stanier Class 5 4-6-0	Built 1937. Scheduled to move to the East Lancashire Railway in January 2021, having had its overhaul partly completed at Llangollen.	BR Unlined Black with Late Crest	26B Railway Company.	

=== Diesel Locomotives ===
Number & Name	Type	History & Current Status	Current Owner(s)	Build Date	Photograph
D1012 Cadbury No. 14	Hudswell Clarke 0-4-0DM	Built in 1956. Most likely sold to the Llangollen Railway in 1976 when the Cadbury rail system shut down. It was operational at the Llangollen Railway in 1979. Last Recorded at the Llangollen Railway in 2002. Moved to Cadbury World's car park some time between 2002 and 2007. As of 2015 it was located at Cadbury World. Early in 2022 moved to the Statfold Barn Railway near Tamworth and, after repainting in Cadbury livery, was installed as the gate guardian there in July 2022.		1956	
1901 'Davy'	British Rail Class 08/10 Hybrid 0-6-0DE	Built by English Electric at Dick Kerr Works, works number 1901. This loco was one of a small batch built by English Electric in the 1950s specifically for industrial use, and was based at the ICI plant at Winnington (now Brunner Mond), Northwich in Cheshire. The locomotive was named after Sir Humphry Davy. The loco received numerous modifications whilst under ICI ownership, including double-glazing, dual brakes and non-standard light clusters. In 1973 the locomotive was renamed John Brunner. It was moved to the Llangollen Railway and referred to under its original name. The locomotive was sold to the Battlefield Line Railway in May 2021.	Shackerstone Railway Society	Late 1950s	
No. D8142 / 20142	BR Bo-Bo Class 20	Sold to Michael Owen in 2008, presently operational on the mainline.	20189 Ltd	1966	
No. D5081 / 24081	BR Bo-Bo Class 24	Final Class 24 in British Rail service, withdrawn October 1980. Resident at Llangollen before being sold on.	24081 Locomotive Group	1960	
No. D7629 / 25279	BR Bo-Bo Class 25	Entered preservation on 19 March 1988, moving by road to Llangollen where it remained until 1997. Thereafter it was loaned to the Chinnor and Princes Risborough Railway, then to the Gloucestershire and Warwickshire Railway, before finally ending-up at the Northampton and Lamport Railway in 1999. The locomotive was unable to return to Llangollen Railway following the management's decision to strictly limit the number of diesel locomotives based there. The combination of this and a number of accumlated faults saw the loco put up for sale in April 2000.	East Lancs Diesel Group	1965	
No. D7663 / 25313	BR Bo-Bo Class 25	Sold from its owners "Llangollen Diesel Group" to Wensleydale Railway in December 2009.	Harry Needle	1966	
No. D6940	BR Co-Co Class 37	Sold from its owners "Llangollen Diesel Group" to Boden Rail Engineering Ltd in December 2018.	Boden Rail Engineering	1964	
No. 37901	BR Co-Co Class 37	Operational, owned by Europhoenix.	Europhoenix	1960	
No. 46010	BR Co-Co Class 46	Operational at Great Central Railway (Nottingham).	D05 Preservation Ltd	1962	
