= Fritwell Manor =

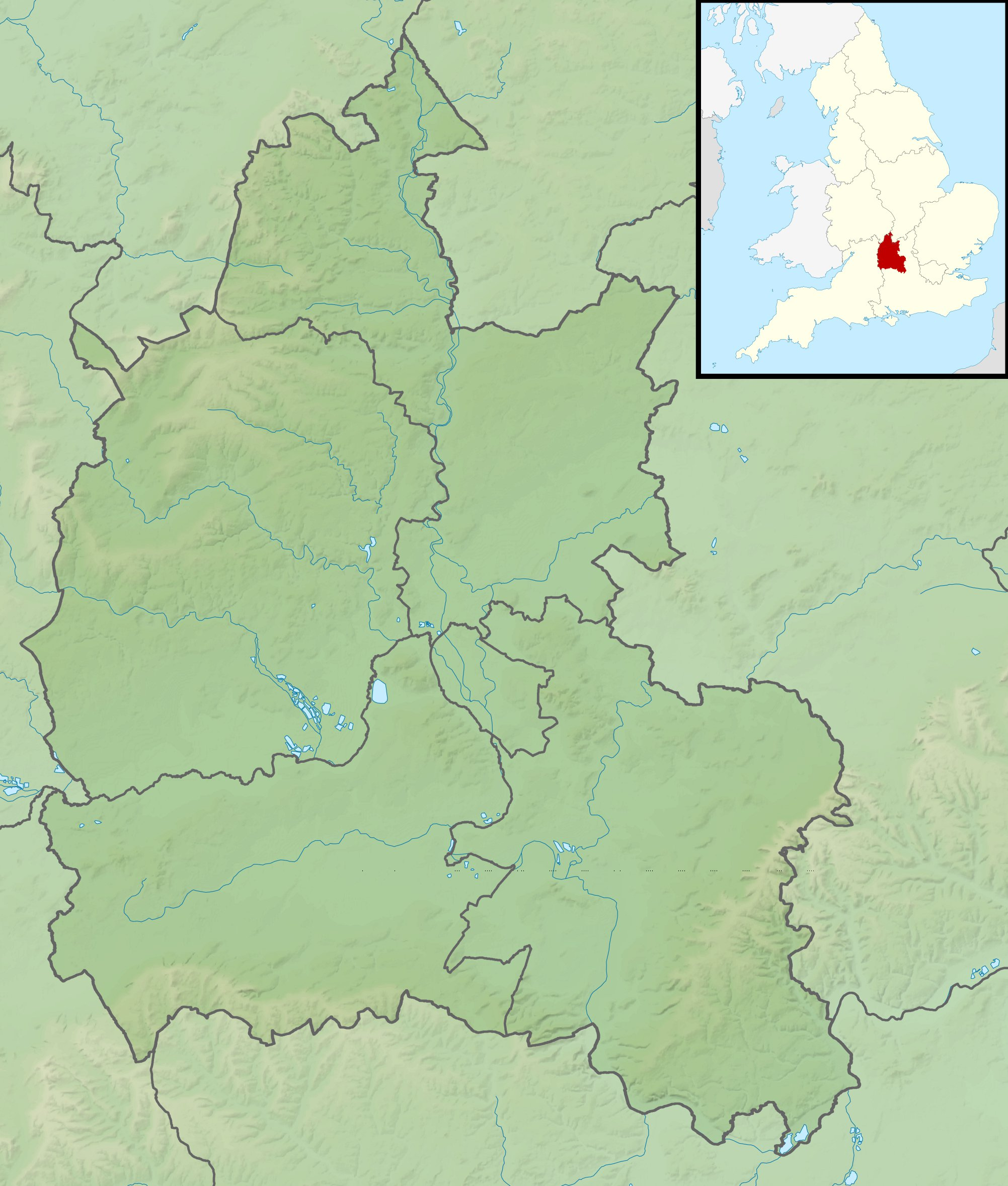
- Location within Oxfordshire
- 51.9613°N 1.2387°W
- Type: House
- Location: Fritwell, Oxfordshire

History
- Built: 17th century, with later alterations

Site notes
- Architectural style: Vernacular
- Governing body: Privately owned

Listed Building – Grade II*
- Official name: Fritwell Manor
- Designated: 26 November 1951
- Reference no.: 1266393

Listed Building – Grade II
- Official name: Garage and stables 40M South East of Fritwell Manor
- Designated: 26 February 1988
- Reference no.: 1266439

Fritwell Manor is a house in Fritwell, Oxfordshire, England. It is a Grade II* listed building.

== History ==
In 1520, the manor at Fritwell was owned by Margaret Boleyn, grandmother of Anne Boleyn, the second wife of Henry VIII of England. The present house dates mainly from 1619, when it was built for George Yorke. In the mid-19th century the manor was home to Robert Barclay Allardice, the noted pedestrian. From 1893 it was bought and restored by Thomas Garner. Garner formed a thirty-year partnership with George Frederick Bodley, the architectural firm of Bodley & Garner being among the most successful of the late Victorian era. Garner died at the manor in 1903, after which it was bought by John Simon, 1st Viscount Simon, who served as Home Secretary, Foreign Secretary, Chancellor of the Exchequer and Lord Chancellor. Simon, who purchased the house in 1911, greatly extended it in the 1920s, before selling up in 1933.

The steam locomotive 7815 of the GWR Manor Class was named for the house; it was built in 1939 and withdrawn from service in 1964.

== Architecture and description ==
Fritwell Manor is constructed to a traditional Elizabethan E-plan. The house is of two storeys with attics, and a three-bay frontage. It is a Grade II* listed building.

== Sources ==
- Brooks, Alan; Sherwood, Jennifer (2017). Oxfordshire. The Buildings Of England. New Haven, US and London: Yale University Press. ISBN 978-0-300-20930-3.
- Loades, David (2011). The Boleyns: The Rise & Fall of a Tudor Family. Amberley Publishing. ISBN 978-1-445-60304-9.
- Lobel, Mary D. (1959). A History of the County of Oxford. Victoria County History. Vol. 6.
