= Cambrian Coast Express =

Named British express train

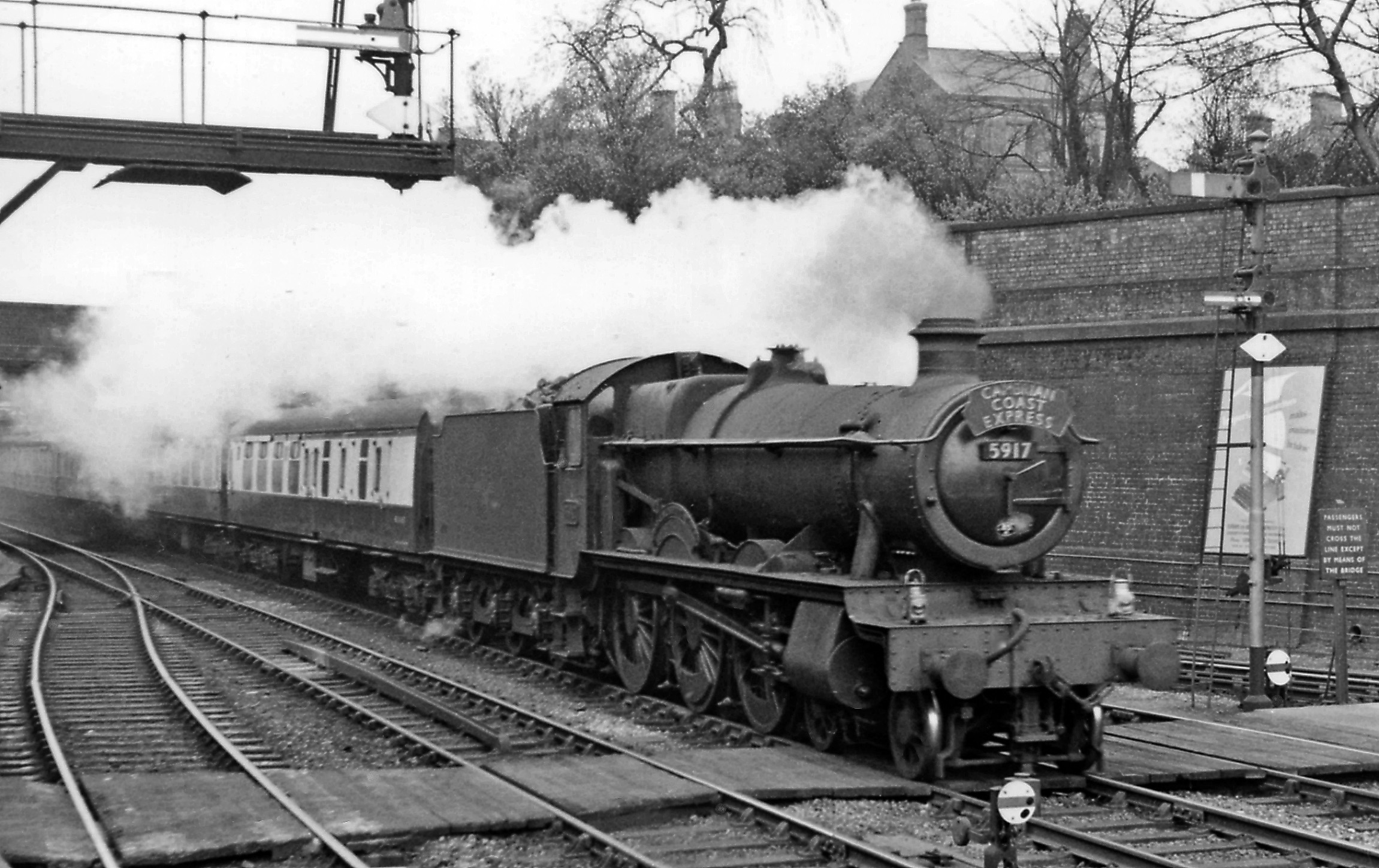
An up (London-bound) Cambrian Coast Express passing through Wellington station in 1960.

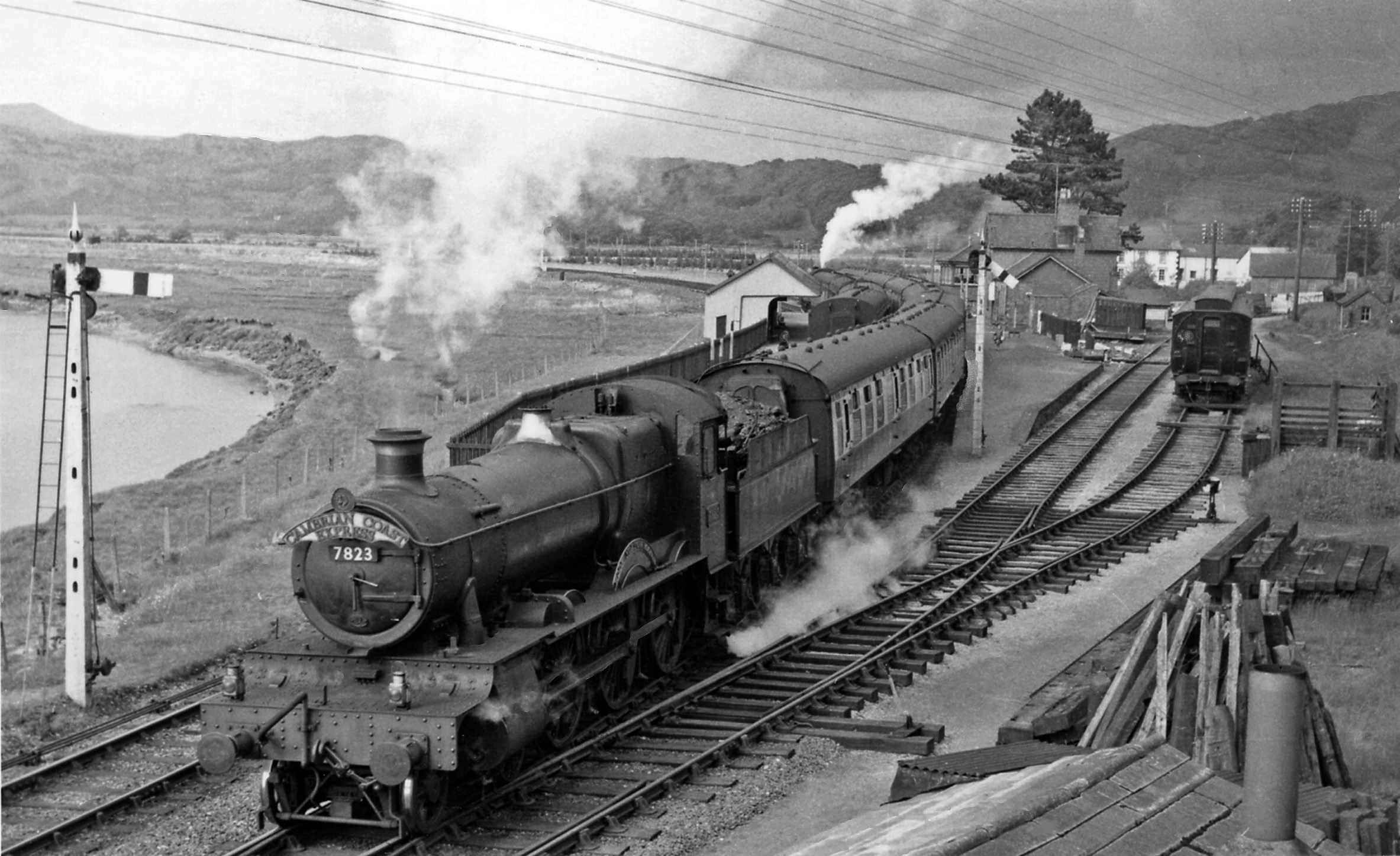
A down Cambrian Coast Express at Glandyfi station in 1962.

The Cambrian Coast Express was a named passenger train of the Great Western Railway (GWR), and later British Rail, running from London Paddington via Shrewsbury to Aberystwyth and Pwllheli over the Cambrian Line.

== GWR era ==
Prior to amalgamation with the GWR in 1923, the line beyond Buttington Junction near Welshpool was owned and operated by the Cambrian Railways, and passengers from England normally changed to a Cambrian Railways train at Shrewsbury. But in July and August 1921, the GWR ran a daily through express from Paddington to Aberystwyth and Pwllheli.

The first official use of the name Cambrian Coast Express was in 1927 when the train ran only on summer Fridays and Saturdays. By 1939 the through train was running only on summer Saturdays. It left London Paddington at 10:20 with calls at Leamington Spa, Birmingham Snow Hill, and Wolverhampton Low Level, which was reached at 12:44. Here, owing to weight restrictions over the Cambrian Line, the GWR Castle Class 4-6-0 locomotive was changed for two GWR Duke Class 4-4-0 engines or for a GWR Manor Class 4-6-0 for the non-stop run to Welshpool, using the Shrewsbury Abbey Foregate curve to avoid a stop and reversal of direction at Shrewsbury. Beyond Welshpool, calls were made at Machynlleth, Dovey Junction and Borth to reach Aberystwyth at 15:55, a total of 5 hours 35 minutes for the 235-mile (378 km) journey from London. In the reverse direction the journey was 25 minutes longer, at six hours; departing Aberystwyth at 10:00 with an additional stop at Newtown, but with otherwise unchanged station calls, and locomotive change at Wolverhampton. The train became the 14:00 departure from Birmingham to arrive at Paddington at 16:00.

== British Rail era ==
After World War II, the Cambrian Coast Express was re-introduced on Saturdays only and its seasonal operation continued under British Rail, usually with through coaches to both Aberystwyth and Pwllheli. By 1957 it was running every day except Sundays all year round. During the summer timetable, it was usually hauled by a "King" class locomotive as far as Wolverhampton Low Level station, where there would be an engine change, usually to a "Castle" class locomotive which took the train on to Shrewsbury, where there was a second engine change as Castles were outside the loading gauge for the Cambrian Line.

Two engine changes in such a short distance was obviously inefficient and following gauge testing with 6006 "King George I" in the spring of 1958, a King worked the train through from Paddington to Shrewsbury from the start of the 1958 summer timetable. At Shrewsbury the train would be split into two sections, one for Aberystwyth and one for Pwllheli. The King would return to Paddington with one of the regular Birkenhead–Paddington expresses later that afternoon.

In the up direction, the two sections would run independently as far as Wolverhampton, with the Pwllheli section using the Abbey Foregate triangle to omit the stop at Shrewsbury. The two sections would then be combined at Wolverhampton. The motive power for each section was usually a "Manor" class 4-6-0 or "Dukedog" 4-4-0, the latter of which were often double-headed.

The winter timetable arrangements were similar, except that following the arrival of the King with the down train at Shrewsbury, some coaches would be detached and the train taken forward as far as Machynlleth before being divided. These arrangements were mirrored for the up train, with a Castle taking the train through from Shrewsbury to Paddington.

The Paddington to Shrewsbury portion of the journey switched to diesel in 1962, with Class 52 'Westerns' replacing the Kings, though in 1964 new British Railways Class 4 steam locomotives replaced the ex-GWR Manors west of Shrewsbury. More fundamental change was to follow in March 1967, when the Cambrian Coast Express switched its London terminus from Paddington to Euston and was rerouted over the West Coast Main Line, with electric traction to Wolverhampton High Level, and Class 24 diesels, usually in pairs, replacing steam from Shrewsbury. These in turn were replaced by pairs of Class 25 diesels in 1974, and Class 37s with air-conditioned coaches from 1985. Class 86 or 87 electric locomotives were the usual traction over the electrified portion of the journey between Wolverhampton and London Euston.

Between 1967 and its final withdrawal in 1991, the Cambrian Coast Express was operated as an extension to the regular-interval service over the West Coast Main Line between London and Wolverhampton, latterly as part of the Inter City network. In the winter 1989–1990 timetable, it left London at 15:40, arriving in Aberystwyth 21:00; the return working left Aberystwyth at 07:13, arriving at London Euston at 12:24. There were no longer any through coaches to the northern part of the Cambrian Line: passengers for stations to Pwllheli had to change at Machynlleth.

== The Cambrian ==
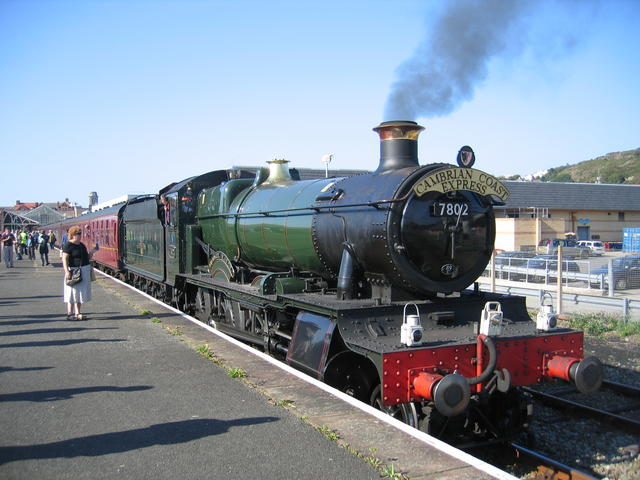
Ex-GWR Manor Class 7802 Bradley Manor sits waiting to depart from Aberystwyth with the Cambrian Coast Express, September 2006

The Cambrian Coast Express name was revived in summer 2006 by Arriva Trains Wales, as a tourist steam service which ran from Machynlleth to Porthmadog or Pwllheli. In 2007, it was taken over by West Coast Railways and rebranded The Cambrian. In 2010 it was cancelled by Network Rail due to the installation of a trial signalling system ERTMS.

== See also ==
- List of named passenger trains of the United Kingdom
