= GWR 7800 Class 7821 Ditcheat Manor =

Preserved British steam locomotive

Ditcheat Manor
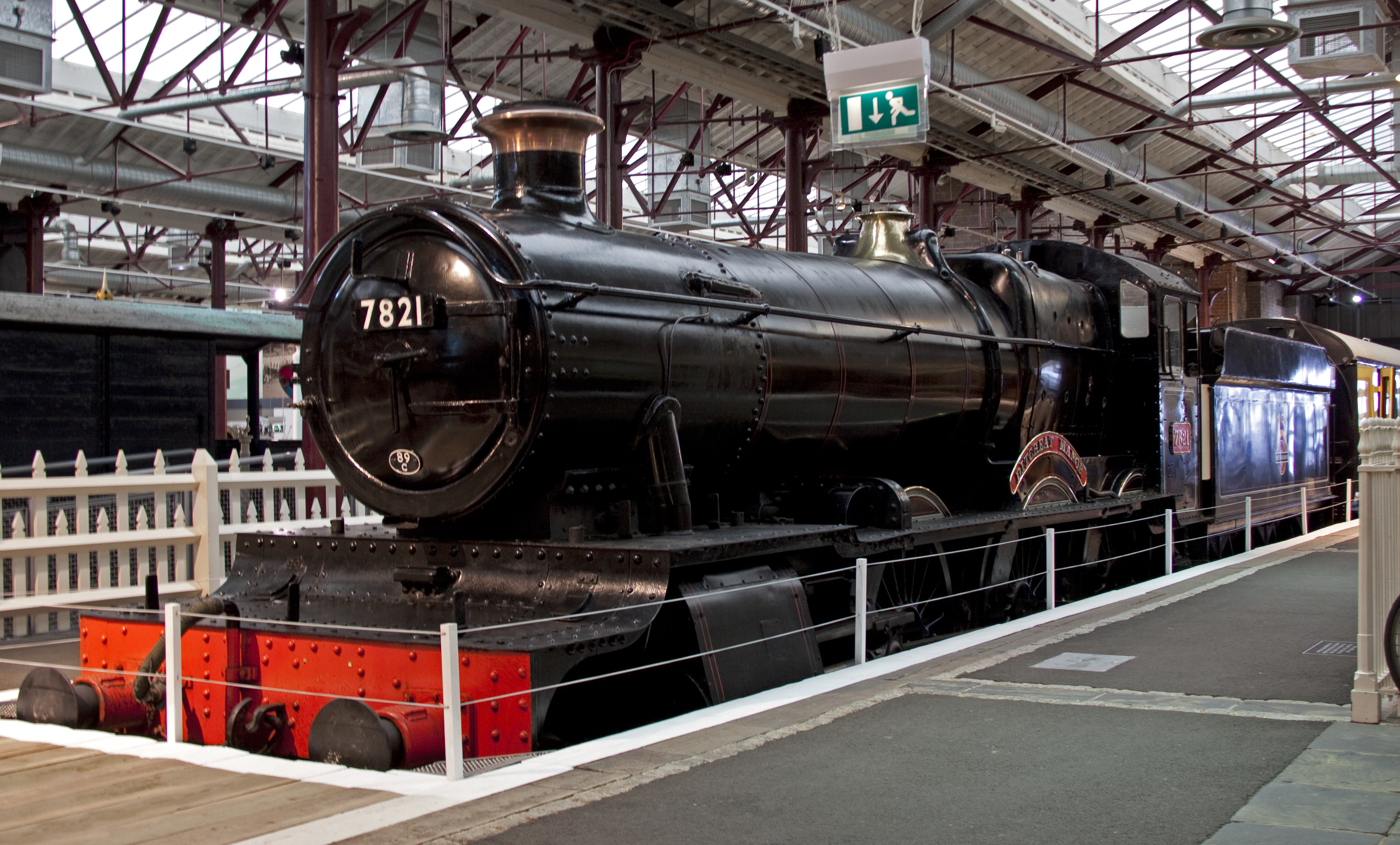
- 7821 Ditcheat Manor on display at the Swindon Steam Museum.
Type and origin
- Power type: Steam
- Build date: November 1950
Specifications
- Configuration
  - Whyte: 4-6-0
  - UIC: 2'Ch2
- Gauge: 4 ft 8 1/2 in (1,435 mm) standard gauge
- Leading dia.: 3 ft 0 in (914 mm)
- Driver dia.: 5 ft 8 in (1,727 mm)
- Minimum curve: 6 chains (396 ft; 121 m) normal, 5 chains (330 ft; 101 m) slow
- Wheelbase: Loco: 27 ft 1 in (8.26 m); Loco & tender: 52 ft 1 3/4 in (15.89 m)
- Length: 61 ft 9 1/4 in (18.83 m)
- Width: 8 ft 11 in (2.718 m)
- Height: 13 ft 0 in (3.962 m)
- Axle load: 17 long tons 5 cwt (38,600 lb or 17.5 t) (19.3 short tons)
- Loco weight: 68 long tons 18 cwt (154,300 lb or 70 t) (77.2 short tons) full
- Tender weight: 40 long tons 0 cwt (89,600 lb or 40.6 t) (44.8 short tons) full
- Fuel type: Coal
- Fuel capacity: 7 long tons 0 cwt (15,700 lb or 7.1 t) (7.8 short tons)
- Water cap.: 3,500 imp gal (16,000 L; 4,200 US gal)
- Firebox
  - Grate area: 22.1 sq ft (2.05 m^{2})
- Boiler: GWR Standard No. 14
- Boiler pressure: 225 psi (1.55 MPa)
- Heating surface
  - Firebox: 140.0 sq ft (13.01 m^{2})
  - Tubes and flues: 1,285.5 sq ft (119.43 m^{2})
- Superheater
  - Heating area: 160.0 sq ft (14.86 m^{2})
- Cylinders: Two, outside
- Cylinder size: 18 in × 30 in (457 mm × 762 mm)
Performance figures
- Tractive effort: 27,340 lbf (121.61 kN)
Career
- Operators: British Railways
- Class: 7800 'Manor' Class
- Numbers: 7821
- Locale: Western Region
- Retired: 1965

Great Western Railway 7800 Class No. 7821 Ditcheat Manor is a preserved British steam locomotive.

The second of the last batch of 10 engines of the thirty-strong class, 7821 was actually built by British Railways in 1950. Like most of the class of lightweight 4-6-0s, it was allocated to lines in Mid Wales, but was also based Oxley and Newton Abbot. 7821 was withdrawn in November 1965 and was sent to Woodham Brothers scrapyard in Barry, Vale of Glamorgan, South Wales.

Rescued from Barry in 1980, it was sent to the embryonic Gloucestershire Warwickshire Railway, before moving to the Llangollen Railway and then Swindon, restoration being completed in 1998, when it first steamed at the West Somerset Railway. The loco then worked on the Great Central Railway in Leicestershire, but in late 2005 moved to the Cambrian Railways Trust. 7821 moved again in 2005 to the Churnet Valley Railway where it served its last months of its boiler ticket in traffic.

In 2007, the West Somerset Railway Association bought 7821 from its private owner, in part funded by reselling GWR 0-6-0PT No. 6412 to its original owner, the South Devon Railway. The locomotive was initially moved to Williton, and then in 2010 to Bishops Lydeard. In light of a mechanical examination showing that the locomotive needed extensive and expensive chassis and boiler work, whilst funding is raised for its overhaul the WSRA agreed a static display contract with the Museum of the Great Western Railway, Swindon for a minimum contract period of five years. The locomotive was subsequently relocated to the museum by road on 14 November 2010. On 21 August 2018, the locomotive was relocated to the nearby Swindon Designer Outlet in place of classmate No. 7819 Hinton Manor.

== Allocations ==
First shed November 1950	March 1959	May 1965	Last Shed
Oswestry	Tyseley	Wolverhampton Oxley	Shrewsbury
