= GWR 7800 Class 7827 Lydham Manor =

Preserved British steam locomotive

Lydham Manor
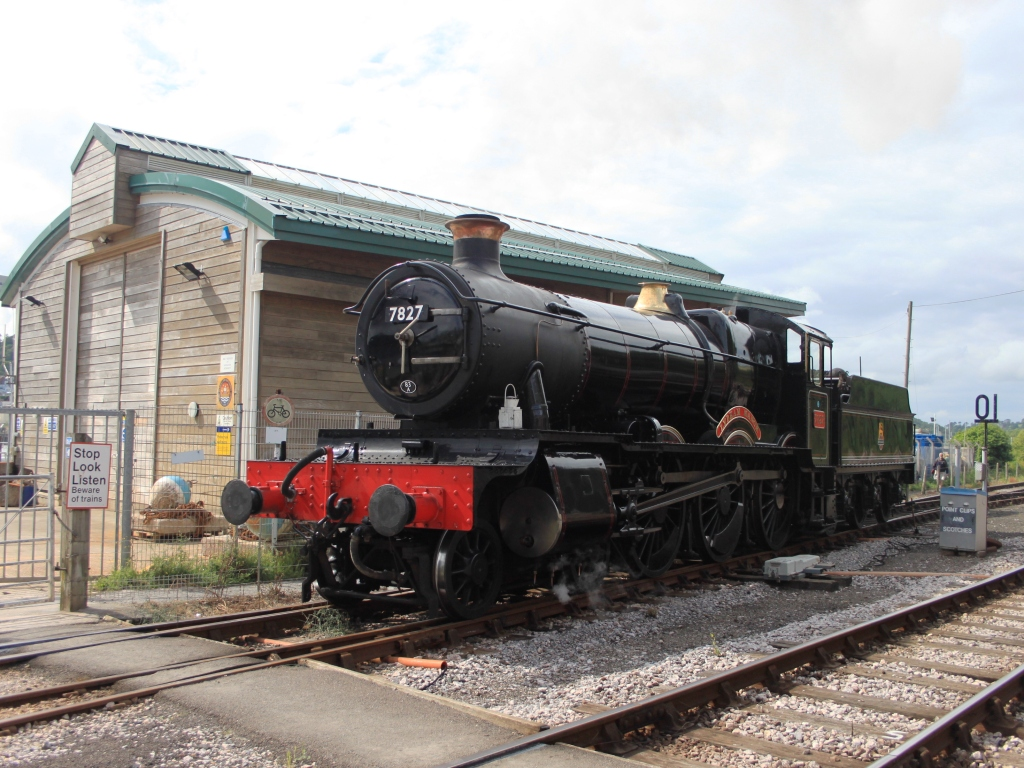
- 7827 Lydham Manor at Hoodown on the Dartmouth Steam Railway.
Type and origin
- Power type: Steam
- Build date: December 1950
Specifications
- Configuration
  - Whyte: 4-6-0
  - UIC: 2'Ch2
- Gauge: 4 ft 8 1/2 in (1,435 mm) standard gauge
- Leading dia.: 3 ft 0 in (914 mm)
- Driver dia.: 5 ft 8 in (1,727 mm)
- Minimum curve: 6 chains (396 ft; 121 m) normal, 5 chains (330 ft; 101 m) slow
- Wheelbase: Loco: 27 ft 1 in (8.26 m); Loco & tender: 52 ft 1 3/4 in (15.89 m)
- Length: 61 ft 9 1/4 in (18.83 m)
- Width: 8 ft 11 in (2.718 m)
- Height: 13 ft 0 in (3.962 m)
- Axle load: 17 long tons 5 cwt (38,600 lb or 17.5 t) (19.3 short tons)
- Loco weight: 68 long tons 18 cwt (154,300 lb or 70 t) (77.2 short tons) full
- Tender weight: 40 long tons 0 cwt (89,600 lb or 40.6 t) (44.8 short tons) full
- Fuel type: Coal
- Fuel capacity: 7 long tons 0 cwt (15,700 lb or 7.1 t) (7.8 short tons)
- Water cap.: 3,500 imp gal (16,000 L; 4,200 US gal)
- Firebox
  - Grate area: 22.1 sq ft (2.05 m^{2})
- Boiler: GWR Standard No. 14
- Boiler pressure: 225 psi (1.55 MPa)
- Heating surface
  - Firebox: 140.0 sq ft (13.01 m^{2})
  - Tubes and flues: 1,285.5 sq ft (119.43 m^{2})
- Superheater
  - Heating area: 160.0 sq ft (14.86 m^{2})
- Cylinders: Two, outside
- Cylinder size: 18 in × 30 in (457 mm × 762 mm)
Performance figures
- Tractive effort: 27,340 lbf (121.61 kN)
Career
- Operators: Western Region
- Class: 7800 'Manor' Class
- Numbers: 7827
- Retired: 1965
- Current owner: Dartmouth Steam Railway & Riverboat Company
- Disposition: Preserved

Great Western Railway 7800 Class No. 7827 Lydham Manor is a preserved British steam locomotive. It is currently (March 2013) owned by and based on the Dartmouth Steam Railway.

The locomotive was built in December 1950. Its first shed allocation was at Chester. In March 1959, its shed allocation was moved to Oswestry. It conducted improved draughting tests in February 1954. In May 1965, it received its last shed allocation at Shrewsbury. No. 7827 was withdrawn in October 1965 and acquired by Woodham's of Barry, Wales, in May 1966. It was sold to Dart Valley Railway and left the scrapyard as the fifth departure from Barry in June 1970. No. 7827 was restored in 1972.

It carried the Great Western Livery, which it would never have carried while in mainline service, as it was built two years after the end of the Great Western Railway (GWR). In 2011, Lydham Manor was reintroduced at the Churston Heritage Festival carrying British Rail all-black livery and bearing the temporary nameplates Torquay Manor and number plates of No. 7800 for the festival.

Lydham Manor has been on loan to other heritage railways/centres including, Didcot Railway Centre in 2010 before it was painted in BR black, South Devon Railway in a visit for September 2013, and then traveling to West Somerset Railway in October 2013 for the steam gala festival.

== Allocations ==
First shed December 1950	March 1959	May 1965	Last Shed
Chester	Oswestry	Shrewsbury	Shrewsbury
