= GWR 7800 Class 7820 Dinmore Manor =

Preserved British steam locomotive

7820 Dinmore Manor
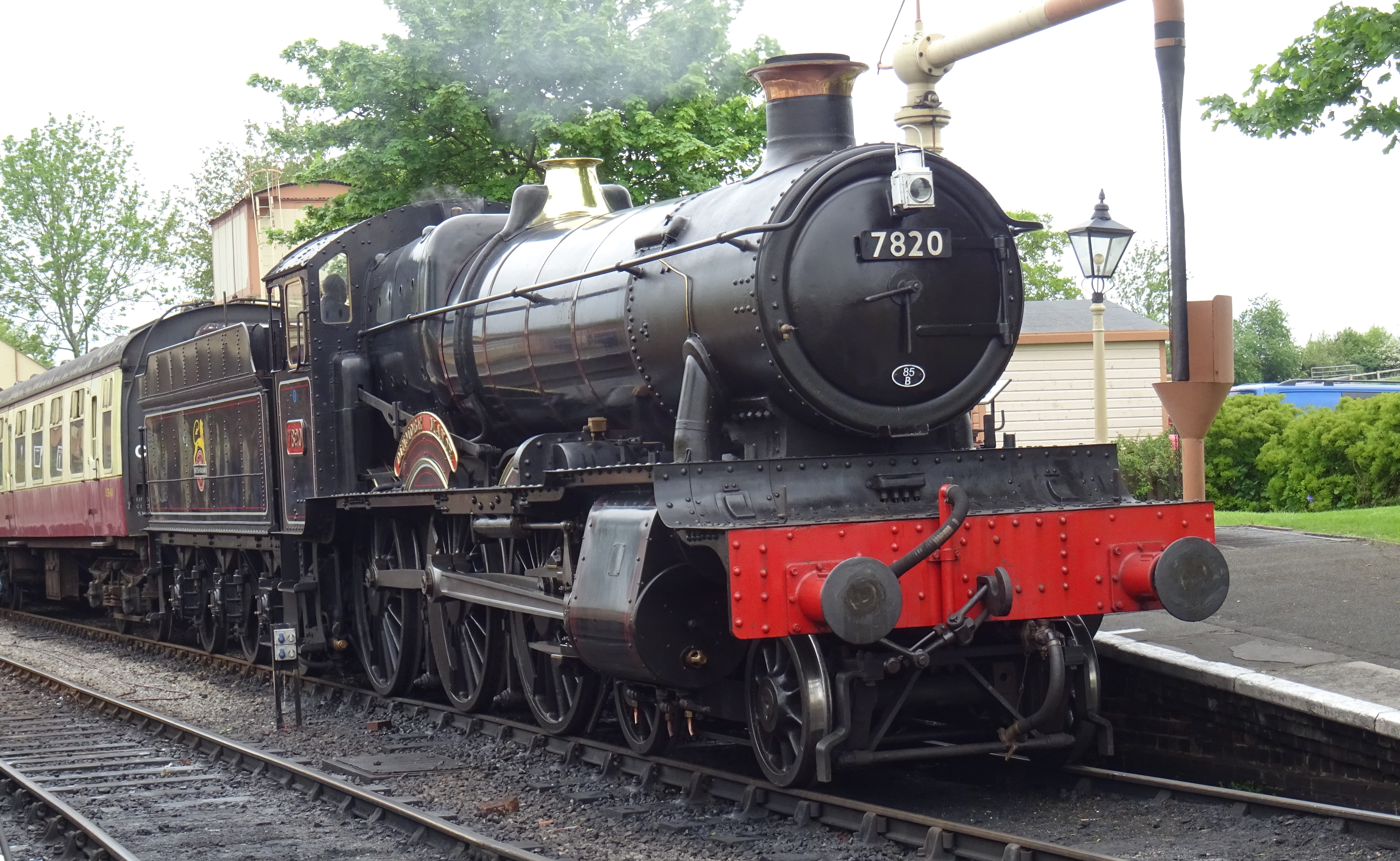
- 7820 Dinmore Manor on the Gloucestershire Warwickshire Railway in 2023
Type and origin
- Power type: Steam
- Build date: November 1950
Specifications
- Configuration
  - Whyte: 4-6-0
  - UIC: 2'Ch2
- Gauge: 4 ft 8 1/2 in (1,435 mm) standard gauge
- Leading dia.: 3 ft 0 in (914 mm)
- Driver dia.: 5 ft 8 in (1,727 mm)
- Minimum curve: 6 chains (396 ft; 121 m) normal, 5 chains (330 ft; 101 m) slow
- Wheelbase: Loco: 27 ft 1 in (8.26 m); Loco & tender: 52 ft 1 3/4 in (15.89 m)
- Length: 61 ft 9 1/4 in (18.83 m)
- Width: 8 ft 11 in (2.718 m)
- Height: 13 ft 0 in (3.962 m)
- Axle load: 17 long tons 5 cwt (38,600 lb or 17.5 t) (19.3 short tons)
- Loco weight: 68 long tons 18 cwt (154,300 lb or 70 t) (77.2 short tons) full
- Tender weight: 40 long tons 0 cwt (89,600 lb or 40.6 t) (44.8 short tons) full
- Fuel type: Coal
- Fuel capacity: 7 long tons 0 cwt (15,700 lb or 7.1 t) (7.8 short tons)
- Water cap.: 3,500 imp gal (16,000 L; 4,200 US gal)
- Firebox
  - Grate area: 22.1 sq ft (2.05 m^{2})
- Boiler: GWR Standard No. 14
- Boiler pressure: 225 psi (1.55 MPa)
- Heating surface
  - Firebox: 140.0 sq ft (13.01 m^{2})
  - Tubes and flues: 1,285.5 sq ft (119.43 m^{2})
- Superheater
  - Heating area: 160.0 sq ft (14.86 m^{2})
- Cylinders: Two, outside
- Cylinder size: 18 in × 30 in (457 mm × 762 mm)
Performance figures
- Tractive effort: 27,340 lbf (121.61 kN)
Career
- Operators: British Railways
- Class: 7800 'Manor' Class
- Numbers: 7820
- Retired: 1965
- Current owner: Dinmore Manor Locomotive Limited

7820 Dinmore Manor is a British Railways locomotive, part of the Manor Class. It is one of nine locomotives preserved from the class, which originally numbered 30.

Named after the ancient 12th century Knights Hospitaller preceptory Dinmore Manor in Herefordshire, the locomotive was built to a Great Western Railway design by British Railways in the ex-Great Western Works at Swindon in 1950, and was initially based at Oswestry. It was withdrawn from service in November 1965 from Shrewsbury, having been the last of its class to run with BR, and moved to Woodham Brothers scrapyard in Barry, Vale of Glamorgan, South Wales.

The locomotive was purchased in 1979 by the Gwili Railway and was moved to Bronwydd Arms for restoration. A lack of facilities and funds resulted in very little restoration work being carried out, with the locomotive being sold in 1983.

The engine was eventually restored at the Birmingham Railway Museum, with the West Somerset Railway Company providing a financial 'leg-up' to the owning Dinmore Manor Fund in 1995 to help finish the job. The engine then made its debut on the West Somerset Railway over the summer of 1995, and ran there for nearly 9 years.

The locomotive's first ten-year boiler certificate expired in July 2004, with the engine eventually returning to the Tyseley Locomotive Works for overhaul. This was completed in April 2014, and Dinmore Manor subsequently entered service at its new base at the Gloucestershire Warwickshire Railway. While it remains based there, the locomotive has visited various other lines since resteaming. In August and September 2014, it worked on the North Norfolk Railway, before revisiting the West Somerset Railway in October. The engine then visited the Great Central Railway at Loughborough in January & February 2015 before returning to the Gloucestershire Warwickshire Railway until July of that year, when the engine went on loan to the Dartmouth Steam Railway until the end of August, before visiting the Severn Valley Railway in November, where it ran alongside its GWR built sisters 7802 and 7812, to mark 50 years since all 3 were among the last 4 members of the class (along with fellow survivor 7821) to be withdrawn by BR in November 1965.

The locomotive was withdrawn from service at the Gloucestershire Warwickshire Railway in January 2025 following the expiry of its boiler certificate.

== Allocations ==
First shed	Oswestry
March 1959	Laira
May 1965	Oxley
Last shed	Shrewsbury
