= GWR 7800 Class 7812 Erlestoke Manor =

British steam locomotive

Erlestoke Manor
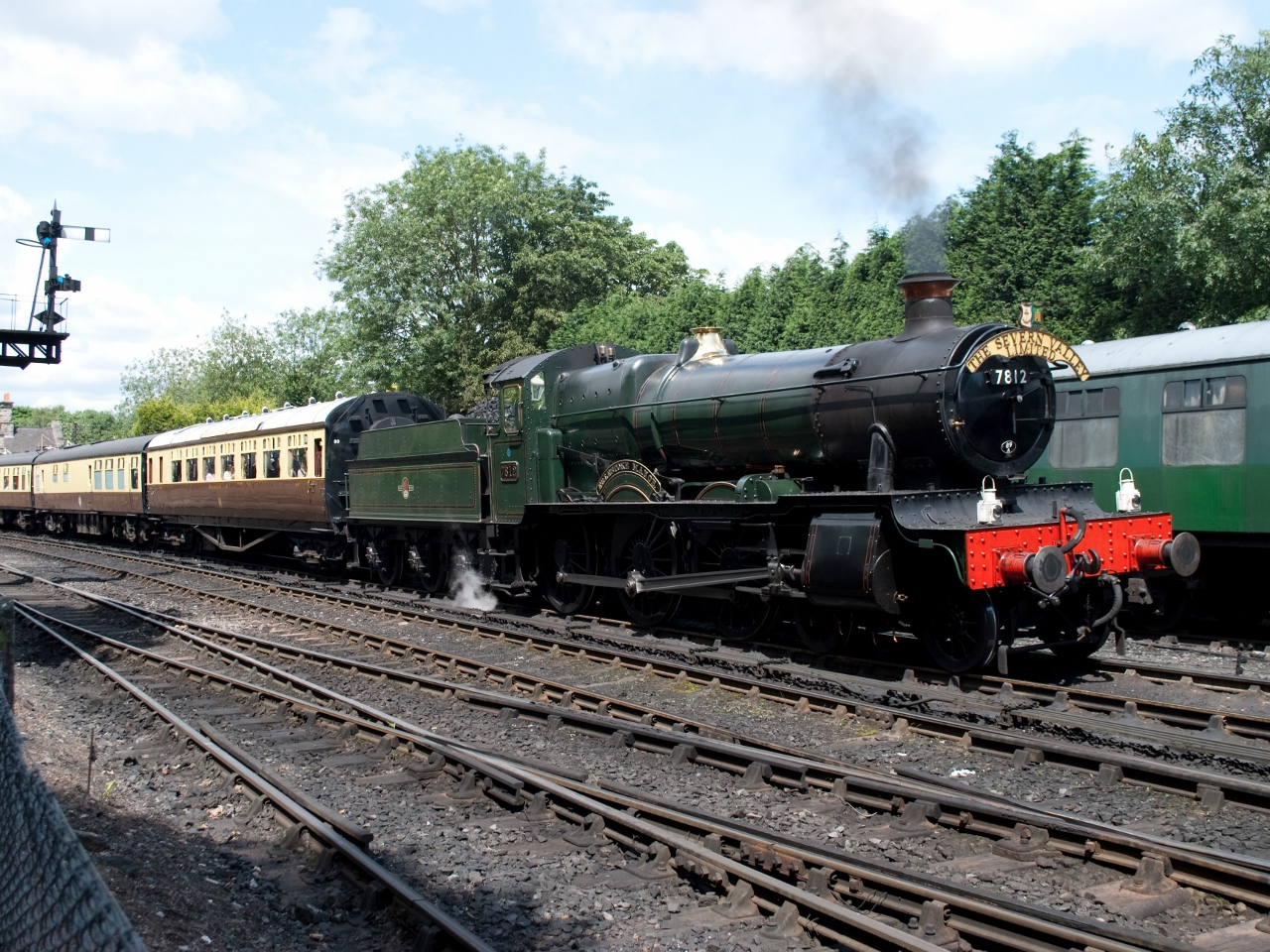
- 7812 Erlestoke Manor at Bridgnorth station in 2012
Type and origin
- Power type: Steam
- Build date: January 1939
Specifications
- Configuration
  - Whyte: 4-6-0
  - UIC: 2'Ch2
- Gauge: 4 ft 8 1/2 in (1,435 mm) standard gauge
- Leading dia.: 3 ft 0 in (914 mm)
- Driver dia.: 5 ft 8 in (1,727 mm)
- Minimum curve: 6 chains (396 ft; 121 m) normal, 5 chains (330 ft; 101 m) slow
- Wheelbase: Loco: 27 ft 1 in (8.26 m); Loco & tender: 52 ft 1 3/4 in (15.89 m)
- Length: 61 ft 9 1/4 in (18.83 m)
- Width: 8 ft 11 in (2.718 m)
- Height: 13 ft 0 in (3.962 m)
- Axle load: 17 long tons 5 cwt (38,600 lb or 17.5 t) (19.3 short tons)
- Loco weight: 68 long tons 18 cwt (154,300 lb or 70 t) (77.2 short tons) full
- Tender weight: 40 long tons 0 cwt (89,600 lb or 40.6 t) (44.8 short tons) full
- Fuel type: Coal
- Fuel capacity: 7 long tons 0 cwt (15,700 lb or 7.1 t) (7.8 short tons)
- Water cap.: 3,500 imp gal (16,000 L; 4,200 US gal)
- Firebox
  - Grate area: 22.1 sq ft (2.05 m^{2})
- Boiler: GWR Standard No. 14
- Boiler pressure: 225 psi (1.55 MPa)
- Heating surface
  - Firebox: 140.0 sq ft (13.01 m^{2})
  - Tubes and flues: 1,285.5 sq ft (119.43 m^{2})
- Superheater
  - Heating area: 160.0 sq ft (14.86 m^{2})
- Cylinders: Two, outside
- Cylinder size: 18 in × 30 in (457 mm × 762 mm)
Performance figures
- Tractive effort: 27,340 lbf (121.61 kN)
Career
- Operators: Great Western Railway; British Railways
- Class: Manor
- Numbers: 7812
- Retired: 1965
- Current owner: Erlestoke Manor Fund
- Disposition: Operational

7812 Erlestoke Manor is a preserved GWR 7800 Class steam locomotive, operated by the Great Western Railway and later British Railways. Owned by the Erlestoke Manor Fund, as at December 2022 it was in operational condition on the Severn Valley Railway.

== GWR/BR operations ==
Built at Swindon Works in January 1939, it was first allocated to Bristol Bath Road depot. It was reallocated to Newton Abbot in August 1950, and Plymouth Laira in March 1959. Transferred to Oswestry in May 1960, its final allocation was to Shrewsbury in February 1963.

Withdrawn from British Railways service in November 1965, it was sent to Woodham Brothers scrapyard in Barry, South Wales.

== Preservation ==
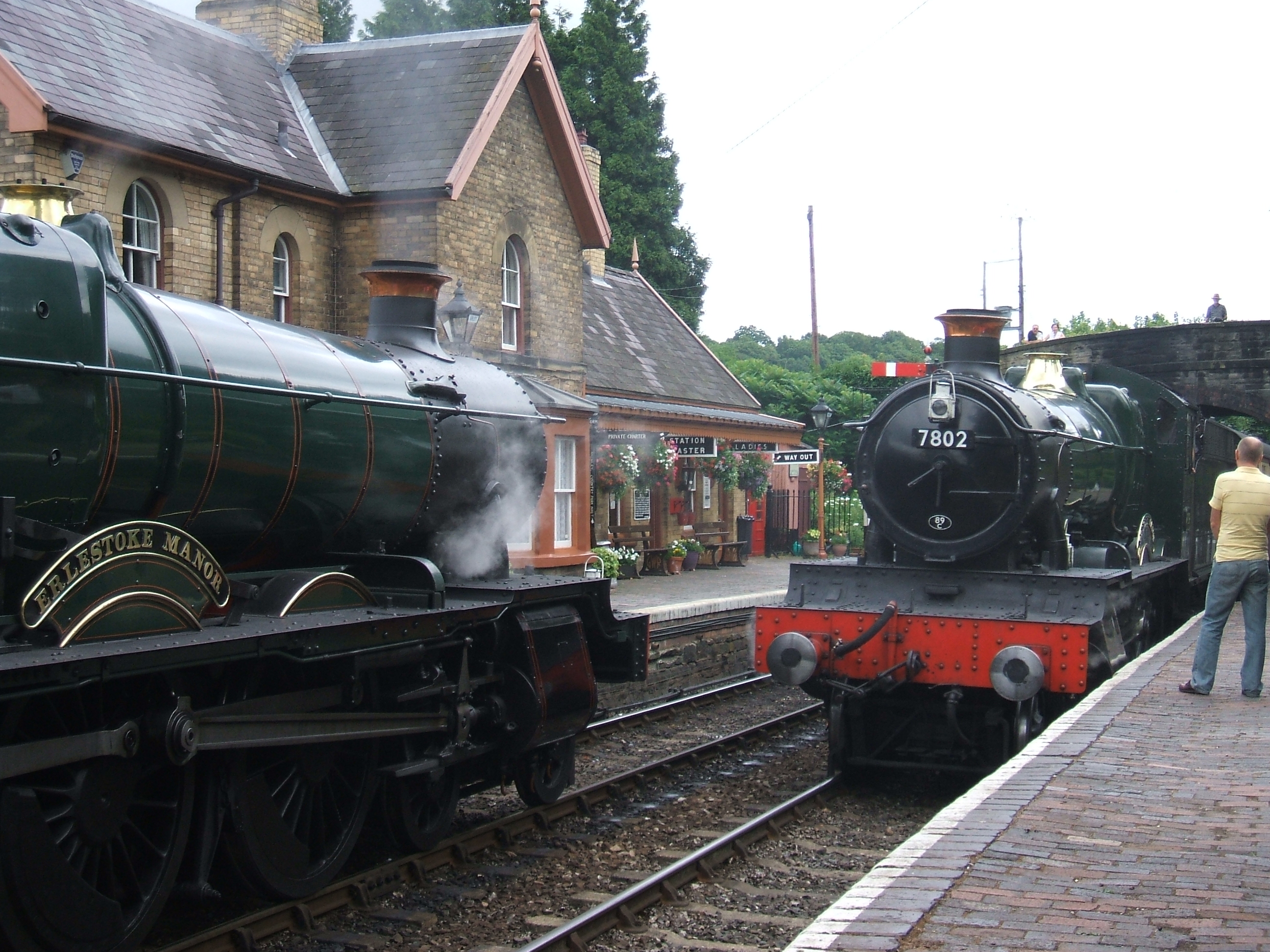
7812 Erlestoke Manor with classmate 7802 Bradley Manor

The locomotive was purchased by the Erlestoke Manor Fund in June 1973. It was moved from Barry to a temporary home at the Dowty Railway Preservation Society, Ashchurch in May 1974, pending an eventual move to the Dean Forest Railway. However in 1976 Fund members approved a move to the Severn Valley Railway instead, where restoration was completed and the locomotive entered service in 1979. Withdrawn in 1985, it returned to service on 12 February 2008, as part of the SVR's anniversary reopening train.

Presently one of three GWR 7800 Manor Class locomotives based at the SVR, the other two being 7802 Bradley Manor (which is also owned by the Erlestoke Manor Fund) and GWR 7819 Hinton Manor. 7812's boiler ticket expired in January 2018, after which the locomotive was moved to Tyseley Locomotive Works for overhaul. It re-entered service in April 2023.

== Olympic Torch run ==
During the 2012 Summer Olympics torch relay for the London 2012 Olympics, 7812 carried the Olympic torch and its bearer Chris Stokes from Bewdley to Kidderminster with a brief stop outside West Midland Safari Park.

== Depot allocations ==
Depot	Allocation Date
Bristol Bath Road	January 1939
Newton Abbot	August 1950
Plymouth Laira	March 1959
Oswestry	May 1960
Shrewsbury	February 1963
Withdrawn (Woodham Brothers)	November 1965
