= Swindon Designer Outlet =

Designer outlet in Swindon, England

Coordinates: 51.56245°N 1.79812°W

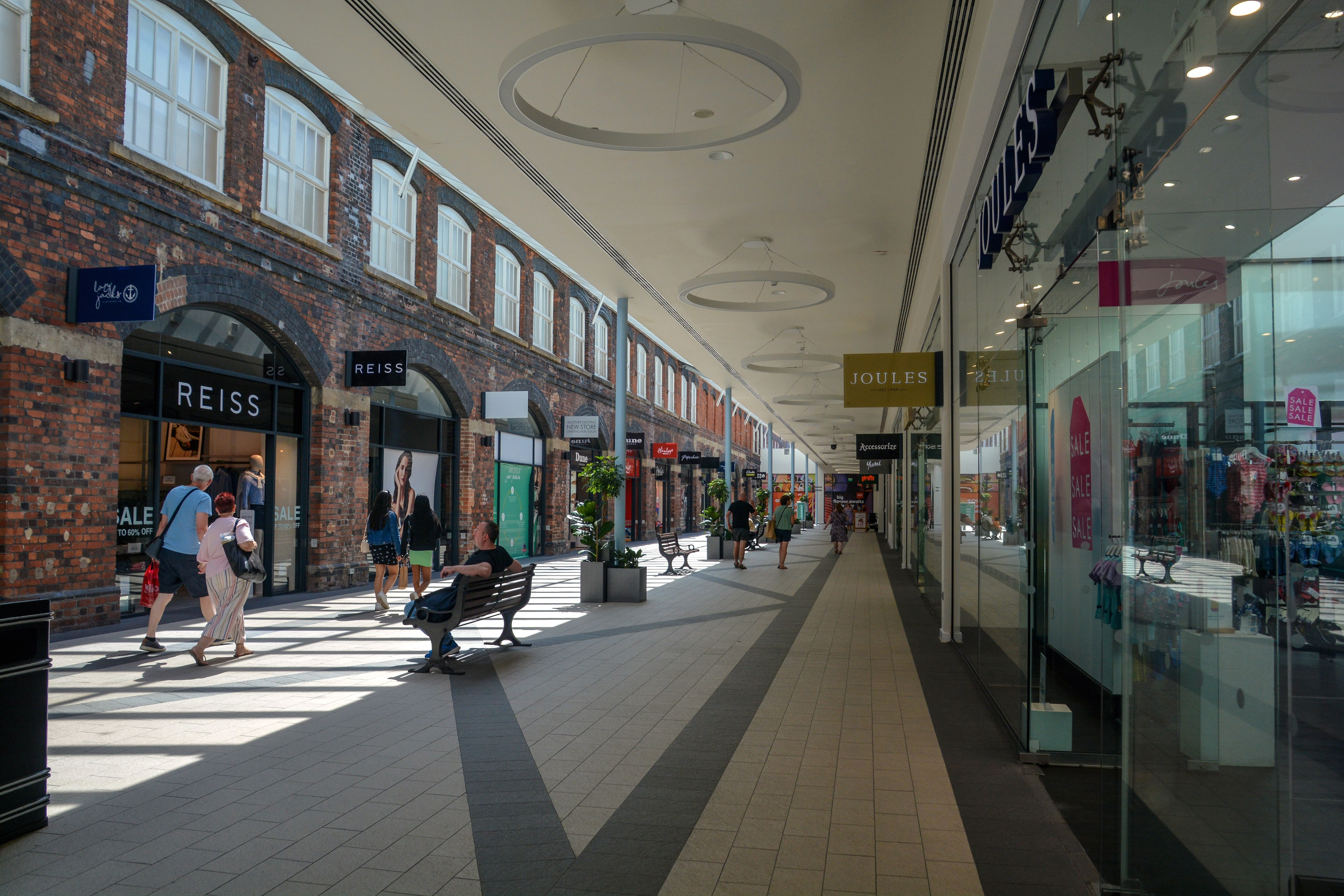
Swindon Designer Outlet, a shopping complex built within the disused Swindon railway engine works

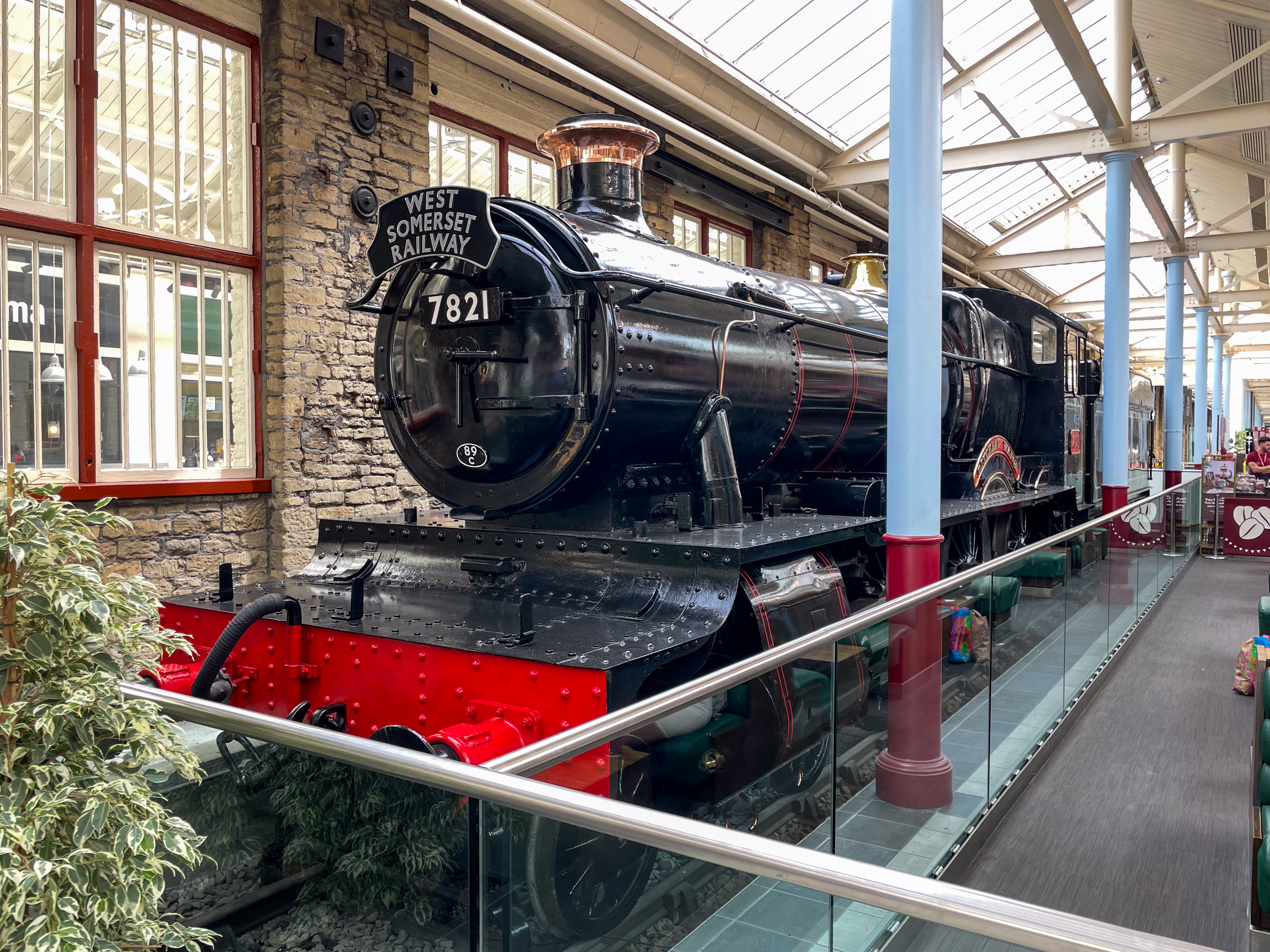
Steam locomotive Ditcheat Manor in the Food Court of the Centre

Swindon Designer Outlet (currently trading as Frasers Plus Designer Outlet Swindon) is a covered designer outlet in Swindon, England, owned by Frasers Group.

The outlet occupies most of the remainder of the Great Western railway works. Converted by Tarmac Construction and opened in March 1997, it is a few miles from junction 16 of the M4 motorway.

In December 2025, LaSalle Investment Management sold the outlet to Frasers Group. It was also previously owned by Nuveen Real Estate from 2008 to 2022.

McArthurGlen Group operated the outlet from opening to January 31, 2026, when the centre's operations were handed to Frasers Group and rebranded under the Frasers Plus brand, the centre is since managed and operated by Savills.

The centre attracts more than 3 million customers annually, putting it in the top 5 outlets in the UK.

== Rail heritage ==
In the eating area, a number of steam locomotives that were built at Swindon Works have been on display:

- 3440 City of Truro from March 1997 until May 1999
- 4930 Hagley Hall from May 1999 until June 2007
- 7819 Hinton Manor from June 2007 until August 2018
- 7821 Ditcheat Manor since August 2018
