= GWR 7800 Class 7808 Cookham Manor =

Preserved British steam locomotive

7808 Cookham Manor
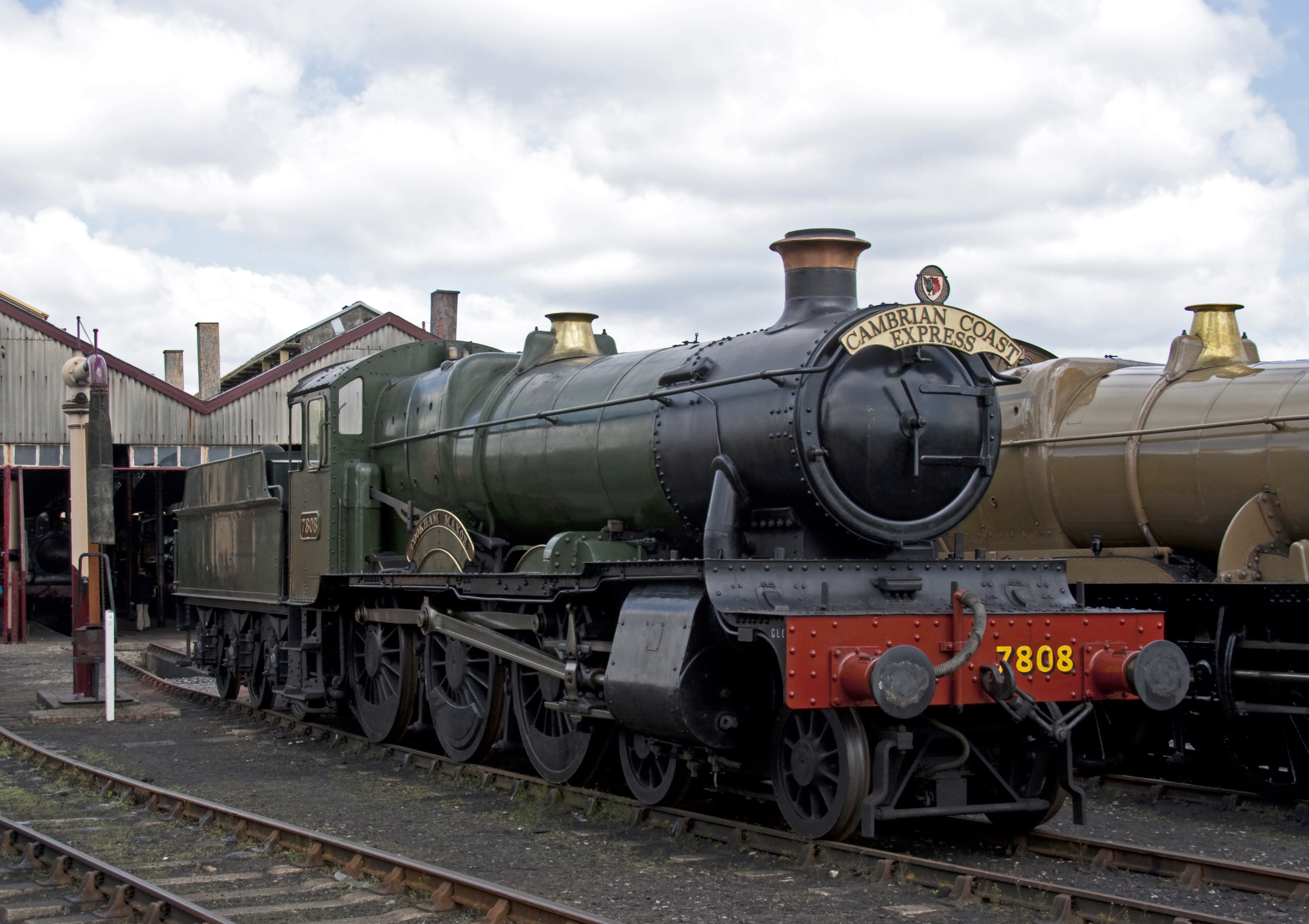
- Cookham Manor
Type and origin
- Power type: Steam
- Build date: March 1938
Specifications
- Configuration
  - Whyte: 4-6-0
  - UIC: 2'Ch2
- Gauge: 4 ft 8 1/2 in (1,435 mm) standard gauge
- Leading dia.: 3 ft 0 in (914 mm)
- Driver dia.: 5 ft 8 in (1,727 mm)
- Minimum curve: 6 chains (396 ft; 121 m) normal, 5 chains (330 ft; 101 m) slow
- Wheelbase: Loco: 27 ft 1 in (8.26 m); Loco & tender: 52 ft 1 3/4 in (15.89 m)
- Length: 61 ft 9 1/4 in (18.83 m)
- Width: 8 ft 11 in (2.718 m)
- Height: 13 ft 0 in (3.962 m)
- Axle load: 17 long tons 5 cwt (38,600 lb or 17.5 t) (19.3 short tons)
- Loco weight: 68 long tons 18 cwt (154,300 lb or 70 t) (77.2 short tons) full
- Tender weight: 40 long tons 0 cwt (89,600 lb or 40.6 t) (44.8 short tons) full
- Fuel type: Coal
- Fuel capacity: 7 long tons 0 cwt (15,700 lb or 7.1 t) (7.8 short tons)
- Water cap.: 3,500 imp gal (16,000 L; 4,200 US gal)
- Firebox
  - Grate area: 22.1 sq ft (2.05 m^{2})
- Boiler: GWR Standard No. 14
- Boiler pressure: 225 psi (1.55 MPa)
- Heating surface
  - Firebox: 140.0 sq ft (13.01 m^{2})
  - Tubes and flues: 1,285.5 sq ft (119.43 m^{2})
- Superheater
  - Heating area: 160.0 sq ft (14.86 m^{2})
- Cylinders: Two, outside
- Cylinder size: 18 in × 30 in (457 mm × 762 mm)
Performance figures
- Tractive effort: 27,340 lbf (121.61 kN)
Career
- Operators: Great Western Railway, British Railways
- Class: 7800 'Manor' Class
- Numbers: 7808
- Retired: December 1965
- Current owner: Great Western Society

7808 Cookham Manor is a Great Western Railway 7800 'Manor' Class steam locomotive. It was built in 1938 at Swindon Works, withdrawn from service in December 1965 and purchased directly from British Railways for preservation by John Mynors, a member of the Great Western Society, in 1965–66. 'Cookham Manor' was the only 'Manor' Class locomotive to have been bought directly from BR. Initially it was stored at Ashchurch, until moving to Didcot in August 1970.

It was said to be considered highly by the crews that operated it, and unusually for the class, the locomotive was fitted with a larger 4,000-imperial-gallon (18,000 L; 4,800 US gal) water tender.

The locomotive cost £3,986 excluding the tender when built in 1938, and had travelled 913,744 miles (1,470,528 km) by 28 December 1963.

== Allocations ==
The allocations of 'Cookham Manor' during its service for the GWR and British Railways.

Date	Location
March 1938	Old Oak Common
April 1939	Gloucester
April 1946	Oswestry
Dec 1953	Bristol (St Philips Marsh)
Dec 1954	Gloucester
June 1959	Newton Abbot
September 1960	Exeter
October 1960	Worcester
December 1960	Tyseley
September 1962	Reading
August 1964	Swindon
November 1964	Gloucester
December 1965	Withdrawn

== Preservation ==
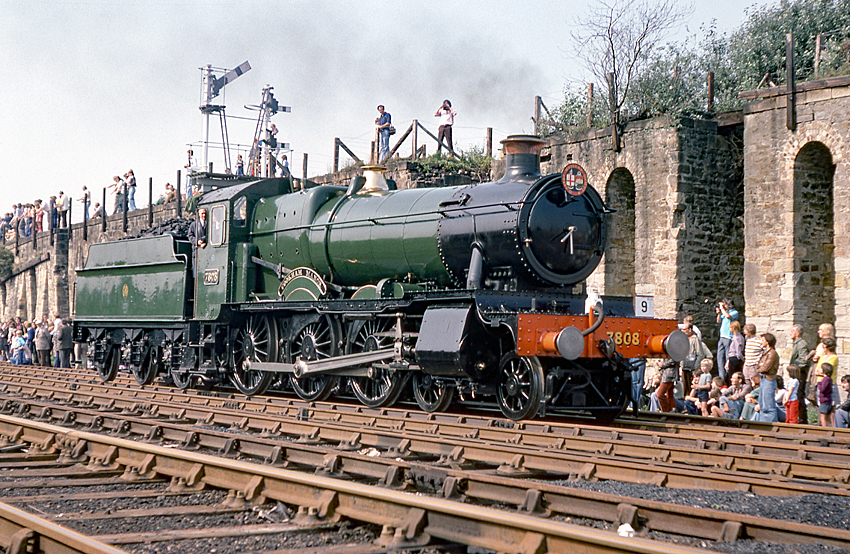
7808 Cookham Manor in the S&D 150 cavalcade

The locomotive initially saw considerable main line use soon after preservation, but is now on static display at Didcot Railway Centre. In 1974, Cookham Manor piloted 6998 Burton Agnes Hall hauling the complete vintage train for the first time. In 1975, it appeared at Shildon for the Stockton and Darlington 150th Anniversary celebrations, along with 4 restored coaches and the society's Siphon G. The latter functioned as a mobile sales stand.
