= GWR 7800 Class =

Class of thirty 4-6-0 locomotives

GWR 7800 "Manor" Class
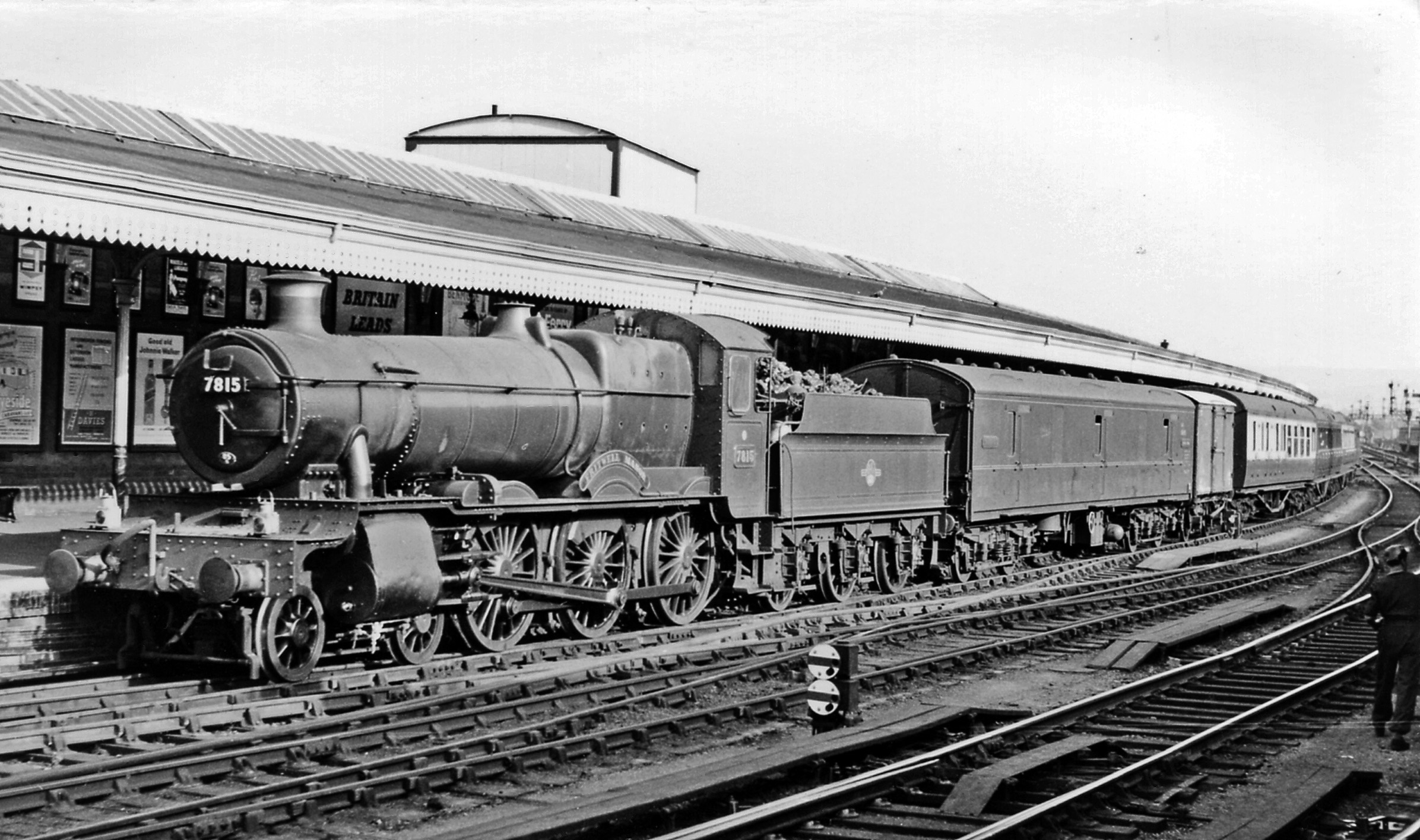
- 7815 Fritwell Manor at Gloucester, October 1959.
Type and origin
- Power type: Steam
- Designer: Charles Collett
- Builder: GWR/BR Swindon Works
- Order number: Lot 316, Lot 377
- Build date: 1938–1939 (7800-7819), 1950 (7820-7829)
- Total produced: 30
Specifications
- Configuration
  - Whyte: 4-6-0
  - UIC: 2'Ch2
- Gauge: 4 ft 8 1/2 in (1,435 mm) standard gauge
- Leading dia.: 3 ft 0 in (914 mm)
- Driver dia.: 5 ft 8 in (1,727 mm)
- Minimum curve: 6 chains (396 ft; 121 m) normal, 5 chains (330 ft; 101 m) slow
- Wheelbase: Loco: 27 ft 1 in (8.26 m); Loco & tender: 52 ft 1 3/4 in (15.89 m)
- Length: 61 ft 9 1/4 in (18.83 m)
- Width: 8 ft 11 in (2.718 m)
- Height: 13 ft 0 in (3.962 m)
- Axle load: 17 long tons 5 cwt (38,600 lb or 17.5 t) (19.3 short tons)
- Loco weight: 68 long tons 18 cwt (154,300 lb or 70 t) (77.2 short tons) full
- Tender weight: 40 long tons 0 cwt (89,600 lb or 40.6 t) (44.8 short tons) full
- Fuel type: Coal
- Fuel capacity: 7 long tons 0 cwt (15,700 lb or 7.1 t) (7.8 short tons)
- Water cap.: 3,500 imp gal (16,000 L; 4,200 US gal)
- Firebox
  - Grate area: 22.1 sq ft (2.05 m^{2})
- Boiler: GWR Standard No. 14
- Boiler pressure: 225 psi (1.55 MPa)
- Heating surface
  - Firebox: 140.0 sq ft (13.01 m^{2})
  - Tubes and flues: 1,285.5 sq ft (119.43 m^{2})
- Superheater
  - Heating area: 160.0 sq ft (14.86 m^{2})
- Cylinders: Two, outside
- Cylinder size: 18 in × 30 in (457 mm × 762 mm)
Performance figures
- Tractive effort: 27,340 lbf (121.61 kN)
Career
- Operators: Great Western Railway; British Railways
- Class: GWR: 7800 "Manor"
- Power class: GWR: D BR: 5MT
- Number in class: 30
- Axle load class: GWR: Blue
- Retired: April 1963 – December 1965
- Disposition: 21 scrapped, 9 preserved

The Great Western Railway (GWR) 7800 Class or Manor Class is a class of 4-6-0 type steam locomotives. They were designed as a lighter version of the Grange Class, giving them a wider Route Availability. Like the 'Granges', the 'Manors' used parts from the GWR 4300 Class Moguls but just on the first batch of twenty. Twenty were built between 1938 and 1939, with British Railways adding a further 10 in 1950. They were named after Manors in the area covered by the Great Western Railway. Nine are preserved.

== Background ==
Although successful mixed-traffic designs, neither the Hall nor the Grange 4-6-0 classes were able to cover the full range of duties previously undertaken by the 4300 Class 2-6-0 locomotives due to their ‘red’ weight classification. By the late 1930s a lighter version of the Grange class was urgently required for those cross-country and branch line duties forbidden to heavier locomotives. A new lighter (Swindon No.14) boiler was therefore designed, and as with the Grange Class, the driving wheels and motion components were recovered from withdrawn members of the 4300 Class. The Manor class, with an axle loading of just over 17 tons, could be utilised on many lines from which the heavier Granges were barred.

A Gwr Manor At Guilford Station

== Building ==
The first of the Manors No.7800 Torquay Manor was built at Swindon Works and entered traffic in January 1938. By February 1939 twenty were in service but the outbreak of World War II forced the cancellation of construction of a further batch of twenty locomotives. However, after nationalization, the newly created Western Region of British Railways was authorized to build ten more of the class. Nos. 7820–29 at Swindon in November and December 1950. A batch of ten more locomotives was planned to be released, but the batch was cancelled for unknown reasons. The cancelled locomotives were 7830 Norton Manor, 7831 Ogwell Manor, 7832 Pimley Manor, 7833 Ramsbury Manor, 7834 Rodley Manor, 7835 Standen Manor, 7836 Sutton Manor, 7837 Thorton Manor, 7838 Widford Manor, and 7839 Wilcote Manor.

== Performance ==
Unlike the Granges of 1936 where the use of a standard design and the re-use of existing components had produced a masterpiece, the initial performance of the Manors was comparatively mediocre, exhibiting poor steaming rates and high fuel consumption. "Were it not for the constraints of war there is every reason to expect that Swindon would have recalled the engines for modifications."

It was not until after nationalisation that the Western Region of British Railways sanctioned investigation into the class' shortcomings. In 1951 comparative trials were made between 7818 Granville Manor and a new BR Standard Class 4 4-6-0, which was built at Swindon and fulfilled a similar brief to the Manor class but was designed at the Brighton works under Robert Riddles. This revealed that the front end of the Manor restricted both steam flow and draught on the fire, with the blastpipe being too large in relation to the size of the chimney. The blastpipe's area was reduced by a quarter, while a new design of firebar increased the air space in the grate, allowing more efficient combustion.

These changes doubled the practical steaming rate of the No.14 boiler. A programme of alterations was implemented across the class during 1952, and the Manors started to perform in a similar fashion to the Grange and Hall classes. They were given the same power classification as those types - 5MT.

== Operations ==
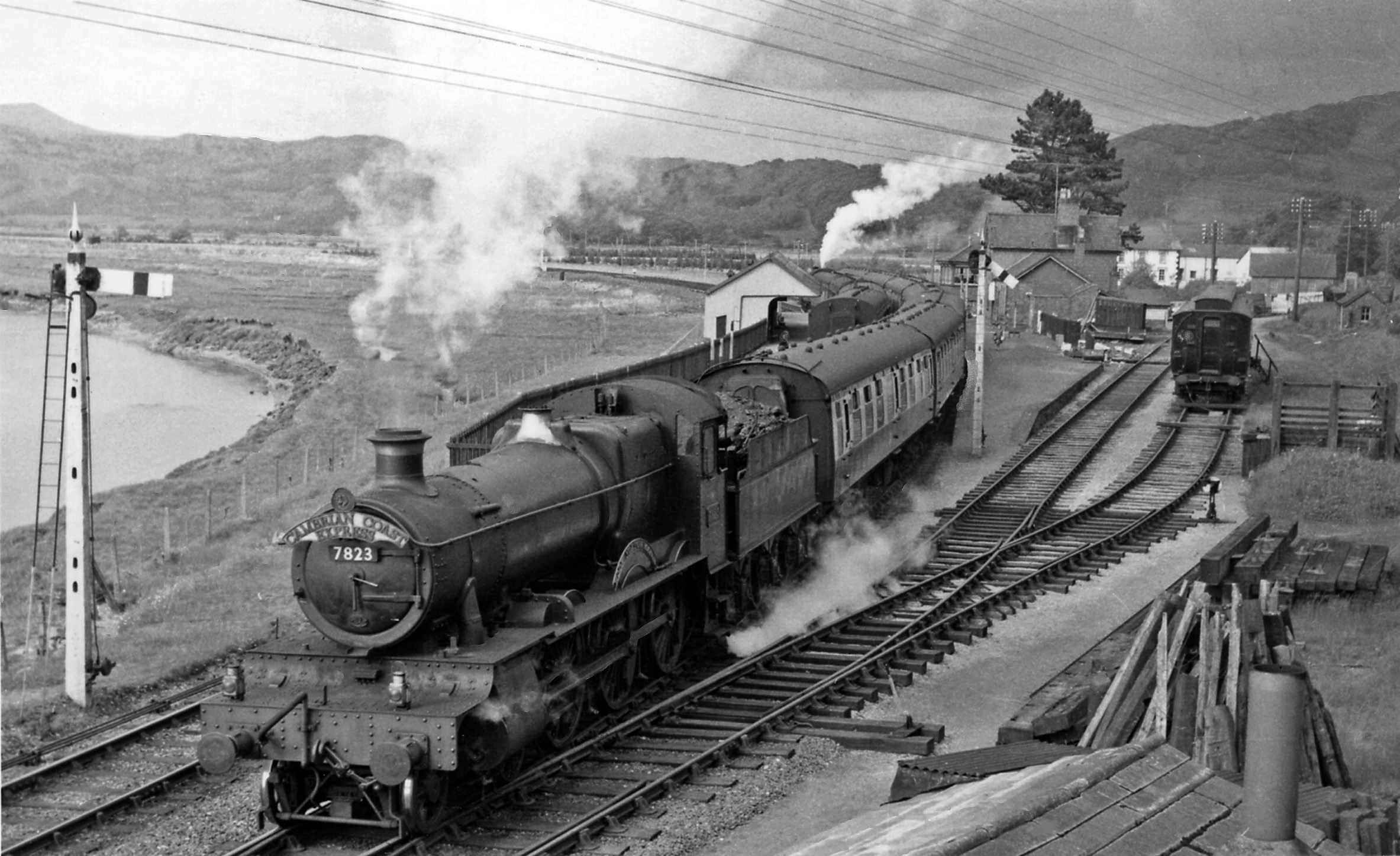
BR (W) 7823 pulling the Cambrian Coast Express at Glandyfi.

The first examples were despatched to depots at Wolverhampton, Bristol, Gloucester, Shrewsbury, Westbury in Wiltshire and Neyland in South Wales. In October 1938 No.7805 Broome Manor underwent clearance tests between Ruabon and Barmouth. Subsequently, the class were used over the main lines of the erstwhile Cambrian Railways, with its headquarters and works in Oswestry. The Manors were also successfully employed in the West Country where they were used for banking and piloting trains over the Devon banks between Newton Abbot and Plymouth. Their light axleloading also allowed them across the Tamar Bridge and on to the branch lines of Cornwall.

By 1959 twenty-one Manors were congregated in Mid- and South Wales. Their most prestigious working was the Cambrian Coast Express, where a Manor took over from a King or Castle at Shrewsbury and worked through to Aberystwyth. Others of the class operated in the Birmingham, Gloucester and Hereford areas while the handful stationed at Reading frequently ventured on to the Southern Region line to Guildford and Redhill.

== Withdrawal ==
The first Manor to be withdrawn was No.7809 Childrey Manor, of Shrewsbury depot in April 1963 and which was cut up at Swindon. By May 1965 the numbers had been halved and the final two in service, No.7808 Cookham Manor of Gloucester, and No.7829 Ramsbury Manor of Didcot, were condemned in December 1965. Remarkably, for a relatively small class where thirty engines were built, nine examples have been preserved. The nine preserved examples were all withdrawn from British Railways service during 1965.

Table of withdrawals
| Year | Quantity in service at start of year | Number withdrawn | Quantity withdrawn | Locomotive numbers | Notes |
|---|---|---|---|---|---|
| 1963 | 30 | 1 | 1 | 7809. | |
| 1964 | 29 | 12 | 13 | 7800/05–07/10/15–17/23–25. | |
| 1965 | 17 | 17 | 30 | 7801–04/08/11–14/18–22/26–29. | 7802, 7808, 7812, 7819, 7820, 7821, 7822, 7827 & 7828 Preserved |

== Preservation ==
=== Operation in preservation ===
Nine Manors survived into preservation, four GWR examples and five BR. 7808 Cookham Manor was purchased directly from BR service by the Great Western Society, with the rest saved from Barry Scrapyard. 7827 Lydham Manor was the first to be rescued in June 1970, the fifth departure from Barry, and 7828 Odney Manor the last to be rescued in June 1981, the 133rd departure.

All nine Manors have operated in preservation, with the four GWR-built locos all having seen main line operation: 7802 Bradley Manor, 7808 Cookham Manor, 7812 Erlestoke Manor and 7819 Hinton Manor.

In the 1970s, 7808 Cookham Manor was used by the Great Western Society (GWS) to haul nine vintage ex-GWR carriages on an annual outing on the main line from Didcot to Birmingham. Today 7808 is on static display inside the GWS shed at Didcot, awaiting an overhaul.

7812 Erlestoke Manor worked a small number of railtours between April and June 1982. Also certified for main line operation in the 1980s was fellow SVR-based engine 7819. It worked a number of railtours along former Great Western routes including the Cambrian Coast Line and played a big part in the 150th anniversary of the GWR in 1985. 7812 was until New Year's Eve 2017 operational on the SVR but wasn't main line certified. 7819 Hinton Manor was until August 2018 on static display in Swindon, and is now on display inside The Engine House awaiting an overhaul.

In 2007, 7802 Bradley Manor was the last member of the class to operate on the national network, following the requirement to fit OTMR. Its last overhaul was completed in November 2015, however it was not certified to operate on the main line.

None of the BR-built Manors have operated on the main line in preservation.

=== Locomotives ===
See: List of GWR 7800 Class locomotives for all Manor locomotives built. Nine locomotives have been preserved:

| Number | Name | Built | Withdrawn | Base | Current location | Owner | Status | Livery | Photo | Notes |
|---|---|---|---|---|---|---|---|---|---|---|
| 7802 | Bradley Manor | January 1938 | November 1965 | Severn Valley Railway | Tyseley Locomotive Works | Erlestoke Manor Fund | Operational, boiler ticket expires: 2032 | BR Lined Green, Late Crest | | Moved to Tyseley in July 2019 following broken piston rod suffered while on loan to the WSR |
| 7808 | Cookham Manor | March 1938 | December 1965 | Didcot Railway Centre | Didcot Railway Centre | Great Western Society | Static Display | GWR Unlined Green, Shirtbutton Logo | | Final member of class to be withdrawn from service by BR |
| 7812 | Erlestoke Manor | January 1939 | November 1965 | Severn Valley Railway | Severn Valley Railway | Erlestoke Manor Fund | Operational, boiler ticket expires: 2032 | BR Lined Green, Late Crest | | Operational on hire to West Somerset Railway in 2023 |
| 7819 | Hinton Manor | February 1939 | November 1965 | Severn Valley Railway | Severn Valley Railway | Severn Valley Railway Charitable Trust | Static Display | GWR Unlined Green, Shirtbutton Logo | | On display in The Engine House awaiting its turn for overhaul |
| 7820 | Dinmore Manor | November 1950 | November 1965 | Gloucestershire Warwickshire Railway | Gloucestershire Warwickshire Railway | Dinmore Manor Locomotive Ltd. | Static display | BR Lined Black, Early Emblem (Red Nameplates) | | Boiler ticket ended in January 2025. |
| 7821 | Ditcheat Manor | November 1950 | November 1965 | West Somerset Railway | Swindon Designer Outlet | West Somerset Railway Association | Static Display | BR Lined Black, Early Emblem (Red Nameplates) | | |
| 7822 | Foxcote Manor | December 1950 | November 1965 | West Somerset Railway | Tyseley Locomotive Works | Foxcote Manor Society | Under overhaul | BR Unlined Black, Early emblem (Red Nameplates) | | Withdrawn from traffic following failure of copper welds inside firebox. |
| 7827 | Lydham Manor | December 1950 | October 1965 | Dartmouth Steam Railway | Dartmouth Steam Railway | Dart Valley Railway plc | Operational, boiler ticket expires: 2033 | BR Lined Green, Late Crest | | Returned to traffic in October 2023 following completion of overhaul outshopped in BR lined green for the first time in preservation. |
| 7828 | Odney Manor | December 1950 | October 1965 | West Somerset Railway | West Somerset Railway | West Somerset Railway | Operational, boiler ticket expires: 2028 | BR Lined Green, Late Emblem | | Returned to service in December 2018 following repairs |

== Model railways ==
Mainline Railways had OO gauge Manor Class models in their catalogue in 1983, with a model of Cookham Manor in GWR green and a retooled model of Lydham Manor in BR lined green. Mainline's tooling was later used by Bachmann Branchline, but is not currently in production. Both Dapol and Accurascale released 00 gauge renditions of the 78xx in Autumn of 2022.

== See also ==
- List of GWR standard classes with two outside cylinders
