= GWR 7800 Class 7802 Bradley Manor =

Preserved 4-6-0 British steam locomotive

7802 Bradley Manor
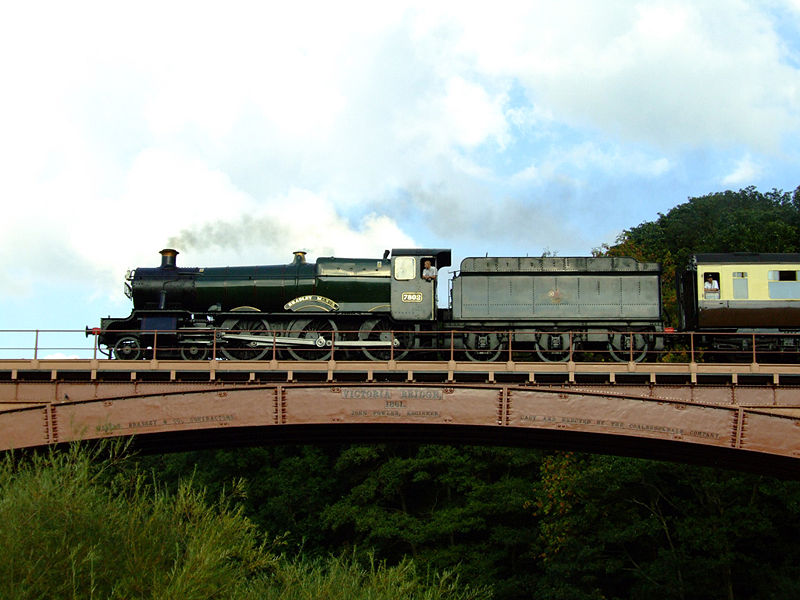
- 7802 Bradley Manor crossing Victoria Bridge.
Type and origin
- Power type: Steam
- Build date: January 1938
Specifications
- Configuration
  - Whyte: 4-6-0
  - UIC: 2'Ch2
- Gauge: 4 ft 8 1/2 in (1,435 mm) standard gauge
- Leading dia.: 3 ft 0 in (914 mm)
- Driver dia.: 5 ft 8 in (1,727 mm)
- Minimum curve: 6 chains (396 ft; 121 m) normal, 5 chains (330 ft; 101 m) slow
- Wheelbase: Loco: 27 ft 1 in (8.26 m); Loco & tender: 52 ft 1 3/4 in (15.89 m)
- Length: 61 ft 9 1/4 in (18.83 m)
- Width: 8 ft 11 in (2.718 m)
- Height: 13 ft 0 in (3.962 m)
- Axle load: 17 long tons 5 cwt (38,600 lb or 17.5 t) (19.3 short tons)
- Loco weight: 68 long tons 18 cwt (154,300 lb or 70 t) (77.2 short tons) full
- Tender weight: 40 long tons 0 cwt (89,600 lb or 40.6 t) (44.8 short tons) full
- Fuel type: Coal
- Fuel capacity: 7 long tons 0 cwt (15,700 lb or 7.1 t) (7.8 short tons)
- Water cap.: 3,500 imp gal (16,000 L; 4,200 US gal)
- Firebox
  - Grate area: 22.1 sq ft (2.05 m^{2})
- Boiler: GWR Standard No. 14
- Boiler pressure: 225 psi (1.55 MPa)
- Heating surface
  - Firebox: 140.0 sq ft (13.01 m^{2})
  - Tubes and flues: 1,285.5 sq ft (119.43 m^{2})
- Superheater
  - Heating area: 160.0 sq ft (14.86 m^{2})
- Cylinders: Two, outside
- Cylinder size: 18 in × 30 in (457 mm × 762 mm)
Performance figures
- Tractive effort: 27,340 lbf (121.61 kN)
Career
- Operators: Great Western Railway, British Railways
- Class: 7800 'Manor' Class
- Numbers: 7802
- Retired: November 1965
- Current owner: Erlestoke Manor Fund

7802 Bradley Manor is a 7800 'Manor' Class 4-6-0 steam locomotive. Built by the Great Western Railway at its Swindon Works in January 1938 it had an operating life of 27 years being withdrawn in November 1965. Designed by Charles Collett, it is one of nine of the class to be preserved and is currently based on the Severn Valley Railway.

== Service ==
After leaving Swindon, it was sent to Old Oak Common TMD, being transferred to Bristol Bath Road TMD in 1939. Like most of its class, it eventually ended up on the Cambrian section, arriving at Machynlleth in 1946, where it stayed until its final transfer to Shrewsbury in 1964. Withdrawn from service in November 1965, it was sent to Woodham Brothers scrapyard in July 1966.

== Preservation ==
It was rescued from Barry in 1979 by the 'Erlestoke Manor Fund' based at the Severn Valley Railway originally as spare parts for 7812 Erlestoke Manor. However the owners had a change of heart and in 1983 the decision was taken to return 7802 to steam. This was accomplished in 1993 and since then has given excellent service on the Severn Valley Railway, West Somerset Railway and on various main line excursions.

Bradley Manor was withdrawn for overhaul in August 2000, and to help speed up the process it was given the boiler of preserved classmate Erlestoke Manor which was already partially restored. The work on Bradley Manor continued with it first moving under its own steam on 12 March 2002 and entering service for the Severn Valley Railway later in the year. It completed over 9,000 miles during the 2000 season with almost continuous daily service. In 2005, 7802 was featured in the Disney movie The Chronicles of Narnia: The Lion, The Witch, and The Wardrobe, in the scenes passing through the countryside.

The summer of 2003 saw Bradley Manor haul a number of trains in August under the name Torbay Express. Promoted by Past-Time Rail, the itinerary was Bristol Temple Meads to Kingswear and return. The originally planned four trains were so popular a fifth was added in September. Bradley Manor developed a hot axle box on the first run on 10 August and so was unable to haul the next two outings which saw 5051 Earl Bathurst step in. However Bradley Manor returned for the 31 August and 7 September trips. On commenting about the success of the Torbay Express, Past-Time Rail director Andy Staite said that "Bradley Manor was the 'right' motive power for the line - Newton Abbot shed had 'Manors' in steam days and they were a familiar sight on the South Devon Coast route."

In April 2007 new Network Rail standards were introduced requiring all preserved steam locomotives to be fitted with On-train monitoring recorders (OTMR) before they could run on the main line. So halfway through its latest main line certificate the owners decided the cost of returning 7812 Erlestoke Manor to steam and fitting OTMR to 7802 was just too much. Bradley Manor did receive a stay of execution and could run on the main line until the end of 2007, after which, it was restricted to heritage railway use only, running up to February 2011, when issues with the boiler saw it withdrawn for overhaul early, though work on a further overhaul started almost immediately.

In November 2015, 7802 re-entered traffic after an overhaul shared between Bridgnorth works and Tyseley locomotive works. A new 3500 gallon Churchward tender is being built at Tyseley which will eventually replace the 4000 gallon Collett tender used by 7802 in preservation. In March 2018 7802 was paired with 3500 gallon Churchward tender T2334 from 7812 Erlestoke Manor following the latter's withdrawal for overhaul.

Agreement was reached in May 2019 to send 7802 to the West Somerset Railway until early October 2019, with 6960 Raveningham Hall coming to the SVR for at least a similar period. The swap was necessitated by an axle-weight restricted by the West Somerset Railway on its locomotives with the GWR 6959 Class Raveningham Hall being too heavy. 7802 suffered a broken piston rod in July 2019 and was moved to Tyseley Locomotive Works on 30 July 2019 for overhaul. The locomotive returned to the SVR for running in and testing in January 2025, temporarily paired with the tender from 2-8-0 2857.

== Allocations ==
The location of 7802 Bradley Manor on particular dates.

First shed	Old Oak Common
August 1939	Bristol Bath Road
April 1946	Machynlleth
February 1954	Shrewsbury
Last Shed	Shrewsbury
Withdrawn	November 1965
