= GWR 7800 Class 7828 Odney Manor =

Preserved British steam locomotive

Great Western Railway 7828 "Odney Manor"
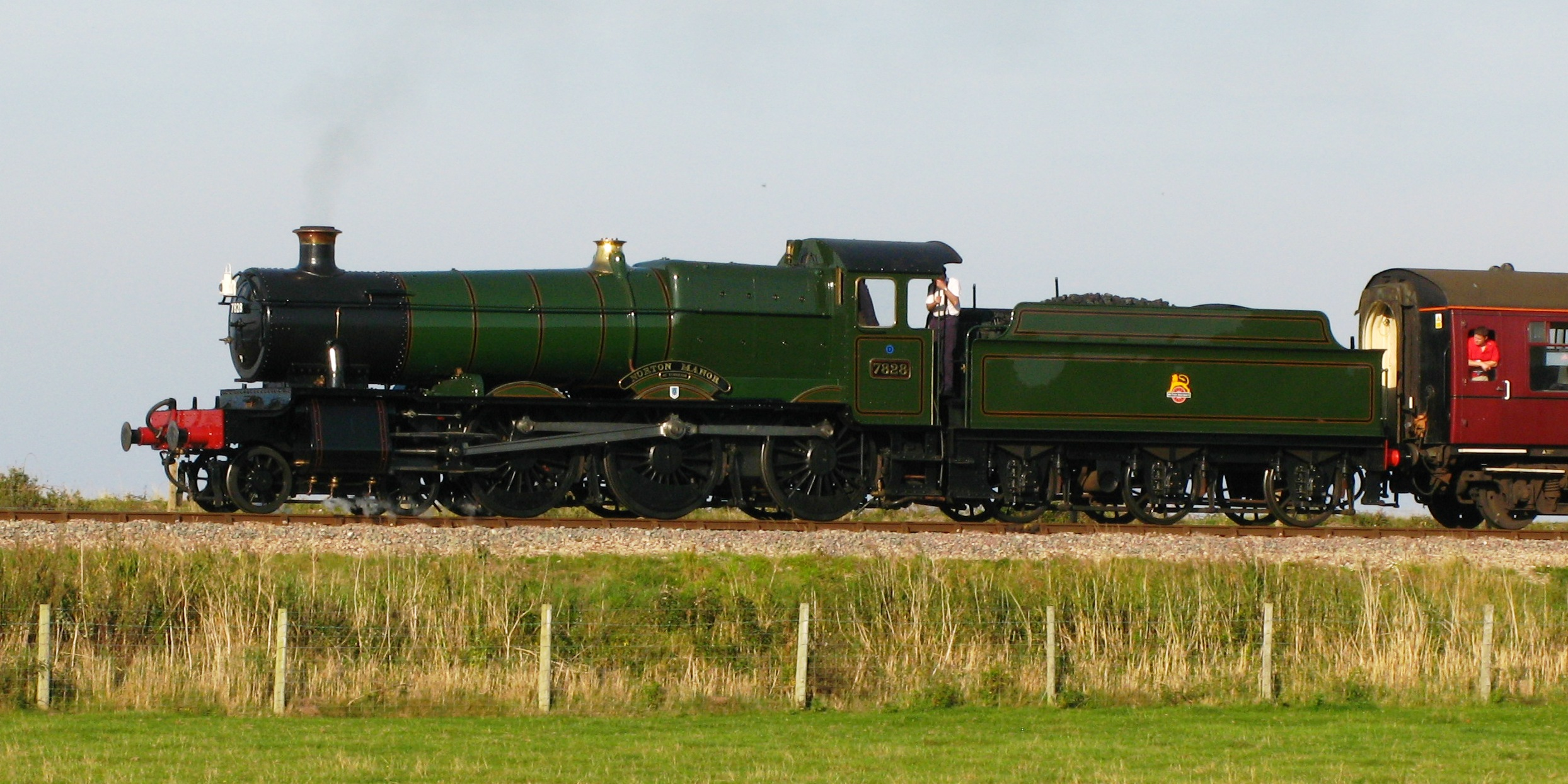
- 7828 near Blue Anchor
Type and origin
- Power type: Steam
- Build date: December 1950
Specifications
- Configuration
  - Whyte: 4-6-0
  - UIC: 2'Ch2
- Gauge: 4 ft 8 1/2 in (1,435 mm) standard gauge
- Leading dia.: 3 ft 0 in (914 mm)
- Driver dia.: 5 ft 8 in (1,727 mm)
- Minimum curve: 6 chains (396 ft; 121 m) normal, 5 chains (330 ft; 101 m) slow
- Wheelbase: Loco: 27 ft 1 in (8.26 m); Loco & tender: 52 ft 1 3/4 in (15.89 m)
- Length: 61 ft 9 1/4 in (18.83 m)
- Width: 8 ft 11 in (2.718 m)
- Height: 13 ft 0 in (3.962 m)
- Axle load: 17 long tons 5 cwt (38,600 lb or 17.5 t) (19.3 short tons)
- Loco weight: 68 long tons 18 cwt (154,300 lb or 70 t) (77.2 short tons) full
- Tender weight: 40 long tons 0 cwt (89,600 lb or 40.6 t) (44.8 short tons) full
- Fuel type: Coal
- Fuel capacity: 7 long tons 0 cwt (15,700 lb or 7.1 t) (7.8 short tons)
- Water cap.: 3,500 imp gal (16,000 L; 4,200 US gal)
- Firebox
  - Grate area: 22.1 sq ft (2.05 m^{2})
- Boiler: GWR Standard No. 14
- Boiler pressure: 225 psi (1.55 MPa)
- Heating surface
  - Firebox: 140.0 sq ft (13.01 m^{2})
  - Tubes and flues: 1,285.5 sq ft (119.43 m^{2})
- Superheater
  - Heating area: 160.0 sq ft (14.86 m^{2})
- Cylinders: Two, outside
- Cylinder size: 18 in × 30 in (457 mm × 762 mm)
Performance figures
- Tractive effort: 27,340 lbf (121.61 kN)
Career
- Operators: Great Western Railway; → British Railways, West Somerset Railway
- Class: 7800 Manor Class
- Numbers: 7828
- Nicknames: Odney Manor, Norton Manor
- Withdrawn: 1965
- Restored: 1987
- Current owner: West Somerset Railway
- Disposition: Preserved

7828 Odney Manor is a Great Western Railway locomotive part of the Manor Class. It is one of 9 locomotives preserved from the class which originally had 30. Built by British Railways in 1950 it was withdrawn from service in 1965 before being moved to Woodham Brothers scrapyard in Barry, South Wales. Since 2004 it has been owned by the West Somerset Railway, being based there since 1995. In 2011 the locomotive was temporarily renamed Norton Manor in honour of the local Marine Base near the West Somerset Railway.

== History ==
7828 Odney Manor was first sent to Shrewsbury shed and spent nine years there. 1961 saw it move to Croes Newydd, then two years later it found its way to Aberystwyth for a short while before returning to Shrewsbury, from where it was withdrawn in 1965, moving to Barry in 1966. It stayed at Barry for 15 years.

== Preservation ==
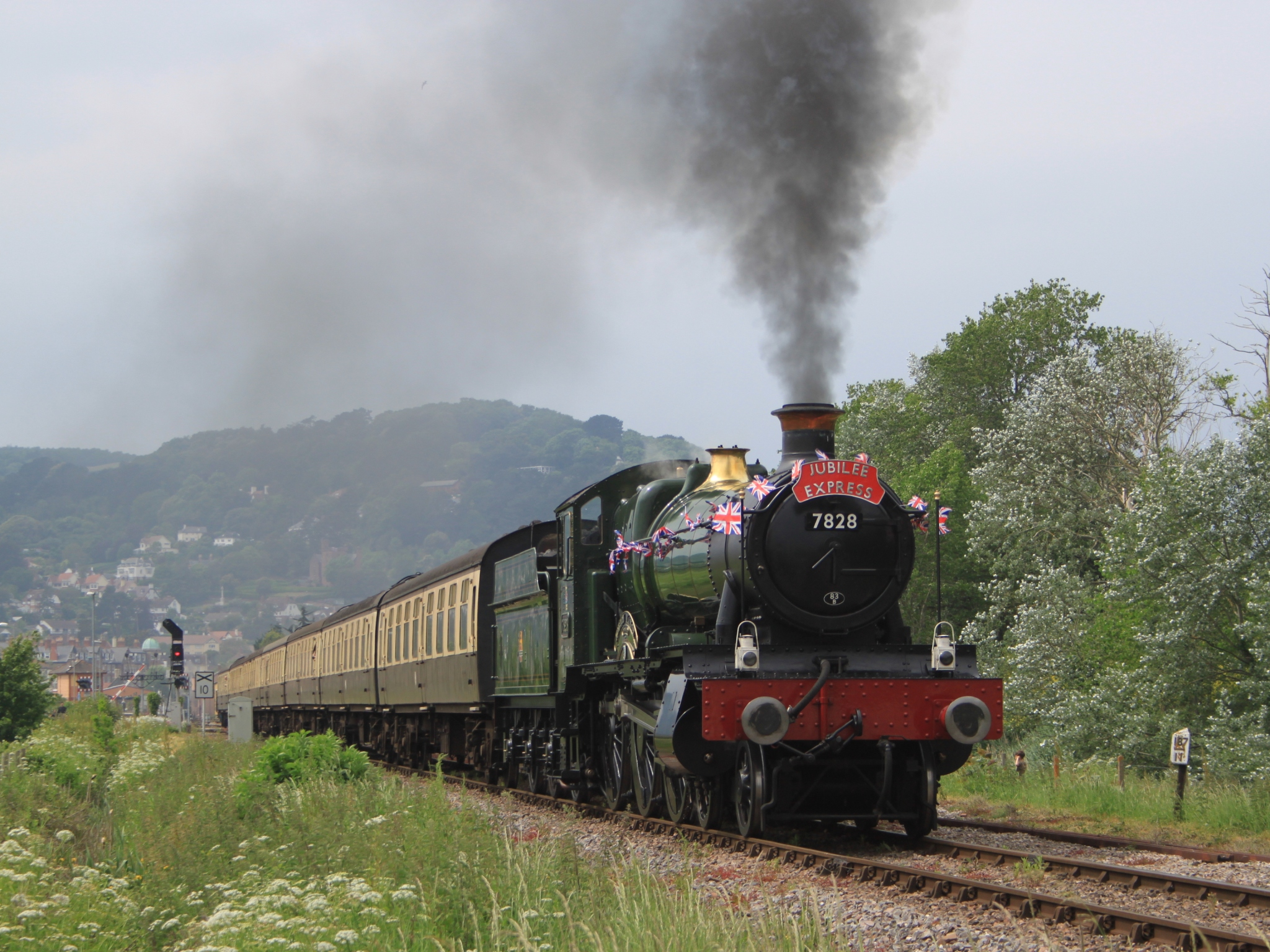
Leaving Minehead on the West Somerset Railway

It was rescued from Barry privately in 1981 and moved to the Gloucestershire Warwickshire Railway where restoration was completed by 1987. It worked on the Gwilli Railway, Llangollen Railway and East Lancashire Railway before coming to the West Somerset Railway (WSR) in 1995. Its owners sold it to the WSR in 2004.

On 17 June 2011 it was temporarily renamed Norton Manor after 40 Commando's base alongside the railway at Norton Fitzwarren. Originally, the Great Western Railway had intended to give the name Norton Manor to new locomotive number 7830, but the order for this locomotive was cancelled. 7828 has been repainted in the BR lined green livery and it regained its Odney Manor nameplates.
