= GWR 7800 Class 7819 Hinton Manor =

Preserved British steam locomotive

7819 Hinton Manor
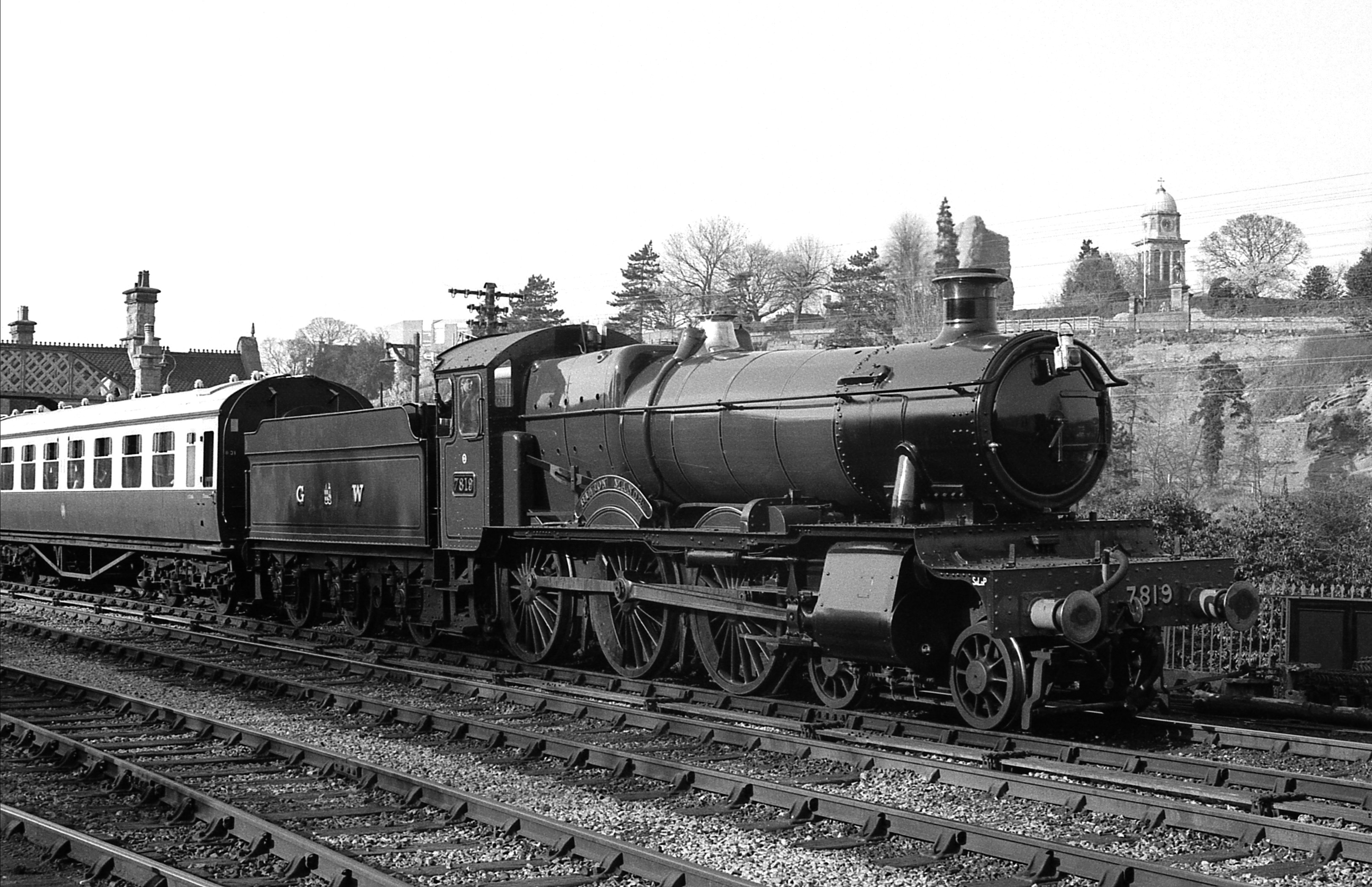
- 7819 Hinton Manor at Bridgnorth
Type and origin
- Power type: Steam
- Build date: February 1939
Specifications
- Gauge: 4 ft 8 1/2 in (1,435 mm)
Career
- Operators: Great Western Railway, British Railways
- Class: 7800 'Manor' Class
- Numbers: 7819
- Withdrawn: November 1965

7819 Hinton Manor is a Great Western Railway locomotive part of the Manor Class. It is one of 9 locomotives preserved from the class which originally had 30.

== Service ==
7819 was built by the Great Western Railway in 1939 and was initially allocated to Carmarthen before moving to Oswestry in 1943. It regularly worked the Cambrian Coast Expresses in the 1960s until being withdrawn from service in November 1965 and moved to Woodham Brothers scrapyard in Barry, Vale of Glamorgan, South Wales.

== Preservation ==
7819 was acquired from Barry in 1973 by the Hinton Manor Fund with help from the Severn Valley Railway Company. Following restoration it entered service in 1977 and also appeared on the main line hauling a number of trains, including the 1987 Cardigan Bay Express season. 7819 Was one of the Severn Valley residents which saw regular use on the mainline in 1985 during the 150th anniversary of the Great Western Railway. The first railtour it worked during the anniversary year being "The Great Western Limited" on 7 Apr, the trip was to see 7819 double heading with 6000 King George V which was being steam worked from Bristol to Plymouth with 7819 coupled behind 6000.

Approaching Taunton the king had suffered a hotbox and needed to be removed from the train leaving 7819 to haul the 13 coach train alone to Plymouth with two class 37's assisting the manor from Taunton to Tiverton Jcn. 7819 would then take the train alone but on arrival in Exeter 7819 was then discovered to have also run a hotbox and needed to be removed from the train with a set of diesels working the train onwards to Plymouth. After being repaired 7819 then moved to Plymouth overnight to work a Plymouth to Bristol bound "Great Western Limited" on 8 Apr where it now double headed with a hastily summoned 4930 Hagley Hall which had travelled overnight from the Severn Valley Railway to work the tour. The engine would also in later years work a number of trains over the Cambrian Coast Line to Barmouth & Pwllheli.

It was last steamed at the end of 1994 and then placed in storage awaiting overhaul. After cosmetic restoration, it replaced Hall Class 4-6-0 No. 4930 Hagley Hall as a static exhibit at the Swindon Designer Outlet in 2007. It returned to the SVR in August 2018 and in March 2019 was moved into The Engine House at Highley. In March 2026 it was moved to the Vale of Rheidol Railway for a two-year loan period to be displayed in their museum. Ownership of the locomotive was transferred to the Severn Valley Railway Charitable Trust in 2004.

== Allocations ==
First shed Feb 1939	31 Dec 1947	Aug 1950	March 1959	May 1965	Last Shed
Carmarthen	Whitchurch	Oswestry	Oswestry	Shrewsbury	Shrewsbury
