= Abney-Hastings baronets =

Extinct baronetcy in the Baronetage of the United Kingdom

Escutcheon of the Abney-Hastings baronets of Willesley Hall

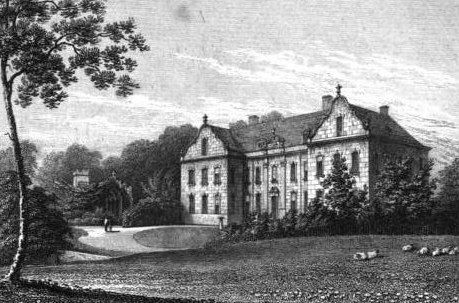
Willesley Hall, seat of the Abney, and, Abney-Hastings family.

The Hastings, later Abney-Hastings Baronetcy, of Willesley Hall in the County of Derby, was a title in the Baronetage of the United Kingdom. It was created on 28 February 1806 for the soldier Sir Charles Hastings. He was the illegitimate son of Francis Hastings, 10th Earl of Huntingdon (see Earl of Huntingdon for earlier history of the family). Hastings married Parnel Abney, daughter and heiress of Thomas Abney, of Willesley Hall, Willesley, Derbyshire, and granddaughter of Sir Thomas Abney, Justice of the Common Pleas. He was succeeded by his eldest son, Charles, the second Baronet, who assumed, by Royal Licence dated 1 December 1823, the additional surname of Abney, before that of Hastings, on succeeding to the Abney estates through his mother. Abney-Hastings represented Leicester in Parliament between 1826 and 1831. The title became extinct on his death in 1858. Abney-Hastings's Blackfordby and Packington estates passed to his kinsman Henry Rawdon-Hastings, 4th Marquess of Hastings, while Willesley Hall was left to Lady Edith Maud Rawdon-Hastings, later Countess of Loudoun, the Marquess's eldest sister and wife of Charles Frederick Clifton, who in 1859 assumed the surname Abney-Hastings.

== Hastings, later Abney-Hastings baronets, of Willesley Hall (1806) ==
- Sir Charles Hastings, 1st Baronet (died 1823)
- Sir Charles Abney-Hastings, 2nd Baronet (1792–1858)

Frank Abney Hastings, younger son of the first Baronet, was a naval officer.

Willesley Hall

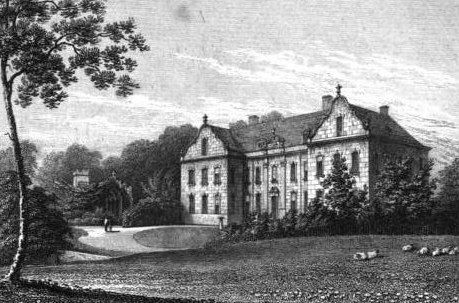
Willesley Hall

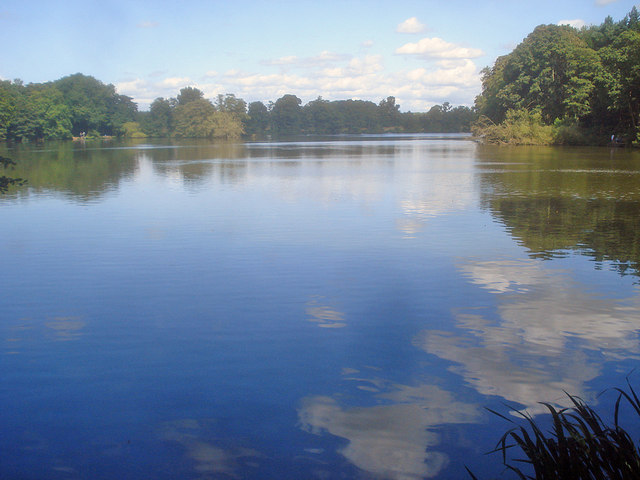
Lake behind Willesley Hall

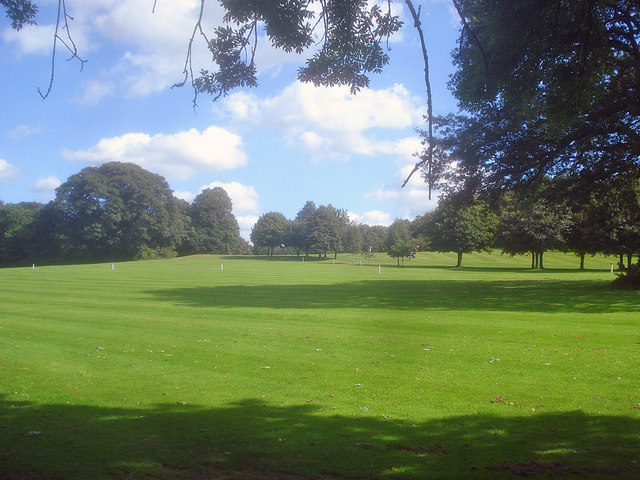
Willesley Hall golf course

== See also ==
- Hastings baronets

Baronetage of the United Kingdom
| Preceded by Bromhead baronets | Abney-Hastings baronets of Willesley Hall; 3 March 1806 | Succeeded by Shelley baronets |
