= Charles Abney-Hastings =

British politician (1792–1858)

Sir Charles Abney Hastings, 2nd Baronet
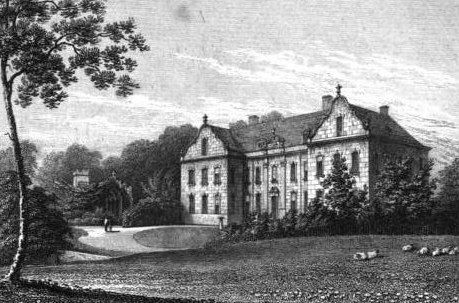
- Willesley Hall when it was the home of Sir Charles Abney-Hastings, Bt.

Member of Parliament for Leicester
- In office 1826–1831
- Preceded by: John Mansfield; Thomas Pares
- Succeeded by: William Evans; Wynne Ellis

High Sheriff of Derbyshire
- In office 1825–1826
- Preceded by: Samuel Oldknow
- Succeeded by: Sir Roger Gresley, 8th Baronet

Personal details
- Born: 1 October 1792 Willesley, Derbyshire, England
- Died: 30 July 1858 (aged 65) Marylebone, London, England
- Parent: Sir Charles Hastings, 1st Baronet (father)
- Relatives: Frank Abney Hastings (brother)

Sir Charles Abney Hastings, 2nd Baronet (1 October 1792 – 30 July 1858) of Willesley Hall, Derbyshire was both High Sheriff of Derbyshire and an MP for Leicester from 1826 to 1831.

== Biography ==
Abney-Hastings was the elder son of General Sir Charles Hastings, 1st Baronet, by the daughter and heir of Thomas Abney Esq. He was born in 1792, probably in Willesley and succeeded his father in 1823, assuming, after his maternal grandfather, the additional name of Abney before that of Hastings, by Royal Licence 1 December 1823. It was a condition of an Abney ancestor that whoever received the manors took up the surname Abney. Sir Charles was High Sheriff of Derbyshire in 1825 and was MP for Leicester from 1826 to 1831.

Charles' brother, Frank Abney Hastings, who might have inherited the title or fathered an heir, died a hero in 1828 at Zante.

Hastings died on 30 July 1858, aged 66, at his townhouse at 6 Cavendish Square, London. By a deed of settlement executed about 1846 the Blackfordby and Packington estates of Sir Charles passed to Henry Rawdon-Hastings, 4th Marquess of Hastings. Willesley Hall and its estate were left to Lady Edith Maud Rawdon-Hastings, later Countess of Loudoun, the Marquess' eldest sister and wife of Charles Frederick Clifton Esq.

Charles Frederick Clifton and his wife assumed by Act of Parliament in 1859 the surname and arms of Abney-Hastings. This was required by the conditions of Charles Abney Hastings' will. His will required that this name change should be done by "sanction of Queen, Lords and Commons namely by an Act of Parliament".

Parliament of the United Kingdom
Preceded by John Mansfield; Thomas Pares	Member of Parliament for Leicester; 1826–1831; With: Robert Otway-Cave 1826–1830; William Evans 1830–1831	Succeeded by William Evans; Wynne Ellis
Honorary titles
Preceded by Samuel Oldknow	High Sheriff of Derbyshire; 1825–1826	Succeeded by Sir Roger Gresley, Bt
Baronetage of the United Kingdom
Preceded by Charles Hastings	Baronet (of Willesley Hall); 1823–1858	Extinct
