= List of GWR 6959 Class locomotives =

This is a list of all GWR Modified Hall class locomotives built at Swindon Works by the Great Western Railway and British Railways.

Fleet list
GWR/BR Number	Name	Built	Withdrawn	Scrapped	Notes
6959	Peatling Hall	March 1944	December 1965	J Cashmore, Newport	
6960	Raveningham Hall	March 1944	June 1964	—	Preserved
6961	Stedham Hall	March 1944	September 1965	J Cashmore, Newport	
6962	Soughton Hall	April 1944	January 1963	Swindon Works	
6963	Throwley Hall	April 1944	July 1965	Bird, Long Marston	
6964	Thornbridge Hall	May 1944	September 1965	T. Ward, Beighton	
6965	Thirlestaine Hall	July 1944	October 1965	J Cashmore, Newport	
6966	Witchingham Hall	May 1944	September 1964	Bird, Newport	
6967	Willesley Hall	August 1944	December 1965	J Cashmore, Newport	
6968	Woodcock Hall	September 1944	September 1963	J Cashmore, Newport	
6969	Wraysbury Hall	September 1944	February 1965	Swindon Works	
6970	Whaddon Hall	September 1944	June 1964	Bird, Newport	
6971	Athelhampton Hall	October 1947	October 1964	Cashmore, Great Bridge	
6972	Beningbrough Hall	October 1947	March 1964	Bird, Bridgend	
6973	Bricklehamton Hall	October 1947	August 1965	Cashmore, Newport	
6974	Bryngwyn Hall	October 1947	May 1965	Bird, Newport	
6975	Capesthorne Hall	October 1947	December 1963	Slag Reduction Co., Briton Ferry	
6976	Graythwaite Hall	October 1947	October 1965	Cashmore, Great Bridge	
6977	Grundisburgh Hall	November 1947	December 1963	Bird, Newport	
6978	Haroldstone Hall	November 1947	July 1965	Bird, Swansea	
6979	Helperly Hall	November 1947	February 1965	Bird, Long Marston	
6980	Llanrumney Hall	November 1947	October 1965	J Cashmore, Great Bridge	
6981	Marbury Hall	February 1948	March 1964	Bird, Bridgend	
6982	Melmerby Hall	January 1948	August 1964	J Cashmore, Newport	
6983	Otterington Hall	February 1948	August 1965	J Cashmore, Newport	
6984	Owsden Hall	February 1948	December 1965	—	Preserved
6985	Parwick Hall	February 1948	September 1964	J Cashmore, Newport	
6986	Rydal Hall	March 1948	April 1965	Bird, Bridgend	
6987	Shervington Hall	March 1948	September 1964	Bird, Bridgend	
6988	Swithland Hall	March 1948	September 1964	Bird, Bridgend	
6989	Wightwick Hall	March 1948	June 1964	—	Preserved
6990	Witherslack Hall	April 1948	December 1965	—	Preserved
6991	Acton Burnell Hall	November 1948	December 1965	J Cashmore, Newport	
6992	Arborfield Hall	November 1948	June 1964	Bird, Newport	
6993	Arthog Hall	December 1948	December 1965	J Cashmore, Newport	
6994	Baggrave Hall	December 1948	November 1964	J Cashmore, Great Bridge	
6995	Benthall Hall	December 1948	March 1965	Bird, Long Marston	
6996	Blackwell Hall	January 1949	October 1964	Bird, Newport	
6997	Bryn-Ivor Hall	January 1949	November 1964	Bird, Bridgend	
6998	Burton Agnes Hall	January 1949	December 1965	—	Preserved
6999	Capel Dewi Hall	February 1949	December 1965	J Cashmore, Newport	
7900	Saint Peter's Hall	April 1949	December 1964	J. Friswell, Banbury	Nameplate Preserved
7901	Dodington Hall	March 1949	February 1964	Hayes, Bridgend	
7902	Eaton Mascot Hall	March 1949	June 1964	Swindon Works	
7903	Foremarke Hall	April 1949	June 1964	—	Preserved
7904	Fountains Hall	April 1949	December 1965	J Cashmore, Newport	
7905	Fowey Hall	April 1949	May 1964	Cashmore, Great Bridge	
7906	Fron Hall	December 1949	March 1965	Swindon Works	
7907	Hart Hall	January 1950	December 1965	Cashmore, Newport	
7908	Henshall Hall	January 1950	October 1965	J Cashmore, Great Bridge	
7909	Heveningham Hall	January 1950	November 1965	J Cashmore, Newport	
7910	Hown Hall	January 1950	February 1965	Swindon Works	
7911	Lady Margaret Hall	February 1950	December 1963	Bird, Newport	
7912	Little Linford Hall	March 1950	October 1965	J Cashmore, Great Bridge	
7913	Little Wyrley Hall	March 1950	March 1965	Bird, Llanelli	
7914	Lleweni Hall	March 1950	December 1965	J Cashmore, Newport	
7915	Mere Hall	March 1950	October 1965	Cashmore, Great Bridge	
7916	Mobberley Hall	April 1950	December 1964	Swindon Works	
7917	North Aston Hall	April 1950	August 1965	Bird, Llanelli	
7918	Rhose Wood Hall	April 1950	February 1965	Cohen, Swansea	
7919	Runter Hall	May 1950	December 1965	J Cashmore, Newport	
7920	Coney Hall	September 1950	June 1965	Cohen, Swansea	
7921	Edstone Hall	September 1950	December 1963	Bird, Newport	
7922	Salford Hall	September 1950	December 1965	J Cashmore, Newport	
7923	Speke Hall	September 1950	June 1965	Cohen, Swansea	
7924	Thornycroft Hall	September 1950	December 1965	J Cashmore, Newport	
7925	Westol Hall	October 1950	December 1965	J Cashmore, Newport	
7926	Willey Hall	October 1950	December 1964	Buttigieg, Newport	
7927	Willington Hall	October 1950	December 1965	—	Extant; to be cannibalised for Grange and County projects
7928	Wolf Hall	October 1950	March 1965	Swindon Works	
7929	Wyke Hall	November 1950	August 1965	Bird, Bridgend	

Notes

- Locomotives 6959–6970 were built without names, receiving their names in 1946 and 1947.
- Locomotive 6998 was sold direct to the Great Western Society, Didcot. All other preserved locomotives were originally sold as scrap to Woodham Brothers, Barry.

== See also ==
- Preserved GWR Modified Hall Class locomotives
