= Thomas Pestell =

Thomas Pestell may refer to either of two vicars of Packington, Leicestershire :

- Thomas Pestell (born 1584), father
- Thomas Pestell (born 1613), son
