= GWR 6959 Class =

Development of the GWR Hall Class

Great Western Railway 6959 Class
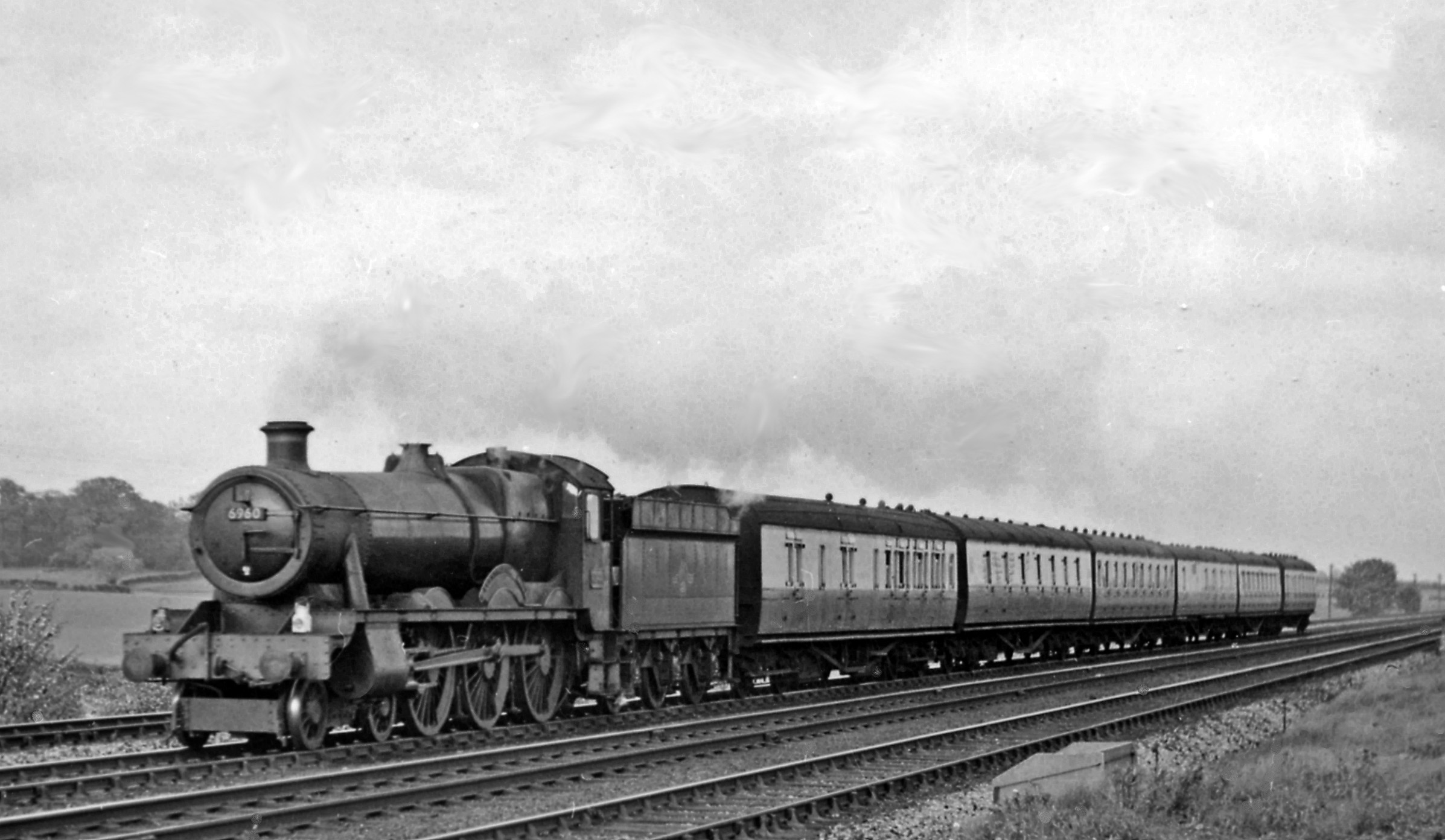
- 6960 Raveningham Hall (now preserved) with a Didcot slow train, April 1957.
Type and origin
- Power type: Steam
- Designer: Frederick Hawksworth
- Builder: GWR/BR Swindon Works
- Order number: Lots 350, 366, 368, 376
- Build date: 1944–1950
- Total produced: 71
Specifications
- Configuration
  - Whyte: 4-6-0
  - UIC: 2′C h2
- Gauge: 4 ft 8 1/2 in (1,435 mm) standard gauge
- Leading dia.: 3 ft 0 in (0.914 m)
- Driver dia.: 6 ft 0 in (1.829 m)
- Minimum curve: 8 chains (530 ft; 160 m) normal, 7 chains (460 ft; 140 m) slow
- Length: 63 ft 0 1/4 in (19.21 m) over buffers
- Width: 8 ft 11 1/2 in (2.731 m)
- Height: 13 ft 2 1/16 in (4.015 m)
- Axle load: 19 long tons 5 cwt (43,100 lb or 19.6 t) (21.6 short tons)
- Adhesive weight: 57 long tons 10 cwt (128,800 lb or 58.4 t) (64.4 short tons)
- Loco weight: 75 long tons 16 cwt (169,800 lb or 77 t) (84.9 short tons) full
- Tender weight: 47 long tons 6 cwt (106,000 lb or 48.1 t) (53.0 short tons) full
- Fuel type: Coal
- Fuel capacity: 6 long tons 0 cwt (13,400 lb or 6.1 t) (5.6 short tons)
- Water cap.: 4,000 imp gal (18,000 L; 4,800 US gal)
- Firebox
  - Grate area: 27.07 sq ft (2.515 m^{2})
- Boiler: GWR Standard No. 1
- Boiler pressure: 225 psi (1.55 MPa)
- Heating surface
  - Firebox: 154.90 sq ft (14.391 m^{2})
  - Tubes and flues: 1,582.60 sq ft (147.028 m^{2})
- Superheater
  - Heating area: 295 sq ft (27.4 m^{2})
- Cylinders: Two, outside
- Cylinder size: 18.5 in × 30 in (470 mm × 762 mm)
- Valve gear: Stephenson, inside
- Valve type: Piston valves
Performance figures
- Tractive effort: 27,275 lbf (121.33 kN)
Career
- Operators: Great Western Railway → British Railways
- Power class: GWR: D, BR: 5MT
- Numbers: 6959–6999, 7900-7929
- Axle load class: GWR: Red
- Withdrawn: January 1963 – December 1965
- Disposition: Six preserved, one donor, remainder scrapped

The Great Western Railway (GWR) 6959 or Modified Hall Class is a class of 4-6-0 type steam locomotive. They were a development by Frederick Hawksworth of Charles Collett's earlier Hall Class named after English and Welsh country houses.

== Background ==
Although the GWR had been at the forefront of British locomotive development between 1900 and 1930, the 1930s saw a degree of complacency at Swindon reflected in the fact that many designs and production methods had not kept pace with developments elsewhere. This was especially true with the useful GWR 4900 Class, the design of which largely originated in the 1900s and had not fundamentally changed since the mid-1920s. Charles Collett was replaced as the Chief Mechanical Engineer of the Railway by F.W. Hawksworth in 1941 who immediately created a modified version of the design, known as the 'Modified Hall Class'.

== Design ==
The Modified Halls marked the most radical change to Swindon Works' practice since Churchward's time as chief mechanical engineer and was very far from a simple modification of the Hall design. 'Although in outward appearance it looked almost the same, nearly everything about it was new.' Hawksworth's use of plate frames throughout the design was a break with Churchward's practice for 2 cylinder locomotives. The cylinders were cast separately from the smokebox saddle and bolted to the frames on each side. A stiffening brace was inserted between the frames and extended to form the smokebox saddle. The exhaust pipes leading from the cylinders to the blastpipe were incorporated into this assembly.

Additionally, Churchward's bar framed bogie which had been adapted for the original Hall prototype in 1924 was replaced by a plate frame structure with individual springing. There were changes, too, above the running board. Hawksworth decided that the declining quality of coal reaching Great Western depots necessitated a higher degree of superheating. A larger three-row superheater and header regulator were fitted into Swindon No.1 boiler. Improvements were subsequently made to the draughting on some engines, while others were fitted with hopper ashpans.

== Production ==
The first batch of twelve Modified Halls was delivered from Swindon works between March and September 1944. They carried plain black livery, were unnamed and numbered 6959-6970 (immediately following the Hall Class sequence). They were all subsequently named between 1946 and 1948.

A further batch of ten locomotives appeared during October and November 1947 and others were on order when the nationalisation of Britain's railways took place in 1948. British Railways continued construction of this class until November 1950, by which time there were seventy-one examples.

Some modified Halls were equipped with a flat, high-sided Hawksworth tenders. Once he became Chief Mechanical Engineer, many earlier locomotives also received these tenders so a Hawksworth tender does not necessarily mean a Hawksworth locomotive.

Table of order and numbers
Year	Quantity	Lot No.	Locomotive numbers	Notes
1944	12	350	6959–6970	
1947–48	20	366	6971–6990	
1948–50	29	368	6991–6999, 7900–7919	
1950	10	376	7920–7929	

== Assessment ==
The Modified Hall class 'ran freely, steamed well and were popular with both footplate and maintenance staff. After the unambitious designs of Collett's final years, they restored Swindon's reputation.' Fourteen survived until the end of steam on the former GWR in 1965.

== List of locomotives ==
- See List of GWR 6959 Class locomotives

== Preservation ==
Six Modified Halls have been preserved on various heritage railways. A seventh survivor numbered 7927 Willington Hall is being used as a donor for the Grange and County re-creation projects.

Out of the six engines to be preserved, five engines have run in preservation. The only engine yet to run is 6984 Owsden Hall. Half of the class have also seen main line operation: Nos. 6960 Raveningham Hall, 6990 Witherslack Hall and 6998 Burton Agnes Hall. 6960 and 6998 saw main use in the 1980s, especially in 1985 when the locos were regularly used during the GW150 Celebrations. 6998 was a popular mainline performer in the late 1980s, and also in the 1990s, until 1996 when she was withdrawn from operation awaiting an overhaul. Three of the class are currently operational but since 6998 was withdrawn no Modified Halls have been seen running on the main line.

Number	Name	Image	Built	Withdrawn	Tender fitted	Status	Livery	Current location	Notes
6960	Raveningham Hall		March 1944	June 1964	Collett	Awaiting overhaul	GWR Lined Green, GW Lettering	One:One Collection	
6984	Owsden Hall		February 1948	December 1965	Collett	Undergoing Restoration	BR Lined Green, Early Emblem (On Completion)	Buckinghamshire Railway Centre	Undergoing restoration from ex Barry scrapyard condition. Transferred from the Swindon and Cricklade Railway in 2019. Its tender was in use behind 6989 Wightwick Hall until the intended completion of its own.
6989	Wightwick Hall		March 1948	June 1964	Collett	Operational, boiler certificate (2019–2029)	Howarts Red, no tender logo	Buckinghamshire Railway Centre	Entered service in March 2019 following restoration from ex Barry scrapyard condition, borrowing 6984's tender. In 2025, it was announced that 6989 Wightwick Hall will be the locomotive chosen to pull the Hogwarts Express in the new Harry Potter reboot from HBO.
6990	Witherslack Hall		April 1948	December 1965	Hawksworth	Operational, boiler certificate (2016–2026)	BR Lined Green, Early Emblem	Great Central Railway	Recently returned to traffic from a major overhaul which included the pairing with an authentic Hawksworth tender which was formerly paired with 4930 Hagley Hall.
6998	Burton Agnes Hall		January 1949	December 1965	Hawksworth	Static Display	GWR Lined Green, GW Lettering	Didcot Railway Centre	Awaiting Overhaul. Famed for working the GWS Vintage trains which used vintage GWR carriages. She was the only member of her class to not be rescued from Barry Scrapyard.
7903	Foremarke Hall		March 1949	June 1964	Hawksworth	Awaiting Overhaul	BR Lined Green, Late Crest	Gloucestershire and Warwickshire Railway	

== See also ==
- List of GWR standard classes with two outside cylinders
