= Hastings baronets =

Extinct baronetcy in the Baronetage of the United Kingdom

There have been two baronetcies created for members of the Hastings family headed by the Earl of Huntingdon, one in the Baronetage of England and one in the Baronetage of the United Kingdom. Both creations are extinct.

The Hastings Baronetcy, of Redlinch in the County of Somerset, was created in the Baronetage of England on 7 May 1667 for Richard Hastings. He was the grandson of Sir Edward Hastings, younger son of Francis Hastings, 2nd Earl of Huntingdon (see Earl of Huntingdon for earlier history of the family). Hastings married Margaret, daughter of Sir Robert Pointz, but had no children, and the title became extinct on his death in 1668. Margaret remarried Samuel Gorges, later a High Court judge in Ireland. Her first marriage was apparently a happy one: at her death, she left Samuel a portrait of Richard.

The Hastings, later Abney-Hastings family, of Willesley Hall in the County of Derby, was created in the Baronetage of the United Kingdom on 28 February 1806 for Sir Charles Hastings, illegitimate son of Francis Hastings, 10th Earl of Huntingdon. For more information on this creation, see Abney-Hastings baronets.

== Hastings baronets, of Redlinch (1667) ==
- Sir Richard Hastings, 1st Baronet (died 1668)

== Hastings, later Abney-Hastings baronets, of Willesley Hall (1806) ==
- see Abney-Hastings baronets

== See also ==
- Earl of Huntingdon
