= General Hastings =

General Hastings may refer to:

- Daniel H. Hastings (1849–1903), Pennsylvania State Militia major general
- Sir Charles Hastings, 1st Baronet (1752–1823), British Army general

== See also ==
- Francis Rawdon-Hastings, 1st Marquess of Hastings (1754−1826), British Army general
- Attorney General Hastings (disambiguation)
