= Blackfordby =

Village in Leicestershire, England

Coordinates: 52.758°N 1.513°W

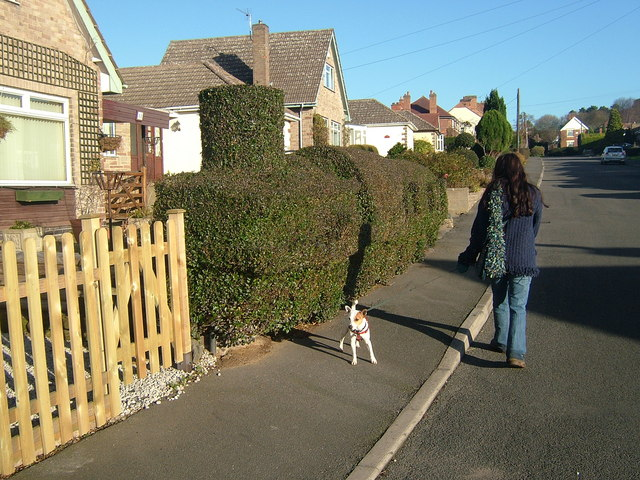
- A street in Blackfordby

- Location within Leicestershire
- Civil parish: Ashby-de-la-Zouch
- District: North West Leicestershire
- Shire county: Leicestershire
- Region: East Midlands
- Country: England
- Sovereign state: United Kingdom
- Post town: SWADLINCOTE
- Postcode district: DE11
- Dialling code: 01283
- UK Parliament: North West Leicestershire

Blackfordby is a village in the civil parish of Ashby-de-la-Zouch, in the North West Leicestershire district, in the northwesternmost corner of Leicestershire, England. It is about 2 miles (3.2 km) to the northwest of Ashby-de-la-Zouch and 2 miles (3.2 km) southeast of Swadlincote. On some early maps, such as one dated 1587, the village is shown as "Blaugherby", hence the local name of "Blofferby". The village is dominated by the Church of St Margaret of Antioch, Blackfordby, erected in 1858 on the site of an earlier Anglican Chapel which was attached to the St Helen's Church, Ashby-de-la-Zouch. The church stands in an elevated position next to the village school, and is built in the early English style. The church has a nave and chancel, with a tower surmounted by a broach spire and, for the greater part of the work, constructed from local sandstone which has become blackened due to the effects of air pollution.

Until recent years there were several 16th & 17th century thatched cottages in and around the village, but now only two remain, one on Main Street, and one behind the "Rec". Both are now protected buildings.

For many years the population remained at about 500, mainly agricultural workers, until the advent of the "Pits & Pipeworks". It is still a fairly quiet, rural village, although the population has greatly expanded in recent years. Council houses were built in 1948 and 1950, but the biggest changes have been brought about by private development. The village school still survives and has been extended to allow children to continue their education there until they are eleven years old. There were two pubs, The Black Lion and The Blue Bell, but no shops or Post Office. Now only one pub remains. The Black Lion.

== History ==
In 1866 Blackfordby became a parish in its own right, on 1 April 1936 the parish was abolished and merged with Ashby de la Zouch, part also went to Ashby Woulds. In 1931 the parish had a population of 705.

== Toponymy ==
The village's name means 'farm/settlement with a dark-coloured ford'.

== History ==
Charles Abney Hastings of Willesley Hall died on 30 July 1858, aged 66. By a deed of settlement, executed about 1846, the Blackfordby and Packington estates of Sir Charles passed to the Marquis of Hastings, who was Henry Rawdon-Hastings.
