= Thomas Pestell (born 1584) =

Thomas Pestell or Pestel (1584 – 1659) was an English clergyman and poet.

Pestell was educated at Queens' College, Cambridge ( B.A., 1605; M.A., 1609). He became vicar of Packington, Leicestershire in 1613, and later chaplain to Robert Devereux, 3rd Earl of Essex.

Pestell was appointed a royal chaplain and preached before Charles I. He was succeeded as vicar of Packington by his son, also called Thomas, in 1644.

John Nichols notes that Pestell was imprisoned several times for "christening a child and marrying, and for not keeping parliament feasts and thanksgiving days." Nichols concludes that "this worthy old man appears to have tasted bitterly of the cup of affliction." In 1633 Pestell was found guilty of the High Commission Court of various charges, while in 1646 he and his son were called before a Parliamentary Committee to answer charges of delinquency. Both times the accuser was a parishioner who seems to have acted out of malice.

A number of Pestell's poems are included in his Sermons and Devotions, Old and New (1659). Three of them are included in the Oxford Book of Christian Verse: "Psalm for Christmas Day", "A Psalm for Sunday Night," and "The Relief on Easter Eve".
