= Church of St Margaret of Antioch, Blackfordby =

Church in Blackfordby, Leicestershire

Coordinates: 52°45′35″N 1°30′42″W

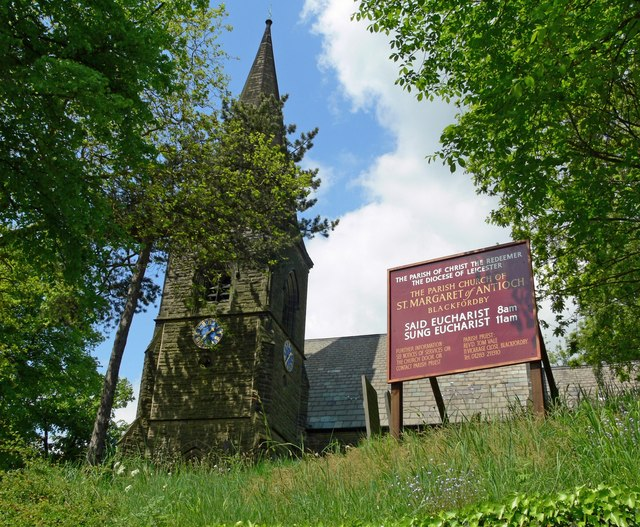
- Church of St Margaret of Antioch, Blackfordby
- Denomination: Church of England

History
- Dedication: St Margaret of Antioch

Administration
- Diocese: Leicester
- Archdeaconry: Loughborough
- Parish: Blackfordby, Leicestershire

The Church of St Margaret of Antioch is a church in Blackfordby, Leicestershire. It is a Grade II listed building.

== History ==
=== Exterior ===
The church is built in the Decorated style. The tower has 3 stages with a broach spire, lucarnes and diagonal buttresses. The south doorway has foliage capitals. The nave has 2 single-light windows and 2 2-light windows. The chancel has a trefoil-headed south doorway, diagonal buttresses, 2 2-light south windows, 3-light East window with intersecting tracery. The vestry has 2 cusped east windows.

=== Interior ===
The nave has a 5-bay hammerbeam roof. The chancel's canted boarded ceiling is painted blue. The chancel' north arcade has an octagonal central pier and double-chamfered arches.

The font is made of Chellaston marble. There is a tablet to Edward Newcomen (died 1722) and his wife. The chancel has a fragment of medieval stained glass believed to depict St Margaret of Antioch.
