= Battle of Itea =

1827 naval battle in the Gulf of Corinth during the Greek War of Independence

- Part of the Greek War of Independence
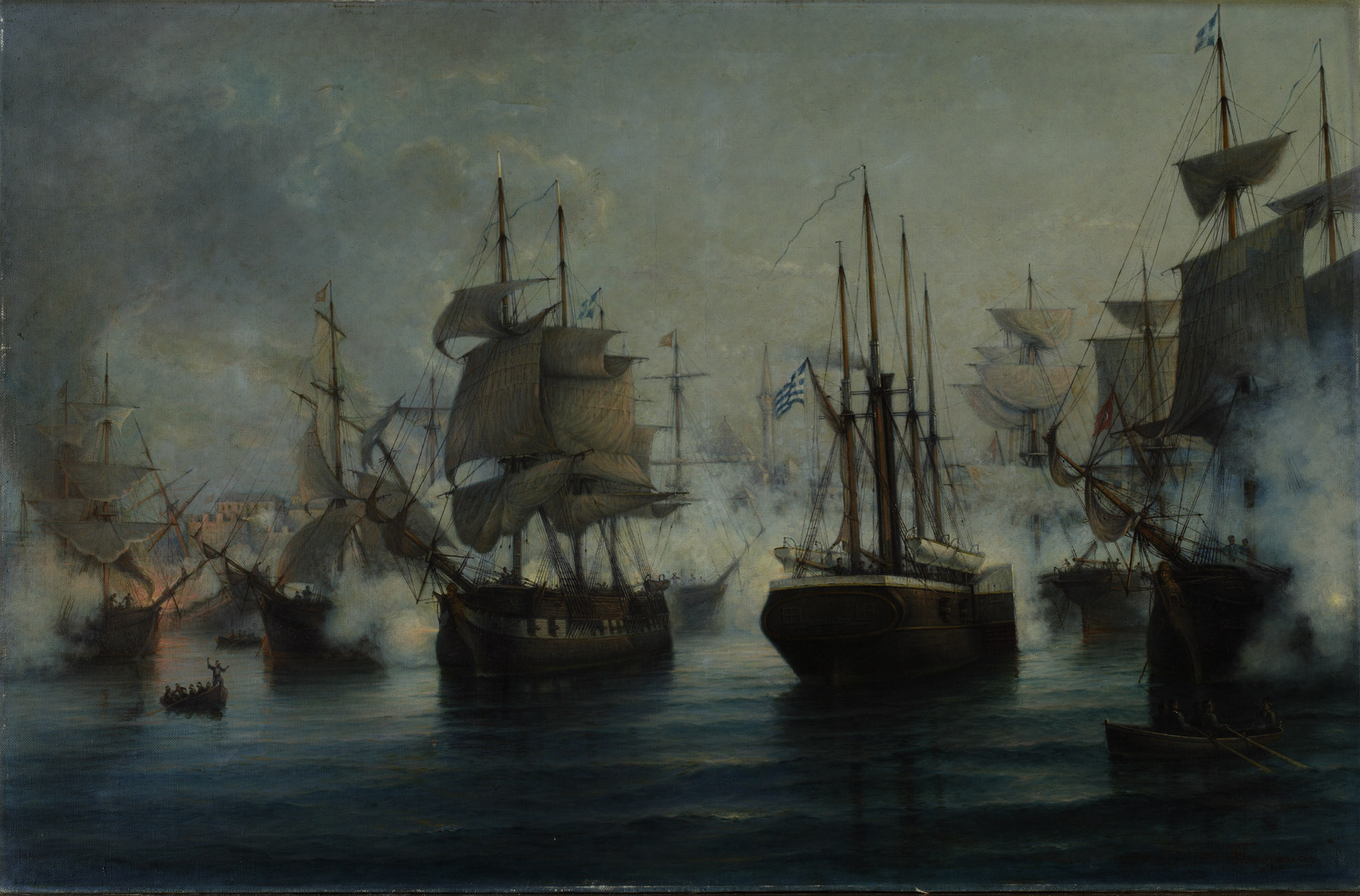
- Painting depicting the Battle of Itea by Yiannis Poulakas
Date	30 September 1827
Location	off Itea, Aegean Sea
Result	Greek victory

Belligerents
(Greece) First Hellenic Republic	Ottoman Empire: Eyalet of Egypt

Commanders and leaders
Frank Abney Hastings	Unknown

Strength
4 ships	3 schooners 3 brigs 3 transport ships 1 gunboat

Casualties and losses
Unknown	7 ships destroyed two captured

The Battle of Itea (Greek: Ναυμαχία της Ιτέας) or Battle of Agali (Ναυμαχία της Αγκάλης) was a naval battle fought on 30 September 1827, in the Gulf of Corinth, during the Greek War of Independence. Under the command of British Philhellene, Frank Abney Hastings, a small Greek squadron launched a raid on an Ottoman fleet anchored near Itea.

== Opposing forces ==
The Greek squadron consisted of a brig and two small gunboats led by the flagship Karteria, a steam-powered warship. Opposing the Greeks was the Ottoman fleet, consisting of three schooners, three brigs, three transports and a gunboat, protected by shore batteries

== The battle ==
As Hastings with the Karteria approached, the Ottoman fleet confident of the superiority of their firepower, would initially hold their fire. As Hastings approached within 500 yards of the Ottoman ships he ordered his fleet to drop anchor. After an initial ranging shot by the Karteria, the Ottoman ships would open fire focusing their shots on the steamship. In reply to this, the Karteria would begin firing grapeshot with the intention of disabling the Ottoman crews and to destroy their ships' rigging, while the Greek ship's guns would open fire with explosive rounds destroying three Ottoman vessels. The Ottoman shore batteries would also come under fire by grape shot, dispersing their men. Hastings would attempt to capture the remaining Ottoman vessels while coming under musket fire from Ottoman troops who had returned to their posts. Hastings would succeed in capturing two ships, and set fire to the remaining four.

== Aftermath ==
News of the Greek victory would quickly spread contributing to fresh recruits joining the revolutionary forces, while after learning of Hastings victory Ibrahim Pasha vowed to take revenge by destroying the Karteria, a promise which would remain unrealised. The battle also served as a catalyst to the Battle of Navarino, by provoking aggressive actions by Ibrahim Pasha.
