= GWR 4900 Class 4930 Hagley Hall =

Preserved British steam locomotive

GWR 4930 Hagley Hall
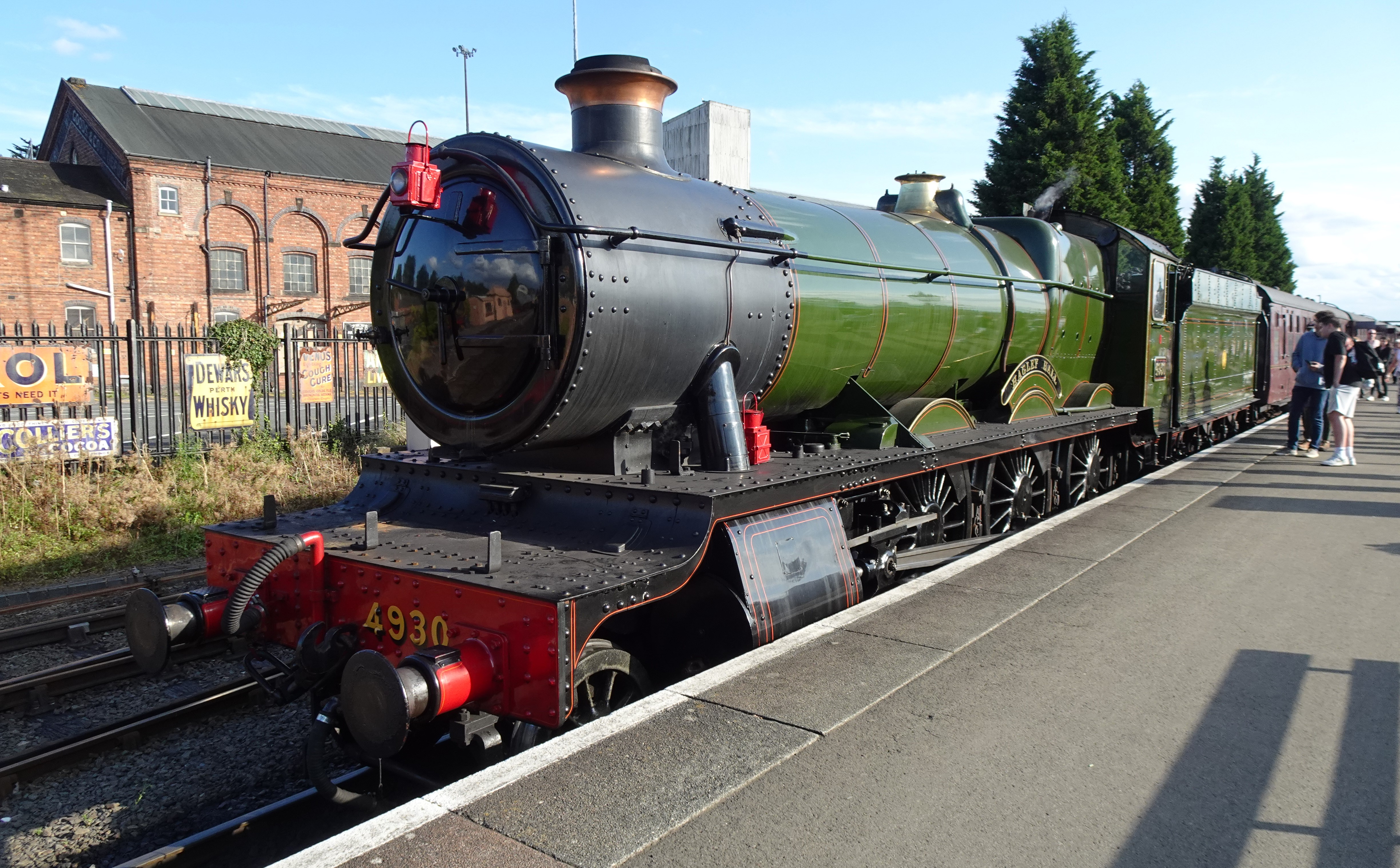
- 4930 Hagley Hall on the Severn Valley Railway, September 2023.
Type and origin
- Power type: Steam
- Designer: Charles Collett
- Builder: GWR Swindon Works
- Build date: May 1929
Specifications
- Configuration
  - Whyte: 4-6-0
  - UIC: 2'Ch2
- Gauge: 4 ft 8 1/2 in (1,435 mm)
- Leading dia.: 3 ft 0 in (0.914 m)
- Driver dia.: 6 ft 0 in (1.829 m)
- Length: 63 ft 0 1/4 in (19.21 m) over buffers
- Width: 8 ft 11 1/4 in (2.724 m)
- Height: 13 ft 3 1/4 in (4.045 m)
- Loco weight: 75 long tons 3 cwt (168,300 lb or 76.4 t)
- Fuel type: Coal
- Water cap.: 4,000 imp gal (18,000 L; 4,800 US gal)
- Boiler: GWR Standard No.1
- Boiler pressure: 225 psi (1.55 MPa)
- Cylinders: Two, outside
- Cylinder size: 20 in × 26 in (508 mm × 660 mm)
Performance figures
- Tractive effort: 27,275 lbf (121,330 N)
Career
- Operators: GWR » BR
- Class: Hall
- Power class: GWR: D, BR: 5MT
- Numbers: 4930
- Withdrawn: December 1963
- Restored: 1979
- Current owner: Severn Valley Railway (Holdings) PLC
- Disposition: Operational

4930 Hagley Hall is a Hall class 4-6-0 steam locomotive, built in May 1929 at Swindon Works to a design by Charles Collett. It is one of eleven of this class that made it into preservation. The locomotive is named after Hagley Hall in Worcestershire.

== Operation ==
Its first shed allocation was Wolverhampton Stafford Road. After moving around the midland and southern sections of the western region it was withdrawn in December 1963, having covered the impressive total of 1,295,236 miles, eventually being sold for scrap to Woodham Brothers scrapyard in Barry, Vale of Glamorgan, South Wales, arriving in June 1964.

== Preservation ==
Sold to the Severn Valley Railway in June 1972, it became the 29th departure from Barry arriving at Bridgnorth in January 1973. It was eventually restored to working condition in 1979, and ran back on the mainline reaching as far south as Plymouth and north to Chester. 4930 hauled the official re-opening train into Kidderminster Town station in 1984.

4930 was also one of the regular locomotives used on the mainline in 1985 during the 150th anniversary of the Great Western Railway alongside 3440 City of Truro, 5051 Drysllwyn Castle, 6000 King George V, 7029 Clun Castle, 7819 Hinton Manor, 75069 & 92220 Evening Star. During one occasion on 7 April 1985, it travelled overnight from the Severn Valley Railway to Plymouth, where it replaced 6000 King George V after it was failed in Taunton with a hotbox while working a railtour from Bristol to Plymouth while double-heading with fellow SVR resident 7819 Hinton Manor (7819 while working the same trip was later failed in Exeter with a hotbox). The next day, 8 April 4930 double-headed the trip back from Plymouth with a repaired 7819.

4930 was a regular mainline performer from 1979 to 1986, when the engine was withdrawn from service. It worked a total of 21 railtours either solo or double-heading with other engines, including fellow SVR residents 5000, 6960 Raveningham Hall, 7812 Erlestoke Manor & 7819 Hinton Manor.

After its withdrawal in 1986 pending overhaul, it was loaned in 1999 to the Macarthur Glen shopping centre in Swindon as a static exhibit. In June 2007 it was returned to the Severn Valley Railway intending to take its place in the new 'Engine House' outside Highley railway station. After a delay due to the floods that hit the railway in June 2007, the Engine House opened in March 2008 when Hagley Hall was placed on show.

== Return to steam ==
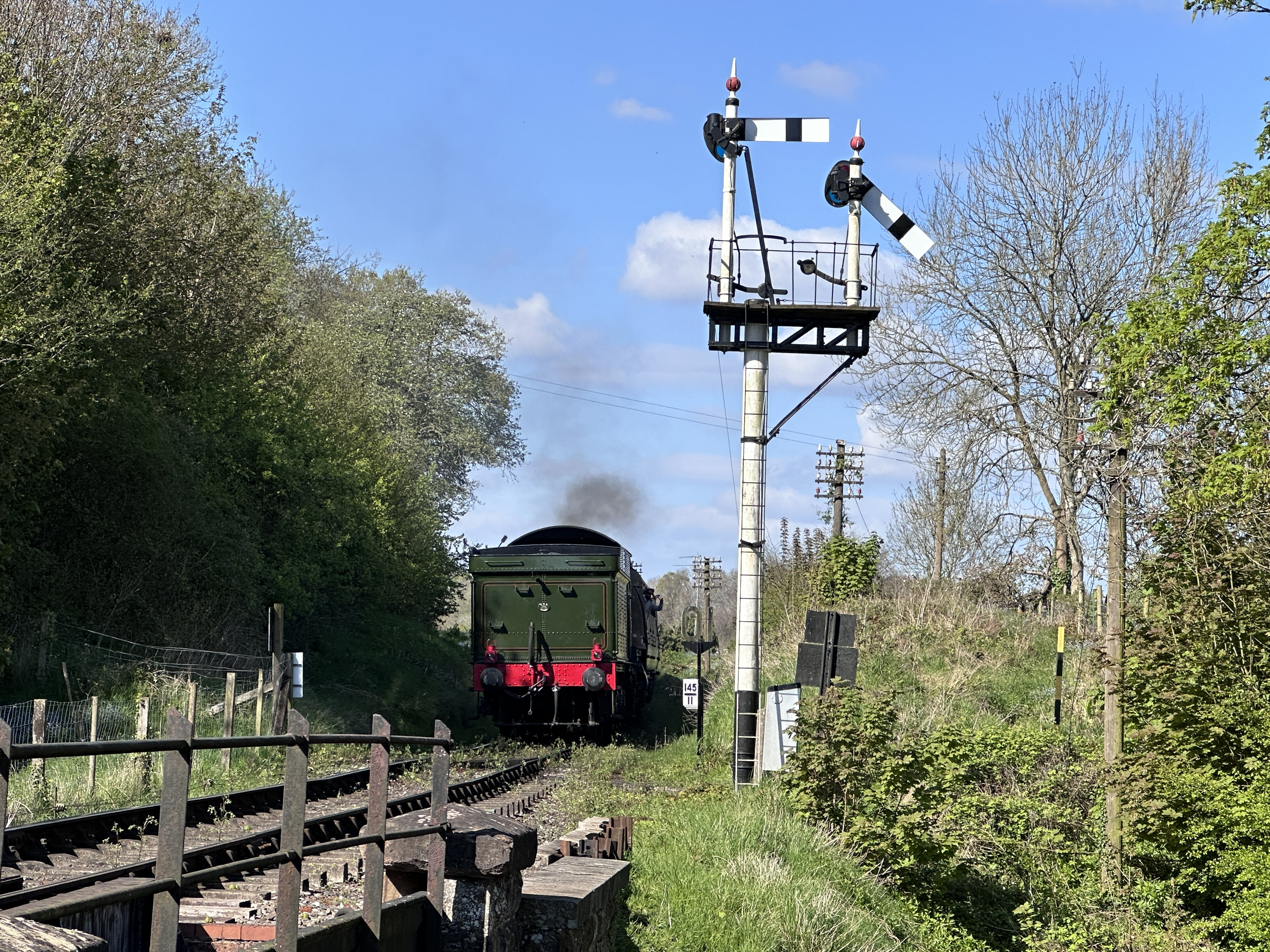
Arriving into Hampton Loade with a service for Kidderminster in 2024.

In October 2013, 4930 was moved from the Engine House to Bridgnorth so that the overhaul could begin, supported by the SVR Charitable Trust and the Friends of Locomotive Hagley Hall Group. Some of the money for the overhaul was raised by members of the public who subscribed to the SVR's share offer scheme, which included the objectives of restoring 4930 and some matching Great Western coaches. Overhaul included major firebox attention and the casting and machining of new cylinders. 4930 has also swapped its Hawksworth tender for Witherslack Hall's Collett tender.

Running in post-overhaul commenced on 23 June 2022, followed by its return to service on 9 September 2022. 4930 is planned to remain in operation until 2032 when its boiler ticket expires.

In April 2025, it was announced that 4930 was to appear at The Greatest Gathering alongside a pair of the Severn Valley Railway's Great Western Railway coaches. Movement of 4930 alongside LMS Stanier Mogul number 13268 as well as a pair of London Midland and Scottish Railway coaches from the Severn Valley Railway to Derby Litchurch Lane Works was done by rail behind a diesel locomotive. The move also marked the first time since 1986 that 4930 had run on the mainline.

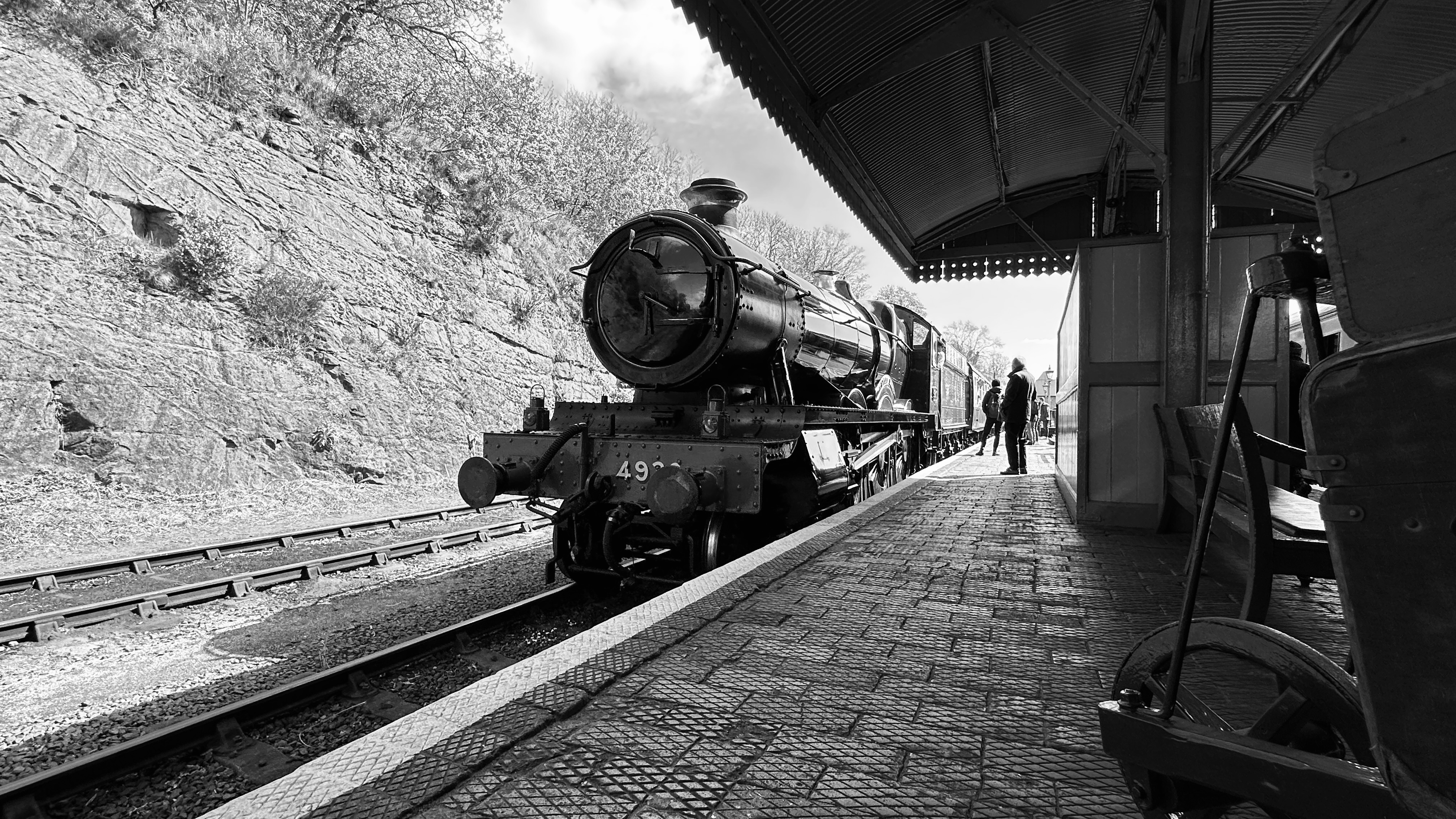
At Bewdley on a northbound service.

== Allocations ==
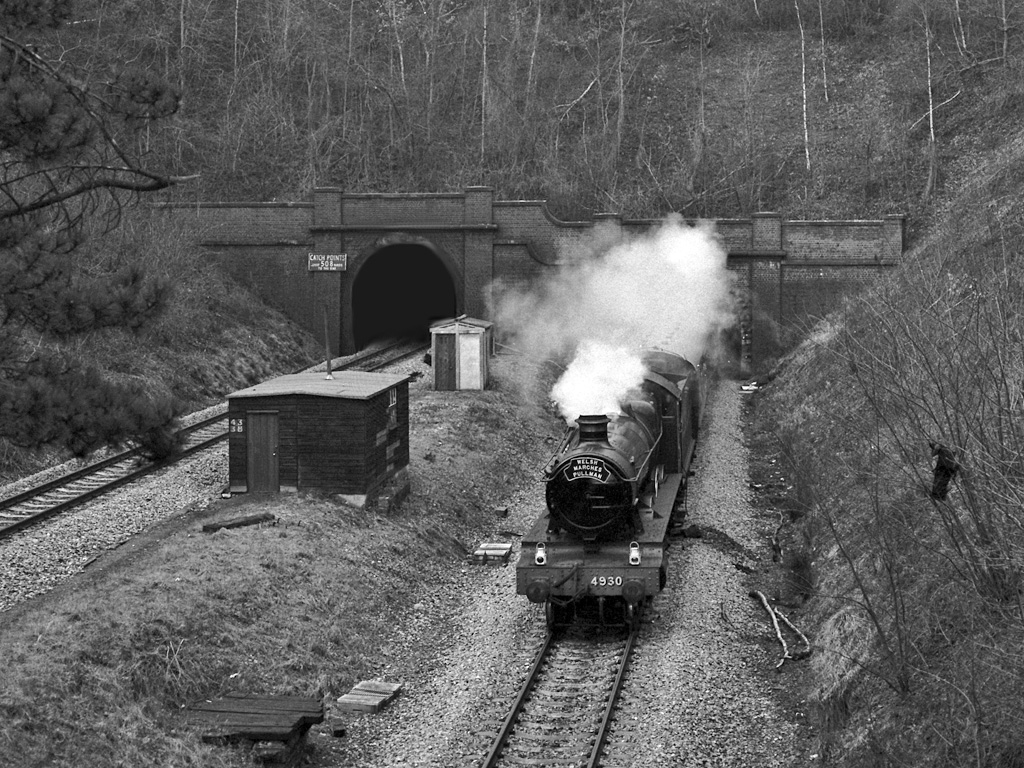
Emerging from Dinmore Tunnel on the Welsh Marches Line in 1983.

First shed	Wolverhampton Stafford Road
August 1950	Weymouth
March 1959	Taunton
Last Shed	Swindon
Withdrawn	December 1963
Sold to Woodham Brothers	May 1964

== Popular culture ==
The engine features in the 1986 documentary "Steam Days" with Miles Kington on a run out from Bristol to Plymouth with fellow GWR engine Drysllwyn Castle during the 150th Anniversary of the GWR in 1985.

4930 also featured running passenger trains on the SVR in the 1986 programme The Great Western Experience alongside other GWR locomotives, such as 5764, 5051 Drysllwyn Castle, 6998 Burton Agnes Hall and 7029 Clun Castle.
