= Samuel Gorges =

Samuel Gorges (1635–1686) was an English-born barrister and judge in seventeenth-century Ireland. His career has been described as "short and tragic".

He was a member of the famous Gorges family of Wraxall Court in Somerset. He was the younger son of Samuel Gorges of Charlton Mackrell and his wife Jane Cotterell, daughter of John Cotterell of Winford, and widow of George Allen of Wrington. Edward Gorges (1631–1708), MP for Somerset, was his elder brother. He matriculated from Queen's College, Oxford in 1652 and entered the Inner Temple in 1655. He was called to the Bar in 1665 and became King's Counsel in 1684.

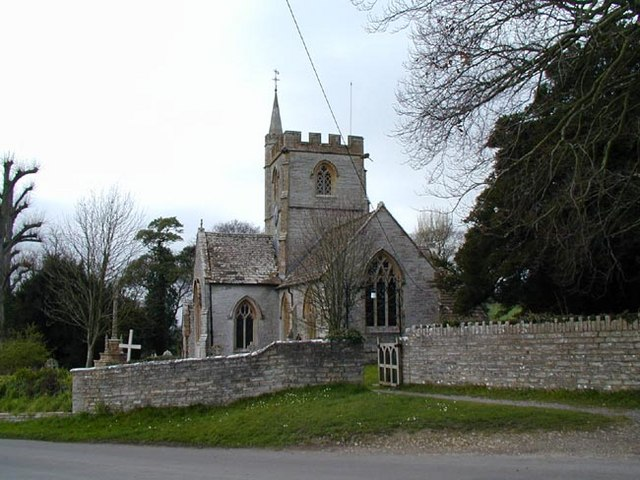
Charlton Mackrell Church- Gorges was a native of the village.

He married in 1669 Margaret Pointz (or Poyntz), daughter of Sir Robert Pointz of Iron Acton, Gloucestershire and his first wife Frances Gibbons, and widow of Sir Richard Hastings, first and last of the Hastings baronets, of Redlinch. She died without issue in 1685.

Margaret was a first cousin of James Butler, 1st Duke of Ormonde, the Lord Lieutenant of Ireland, whose mother Elizabeth, Lady Thurles was Sir Robert Pointz's sister. Ormonde was always generous to his friends and relatives, and it may have been at the Duke's suggestion that Gorges came to Ireland in about 1680.

In 1682 Gorges was appointed second justice, or Master of the Rolls, of Ormonde's own feudal court, the Palatine Court of Tipperary. The post of Palatine judge was generally regarded as a sinecure, and certainly the Court's workload would not seem to require two judges, but Gorges seems to have performed his duties adequately since in 1684 he was elevated to the far more onerous office of justice of the Court of Common Pleas (Ireland). He died in 1686 and was buried in St Mary's Church, Kilkenny. His last years were unhappy: his wife had died and he was heavily in debt. At his death, according to his last will and testament, he left only a diamond ring, a portrait, his pistols and his horse and carriage.

== Sources ==
- Ball, F. Elrington The Judges in Ireland 1221-1921 London John Murray 1926
- Henning, D. B. ed. The History of Parliament: the House of Commons 1660-1690 Boydell and Brewer 1983
- Townsend, Peter Burke's Landed Gentry 18th Edition 3 Volumes London 1965
