= Attorney General Hastings =

Attorney General Hastings may refer to:

- Patrick Hastings (1880–1952), Attorney General for England and Wales
- Serranus Clinton Hastings (1814–1893), Attorney General of California

== See also ==
- General Hastings (disambiguation)
