= GWR 6959 Class 7903 Foremarke Hall =

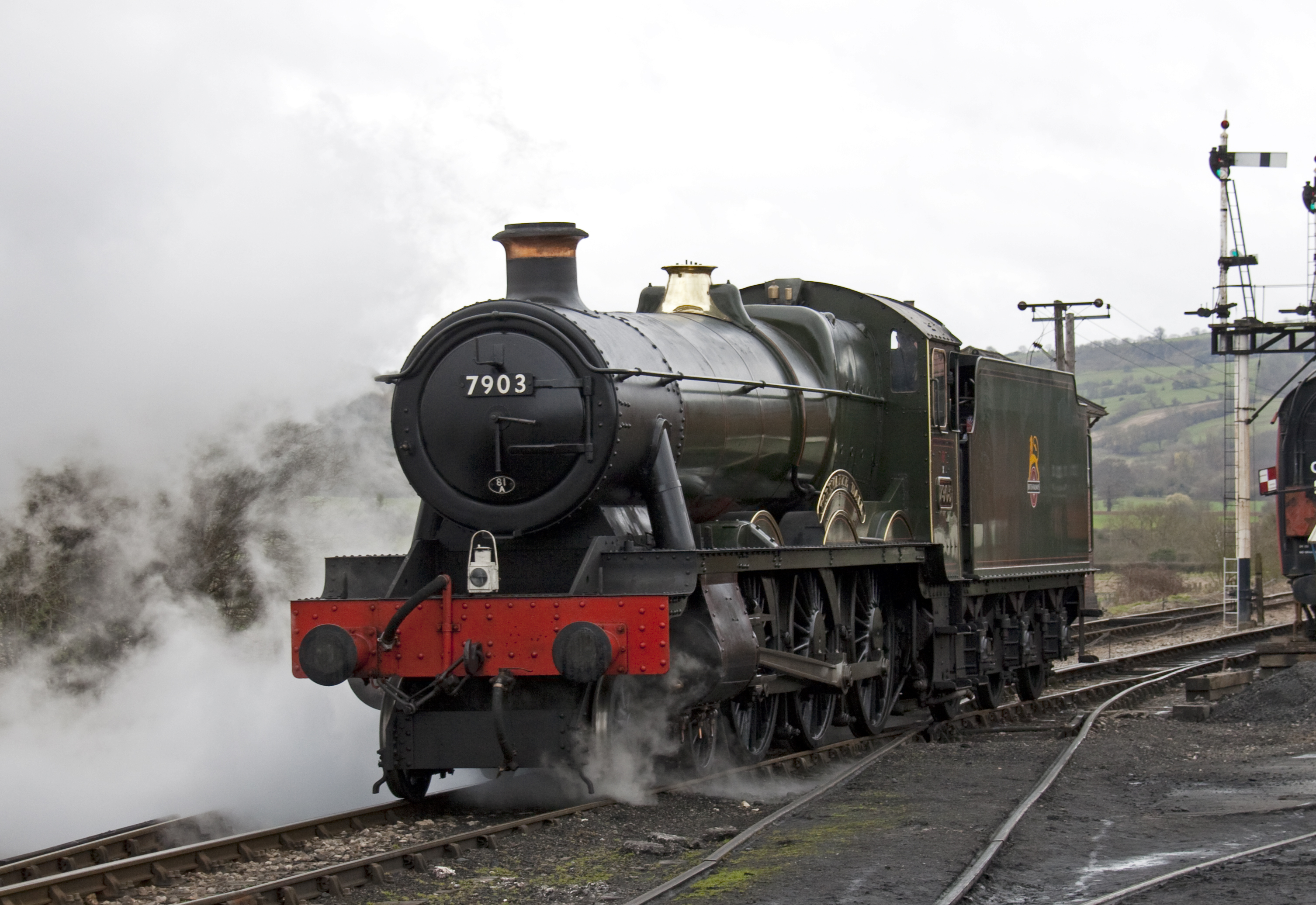
7903 Formarke Hall on the GloucsWarks Railway.

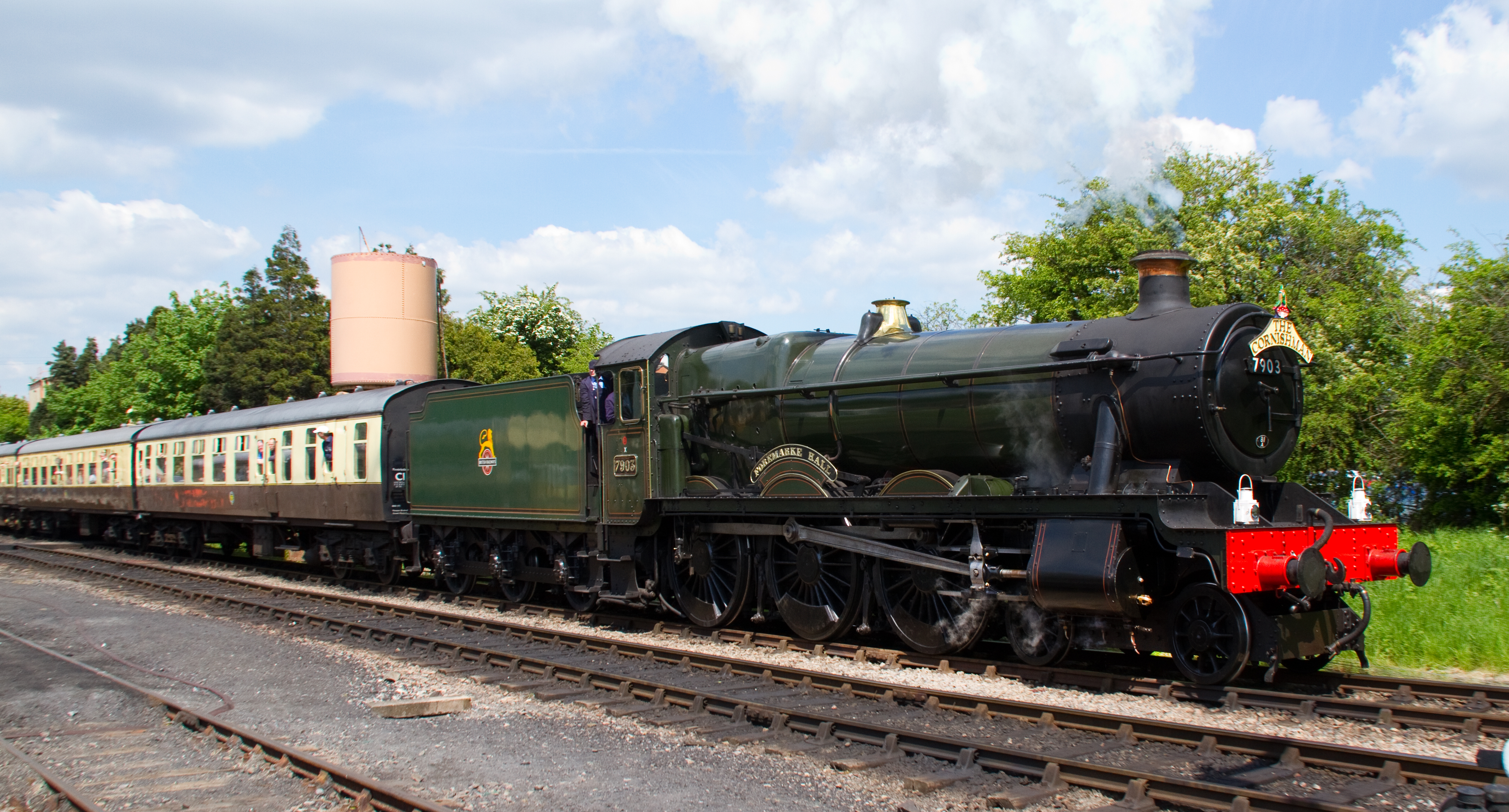
Leaving Toddington.

Great Western Railway Modified Hall Class, 7903 Foremarke Hall is a preserved British steam locomotive, built in 1949 at Swindon Works. The loco's first shed allocation Old Oak Common, and it was named after the Derbyshire stately home. In both August 1950 and March 1959, the loco's shed allocations was still Old Oak Common, but by the time of the loco's withdrawal in 1964, her allocation was at Cardiff East Dock. It was also used as 6999 Capel Dewi Hall.

It was withdrawn from service with British Railways in 1964 and sold for scrap to Woodhams' Scrapyard in Barry. Seventeen years later, in 1981, the loco was saved for preservation, and moved to the Swindon and Cricklade Railway where restoration work began.

The loco's restoration was completed 22 years later in September 2003. The locomotive was briefly used on the Swindon and Cricklade Railway during the tail end of 2003 and early months of 2004 before moving to the nearby Gloucestershire Warwickshire Railway by May 2004, where it is now based, although the engine did also visit the Llangollen Railway in June 2005, the Severn Valley Railway in September 2005, and Old Oak Common Depot in September 2017, as well as undergoing a full 10-year overhaul at Tyseley Locomotive Works between the end of 2013 and early May 2016. The loco also featured in two episodes of the BBC Crime Drama Father Brown that were filmed on the GWSR during the summers of 2012 and 2016, with the episodes being aired during the early months of 2013 and 2017.
