= GWR 6959 Class 6960 Raveningham Hall =

Preserved British steam locomotive

6960 Raveningham Hall
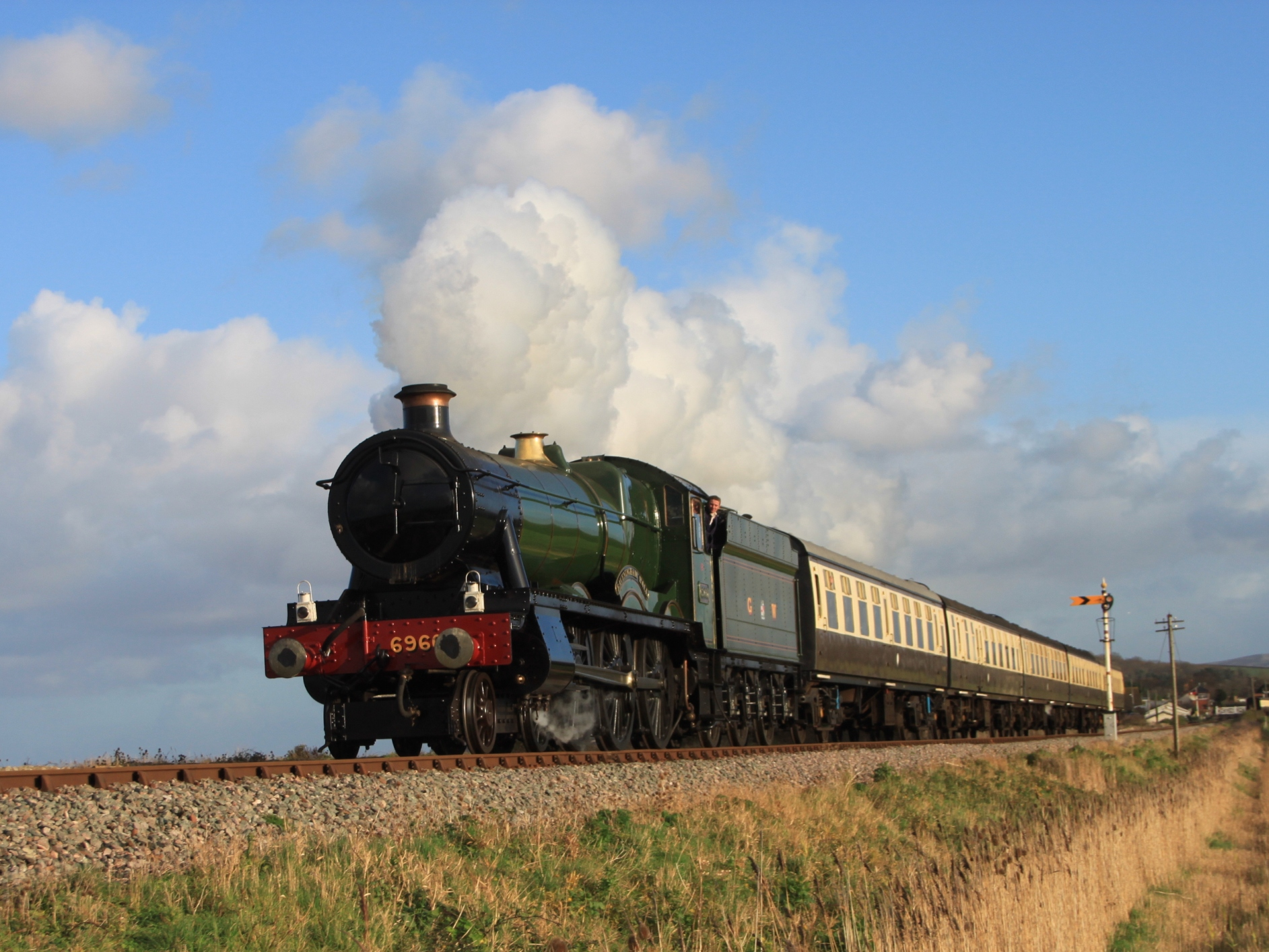
- 6960 "Raveningham Hall" departing Blue Anchor station on the West Somerset Railway
Type and origin
- Power type: Steam
- Designer: Frederick Hawksworth
- Build date: March 1944
Specifications
- Gauge: 4 ft 8 1/2 in (1,435 mm) standard gauge
Career
- Class: 6959 Modified Hall Class
- Retired: June 1964
- Restored: 1975
- Current owner: Jeremy Hosking
- Disposition: Static display at One:One Collection

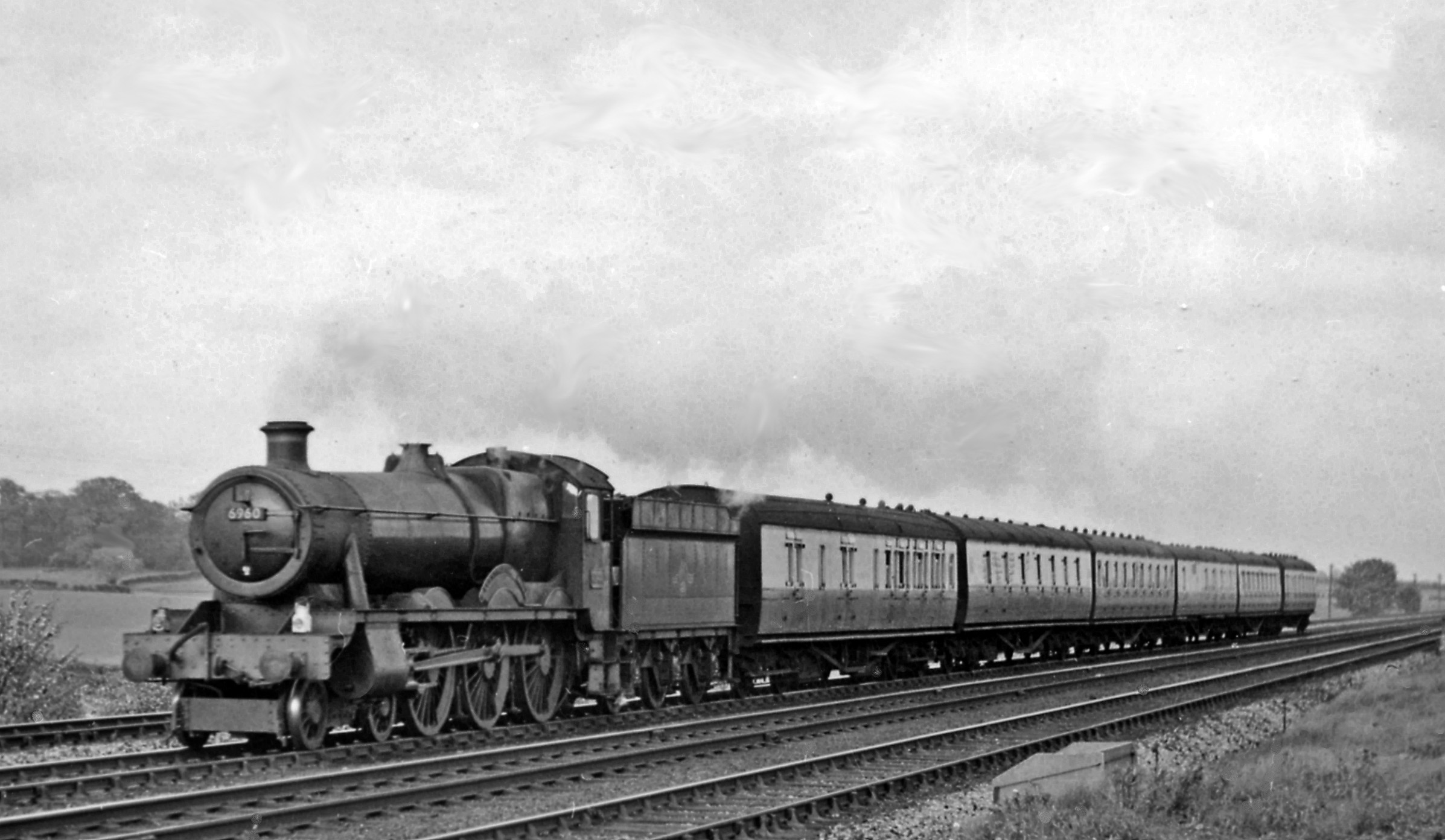
6960 Raveningham Hall in 1957

6960 Raveningham Hall is a Great Western Railway, 4-6-0 Modified Hall Class locomotive, built in March 1944 at Swindon Works to a design by Frederick Hawksworth. It is one of six of this class that survive in preservation. The locomotive is named after Raveningham Hall in Norfolk.

== Operation ==
Its first shed allocation was Old Oak Common with a transfer to Reading in September 1953, then to its last shed allocation Oxford in September 1963. The locomotive was withdrawn from service in June 1964 and sold to Woodham Brothers scrapyard in Barry, South Wales for cutting up.

== Preservation ==
6960 was saved for preservation and left the yard in October 1972 as the 26th departure from Barry having been acquired by David Edleston of Derby. It was eventually sold to Brian Thomas and moved to Steamtown Carnforth. Restored in 1975, the locomotive took part in the Stockton and Darlington Railway 150th Anniversary celebrations at Shildon.

In 1977 6960 moved to the Severn Valley Railway (SVR) where she ran with 4930 Hagley Hall's tender while her own was put behind 4930. In 1978 6960 became the first SVR-based locomotive to haul a rail tour on the main line.

Following a decision by the owner to sell the locomotive, 6960 left the SVR in late 1996, initially moving to the Gloucestershire Warwickshire Railway. Sold to Jeremy Hosking, by 2008 it was at The Flour Mill workshops in the Forest of Dean receiving a thorough overhaul. It was based at the West Somerset Railway but due to newly imposed weight restrictions, was transferred back to the SVR in May 2019 in exchange for the lighter 7802 Bradley Manor. In November 2019 it was decided that 6960 would remain at the SVR. After its boiler certificate expired in July 2021, it moved to the One:One Collection in Margate for static display.
