= Sir Charles Hastings, 1st Baronet =

British Army officer

General Sir Charles Hastings Bt GCH
- Born: March 12, 1752
- Died: September 30, 1823 (aged 71)
- Relatives: Francis Hastings, 10th Earl of Huntingdon (father); Frank Abney Hastings (son); Sir Charles Abney-Hastings (son)
- Military career
- Allegiance: Kingdom of Great Britain; United Kingdom
- Branch: British Army
- Rank: General
- Awards: Knight Grand Cross of the Royal Guelphic Order

General Sir Charles Hastings, 1st Baronet, GCH (12 March 1752 – 30 September 1823) was a British Army officer.

== Family ==
Hastings was the illegitimate son of Francis Hastings, 10th Earl of Huntingdon, and an unknown mother who was in fact a famous French courtesan, la demoiselle Lany, "danseuse de l'Opéra". He was born in Paris on 12 March 1752 and brought up in England.

He married Parnel Abney, the only daughter and heiress of Thomas Abney of Willesley Hall in Willesley, Derbyshire. Thomas Abney was the son of Sir Thomas Abney, Justice of the Common Pleas.

Hastings had two sons, Charles, born on 1 October 1792, and Frank, who was born on 6 February 1794, and a daughter, Selina, who died young.

He was created a baronet, of Willesley Hall in the County of Derby, on 18 February 1806. He was also a Knight Grand Cross of the Royal Guelphic Order. Hastings had an ancestral seat at Willesley from his marriage and a house in Harley Street in Middlesex.

Lady Hastings passed her life in seclusion and near blindness at their ancestral home.

== Military career ==
He purchased an ensigncy in the 12th Foot, in 1776 a Lieutenancy, and in 1780 a captaincy. In 1783, he purchased a majority in the 76th Foot, but by 1786 was a lieutenant-colonel on half-pay of the 72nd Foot. In 1786, he became Lieutenant-Colonel of the 34th Foot. In 1789, he retired on half-pay again, and during this time transferred to the 65th Foot. In 1798, he transferred to the 61st Foot as lieutenant-colonel and soon afterwards was promoted brevet colonel and major-general on the same day. In 1800, he became lieutenant-colonel of the 65th Foot. In 1806, he was promoted colonel of the 4th Foot, then transferred to the 77th Foot, and in 1811 returned to his old regiment, the 12th Foot. He was later promoted general.

Hastings died on 30 September 1823, at Willesley Hall. It has been claimed that he took his own life and that he had acorns buried with him. He was succeeded by his son, Charles, who changed his name to Abney-Hastings. His son Frank Abney Hastings fought at the Battle of Trafalgar and died at Zante.

Military offices
Preceded by William Picton	Colonel of the 12th Regiment of Foot; 1811–1823	Succeeded by Hon. Robert Meade
Preceded by Richard Lambart, 7th Earl of Cavan	Colonel of the 77th (East Middlesex) Regiment of Foot; 1811	Succeeded by Thomas Picton
Baronetage of the United Kingdom
New creation	Baronet (of Willesley Hall); 1806–1823	Succeeded by Charles Abney-Hastings
