= Willesley =

Village in Leicestershire, England

Coordinates: 52.735801°N 1.487351°W

- Village
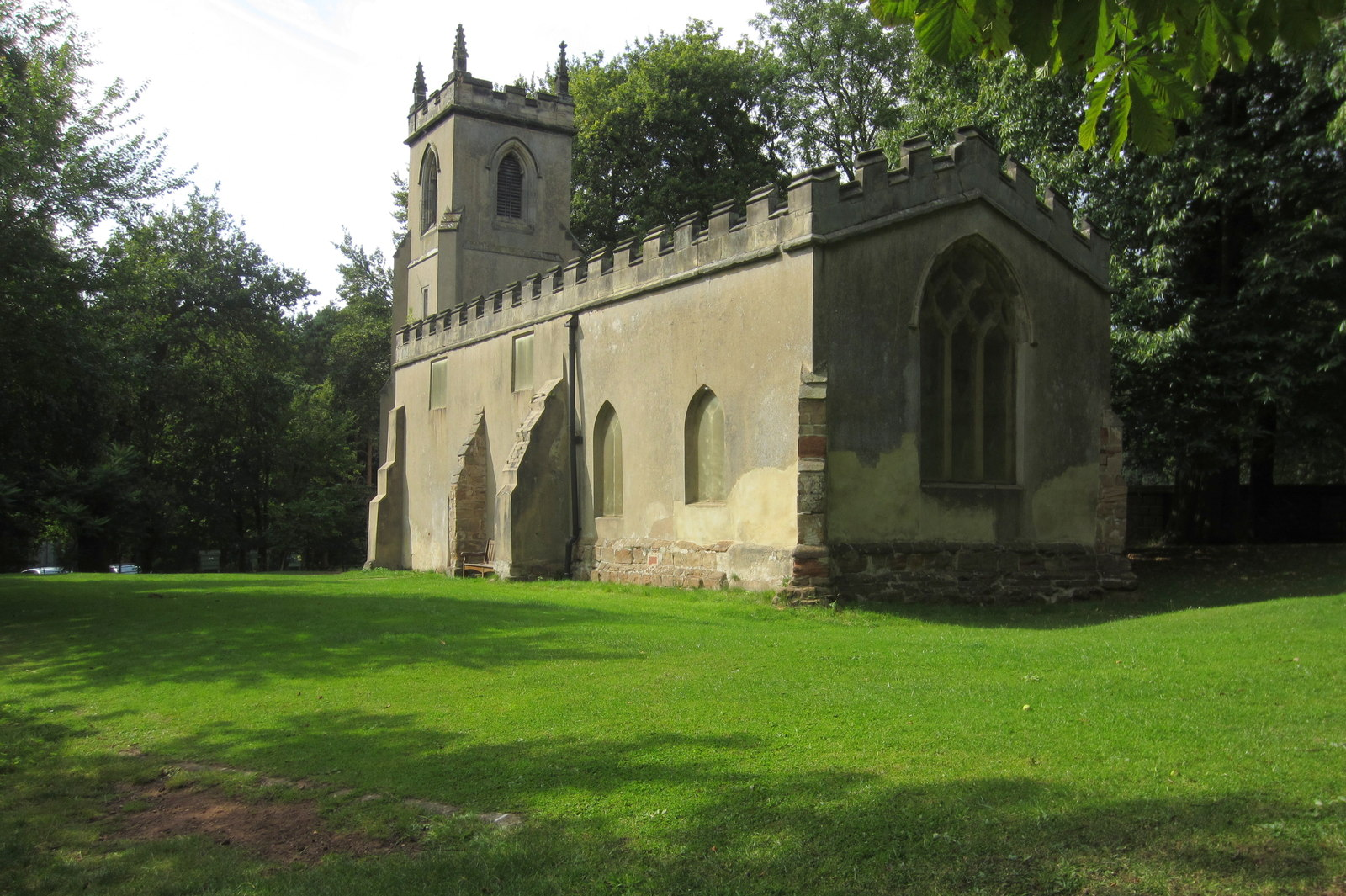
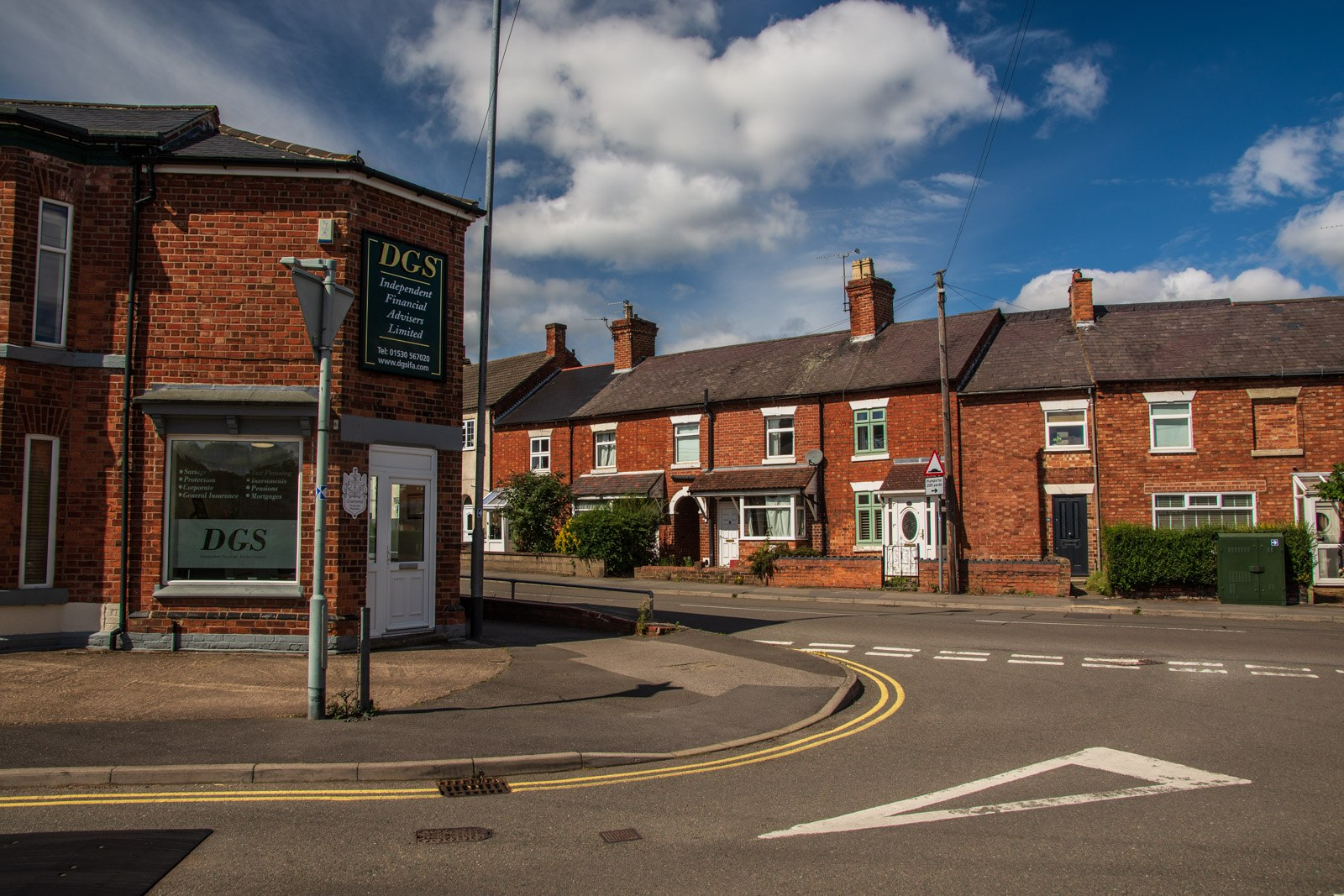
- Willesley Church and Tamworth Road

- Location within Leicestershire
- Population: 2,147 (2021 Census Ward Profile)
  - London: 115 mi (185 km) SE
- Civil parish: Ashby-de-la-Zouch
- District: North West Leicestershire
- Shire county: Leicestershire
- Region: East Midlands
- Country: England
- Sovereign state: United Kingdom
- Post town: ASHBY-DE-LA-ZOUCH
- Postcode district: LE65
- Dialling code: 01530
- Police: Leicestershire
- Fire: Leicestershire
- Ambulance: East Midlands
- UK Parliament: North West Leicestershire

Willesley is a historic village, ward and suburb of Ashby-de-la-Zouch, in Leicestershire, England. It was originally in Derbyshire and is now one of the wards of Ashby Town Council. Willesley Hall was the home of the Abney and later the Abney-Hastings family.

== History ==
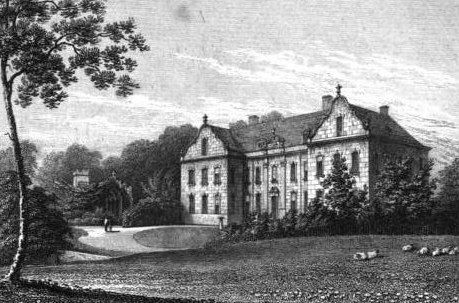
Willesley Hall in the 1830s, when it was the home of Sir Charles Abney Hastings and his father before that

Willesley is mentioned as a significant manor in the Domesday book. Willesley is listed among the large number of manors that are owned directly by Henry de Ferrers (Note: Henry owned a significant number of manors in Derbyshire; besides Willesley, he had Tissington, Hartington, Swarkeston and the new castle at Tutbury.) Its value was assessed as twenty shillings TRE (Note: TRE in Latin is Tempore Regis Edwardi; this means: in the time of Edward the Confessor, before the Battle of Hastings.) and sixteen shillings in 1086.

The village has always been small; the population remained around the figure of 60 from 1805 to 1881.

=== Willesley Hall ===
There was once a stately home here called Willesley Hall, built of red brick. The hall stood in a park of 155 acres (0.63 km^{2}). Little of the manor remains today, although the church and Willesley Lake both remain.

Willesley Hall was also used as the name of a steam locomotive, no. 6967, in the Hall class by the Great Western Railway.

=== Ashby Canal and mining ===
Ashby Canal ran along the southern side of the old estate and was used for moving coal and other minerals (limestone) from the area. A large basin was created at the south edge of the estate alongside the Oakthorpe Colliery from where tramways ran up through Ashby to Ticknall and along the route now of the A42.

Mining took place in this area from the 1600s and the first compensation record for mining subsidence was in this area in 1635. The mining rights to Oakthorpe Colliery will have belonged to the Willesley estate, probably until nationalisation in 1946. The lake in the lower part of Willesley Wood, near Oakthorpe, supposedly developed due to mining subsidence in the early 1980s.

=== Willesley Lake ===
The lake lies within the 155-acre park of the former Willesley Hall. It is a serpentine design and was constructed as a fishing and boating lake to allow the water level to be controlled for power generation for the Hall. It is designated as a ‘'Site of Ecological Interest’', feeding into the River Mease which is a special area of conservation and a Site of Special Scientific Interest (SSSI). The 24-acre fishing lake, set in 16 acres of woodland, provides an excellent fishery today, having a significant stock of fish species. It is surrounded by beds of snowdrops in February and bluebells in the spring; it attracts a significant number and species of waterfowl and other birds.

=== The Abney and Hastings family ===
It was the birthplace of several notable people, including two called Sir Thomas Abney and Edward Abney whose letters were published recently giving an insight into early 17th-century life. One of the Thomas Abney's became a mayor of London whilst another rose to be a judge of common pleas. The Abney family required that the owners of the manor should be called Abney. Twice there has had to be a special Act of Parliament for people to add the name Abney to their surname. Sir Charles Abney Hastings, a High Sheriff of Derbyshire was the last person descended from the Abney line. The man who might have inherited the hall, after Sir Charles Abney Hastings died without children, was his younger brother, Frank, a veteran of the Battle of Trafalgar; unfortunately, he died prematurely fighting for the Greeks and was buried in Zante.

=== 19th and 20th centuries ===
In 1897, the counties of Leicestershire and Derbyshire corrected their boundaries to remove enclaves. Part of Appleby Magna, Chilcote, Measham, Oakthorpe and part of Donisthorpe, and Stretton en le Field were transferred to Leicestershire. (Note: At the same time, the parishes of Netherseal and Overseal were received by Derbyshire from Leicestershire.)

The ancient parish of Willesley became a civil parish in 1866; on 1 April 1936, the parish was abolished and merged with Ashby de la Zouch, part also went to Oakthorpe and Donisthorpe and Measham. In 1931, the parish had a population of 80.

== Church of St Thomas ==
The church dates from the 14th century, with a tower added in 1845. The glass is modern heraldic, but includes some older glass. Monuments in the church include one dated 1505 to John and Maria Abney; another to George and Ellen Abney, dated 1571; (Note: The 1571 date refers to Ellen's death; George died in 1577.) and a Lt. General Sir Charles Hastings' black and white marble tomb who died in 1823.

The parish register started in 1677. In the 19th century, the church could seat 100, after its seats and pulpit were replaced in 1883 by the Earl of Loudoun. The Earls of Loudoun inherited the manor of Willesley, after the Second Baronet died without children.

== The campsite ==
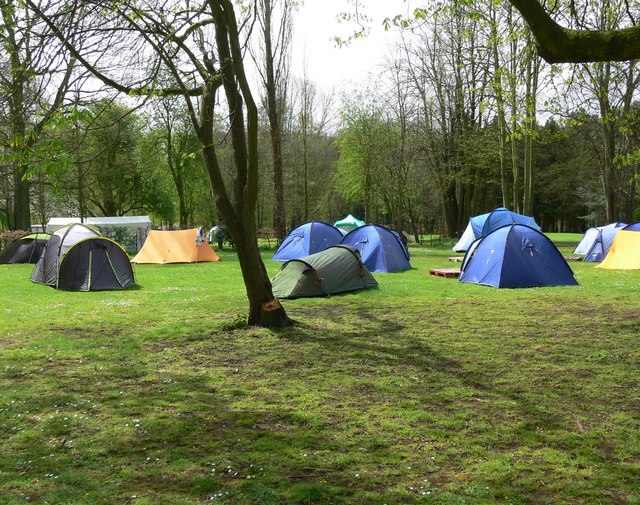
The Scout camp

The hall fell derelict and was bought by Leicestershire Scout district in 1952, along with a small area of land. The hall was demolished and the land became a Scout campsite; however, the hall required seven attempts before it gave way to explosives. Further land was later bought by the Scouts, with other areas becoming a fishing lake or adding to the golf facilities.

Willesley campsite is located 1 mile (1.6 km) south-west of Ashby-de-la-Zouch. It occupies 14 acres (57,000 m^{2}) of the old Willesley Hall estate; part of the original gatehouse is still visible). The campsite has fields, a wood and its church (St. Thomas's).

Some areas of woodland at Willesley are owned by the Woodland Trust. These areas were surveyed in 2001 for evidence of ancient woodland. The survey showed that there was a continuity of managed woodland cover for at least 200 years; there was no direct evidence of any continuity of cover since 1600, so the site did not therefore qualify as ancient woodland.

== Demographics ==
At the 2021 census, the ward profile population was 2,147. Of the findings, the ethnicity and religious composition of the ward was:

Ashby Willesley: Ethnicity: 2021 Census
Ethnic group	Population	%
White	2,075	96.6%
Mixed	37	1.7%
Asian or Asian British	30	1.4%
Black or Black British	5	0.2%
Total	2,147	100%

The religious composition of the ward at the 2021 Census was recorded as:

Ashby Willesley: Religion: 2021 Census
Religious	Population	%
Christian	1,091	54.3%
Irreligious	892	44.4%
Other religion	7	0.3%
Buddhist	6	0.3%
Muslim	5	0.3%
Hindu	4	0.2%
Jewish	2	0.1%
Sikh	1	0.1%
Total	2,147	100%

== Sport ==
Willesley Park golf course is set in the heart of the National Forest, with views of the Leicestershire countryside. It is a heath and parkland course, which been on its present site since 1920 when the land was leased from the 11th Earl of Loudoun.
