= Thomas Pestell (born 1613) =

English clergyman (1613–1701)

Thomas Pestell (1613–1701) was an English clergyman.

Pestell was the son of Thomas Pestell, and was born in Coleorton. Like his father, Pestell graduated from Queens' College, Cambridge ( B.A., 1633; M.A., 1636). He succeeded his father as vicar of Packington, Leicestershire in 1644, but was ejected by Parliamentary troops in 1646, during the First English Civil War. That year Pestell and his father were called before a Parliamentary Committee to answer charges of delinquency; the accuser was a parishioner who seems to have acted out of malice.

Pestell served for a while as vicar of Markfield before being restored to Packington in 1662.

Although he was not a poet of the same stature of his father, Pestell contributed verses to Lachrymae Musarum (1649) in memory of Henry, Lord Hastings. He appears to have written a Latin play called Versipellis (now lost), which was performed at Cambridge.
