= Thomas Abney (judge) =

English barrister and judge

Sir Thomas Abney (1690 or 1691 – 1750) was an English barrister and later judge. He was baptized at Willesley, Derbyshire (now in Leicestershire) on 30 April 1691 and was the younger son of Sir Edward Abney (who in turn was the elder brother of Sir Thomas Abney, Lord Mayor of London), by his second wife, Judith, daughter and co-heir of Peter Barr, of London.

He matriculated at Wadham College, Oxford, on 2 December 1707, aged 16. He became a King's Counsel in 1733, Attorney-General for the Duchy of Lancaster in 1733, Judge of the Marshalsea Court (at which time he was also knighted) in 1735, Steward and one of the Judges of the Marshalsea Court in 1736, in November 1740 a Baron of the Exchequer, and in February 1743 a Justice of the Common Pleas. Abney fell a victim to the gaol distemper at the 'Black Sessions' at the Old Bailey in May 1750, when, "of the judges in the commission, only the chief justice, (Lee) and the recorder (Adams) escaped. Those who fell a sacrifice to the pestilence were Mr. Justice Abney, who died 19 May; Mr. Baron Clarke, who died on the 17th; Sir Samuel Pennant, lord mayor; and alderman Sir Daniel Lambert; besides several of the counsel and jurymen." He was buried in Derbyshire (now in Leicestershire) with his ancestors. His wife died at Ashby de la Zouch in 1761, and his son Thomas in 1791.
