= GWR 6959 Class 6990 Witherslack Hall =

Preserved British steam locomotive

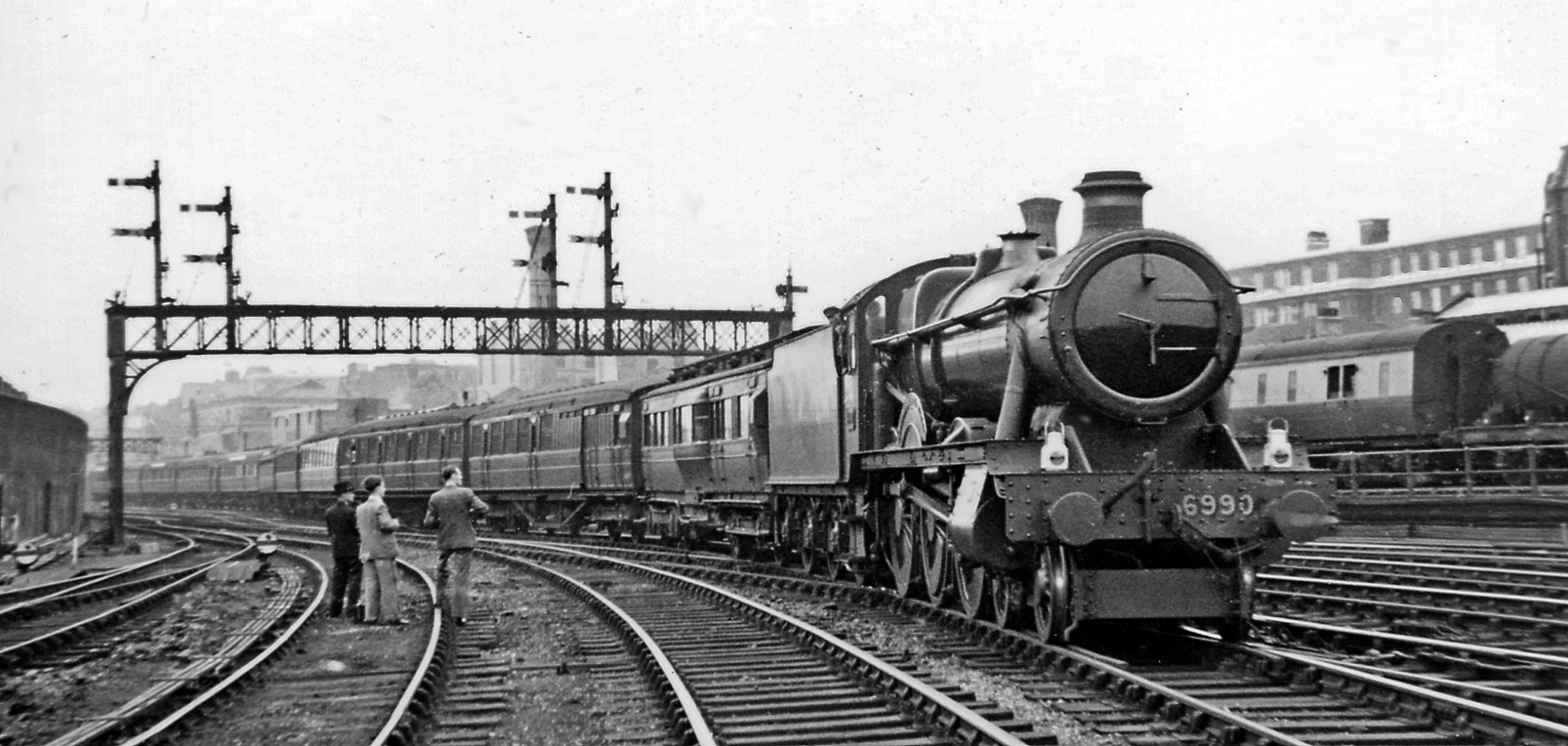
- Witherslack Hall during the 1948 locomotive exchange trials
Type and origin
- Power type: Steam
- Designer: Frederick Hawksworth
- Builder: Swindon Works
- Build date: 1948
Specifications
- Configuration
  - Whyte: 4-6-0
- Gauge: 4 ft 8 1/2 in (1,435 mm)
Career
- Operators: British Railways
- Numbers: 6990
- Locale: Western Region of British Railways
- Withdrawn: January 1966
- Current owner: Witherslack Hall Locomotive Society

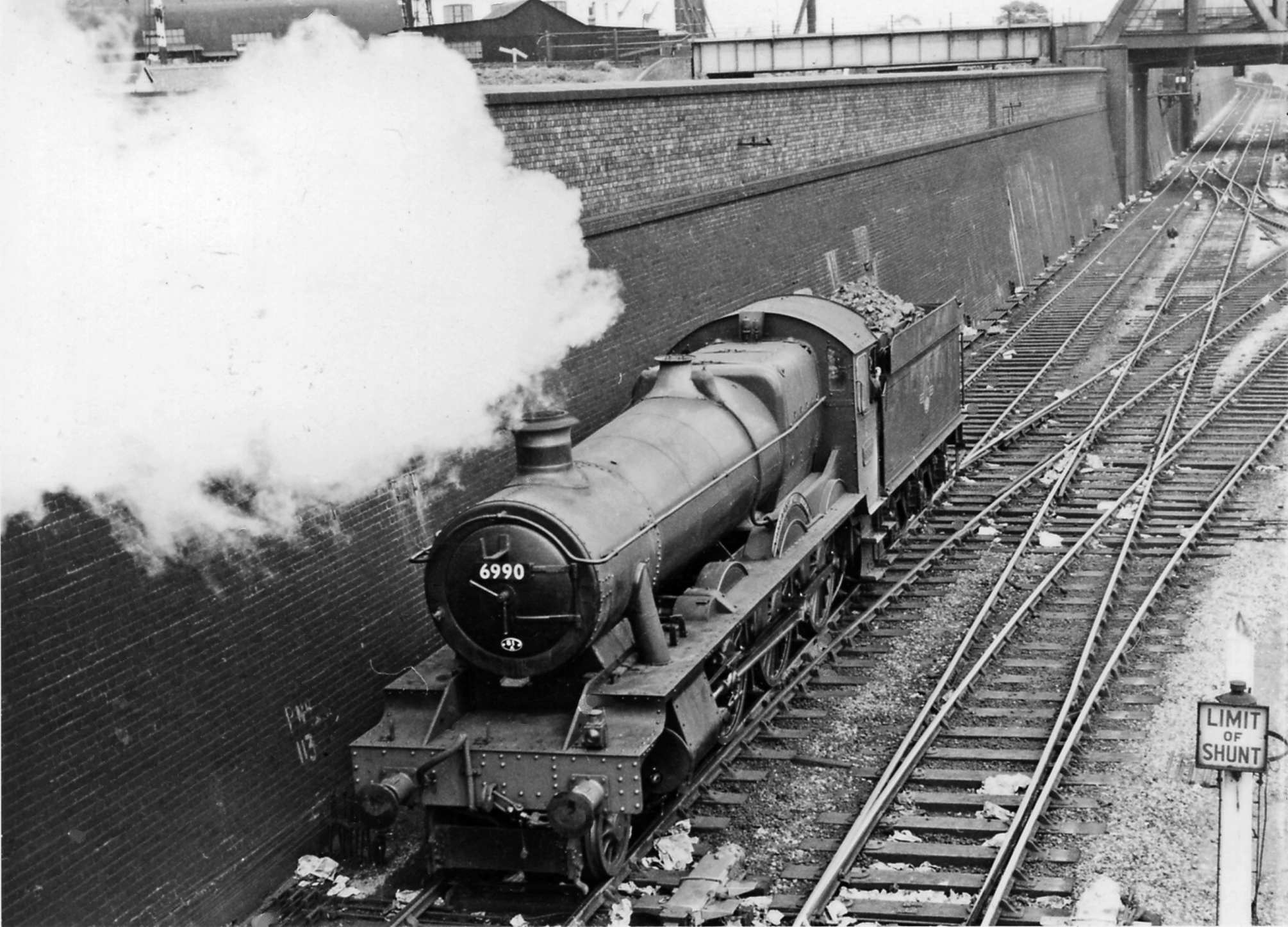
6990 Witherslack Hall in 1962

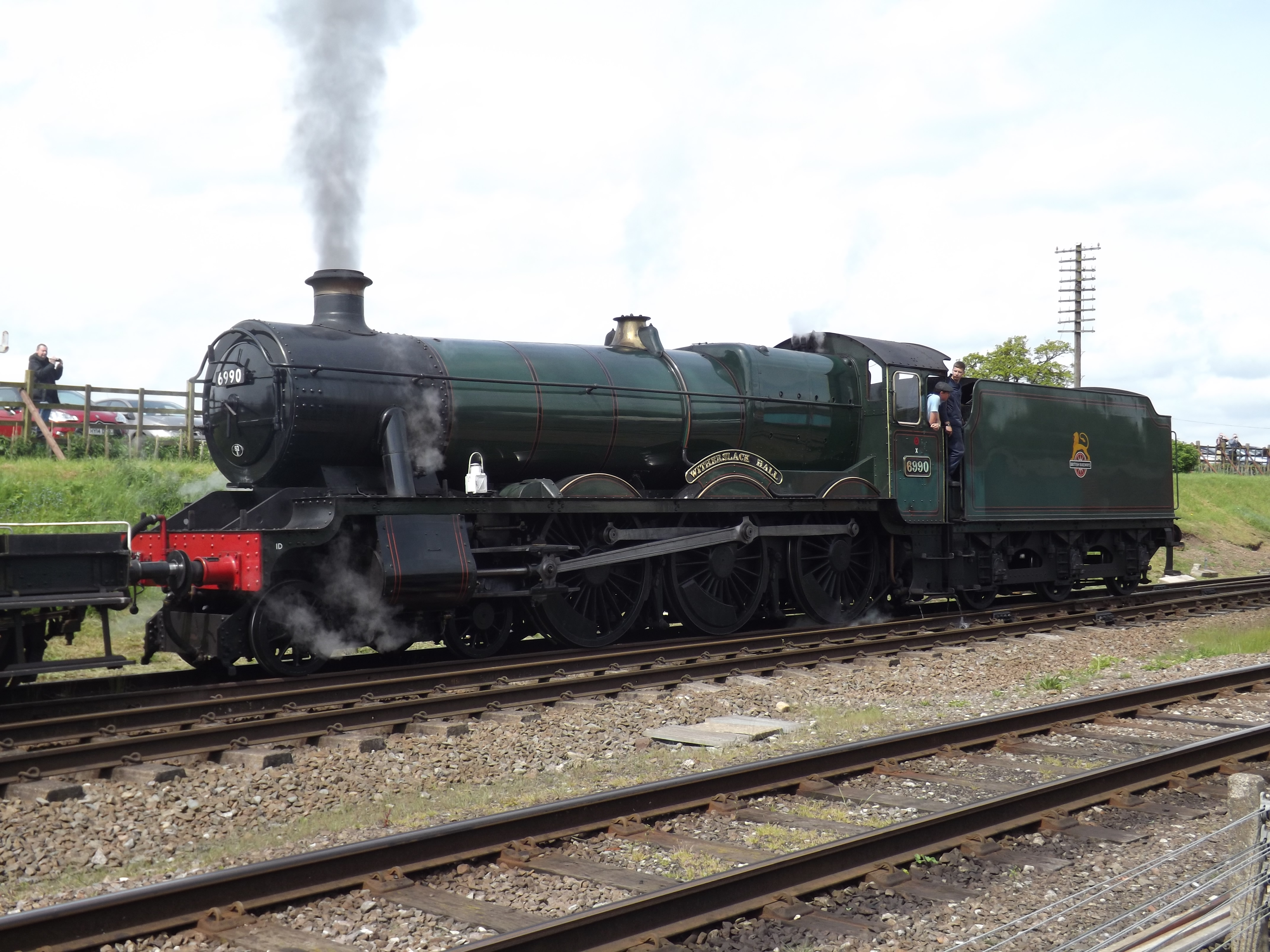
Witherslack Hall at Quorn & Woodhouse in May 2018

6990 Witherslack Hall is a steam locomotive. It was built at Swindon by British Railways to a Great Western Railway design in 1948. It took part in the 1948 Locomotive Trials, on 24th and 25 June 1948, running on the Great Central Main Line from Marylebone.

== Preservation ==
It was withdrawn in January 1966. It was bought by the Witherslack Hall Locomotive Society and it arrived on the Great Central Railway in November 1975, having operated on the line during its BR days. Restoration was completed in 1986 and the locomotive operated until 2001 when it was withdrawn for overhaul. After 14 years out of service, 6990's overhaul was completed in October 2015 and was operating at the GCR. The locomotive visited East Lancashire Railway for the 2017 and 2018 summer season. During the engines overhaul it also had its Collett tender swapped with 4930 Hagley Hall's Hawksworth tender, the latter going to 4930.

In 2019, the locomotive visited the North Yorkshire Moors Railway for its annual steam gala on Friday 27 September to Sunday 29 September.
