= Frank Abney Hastings =

British Royal Navy officer (1794–1828)

Captain Frank Abney Hastings
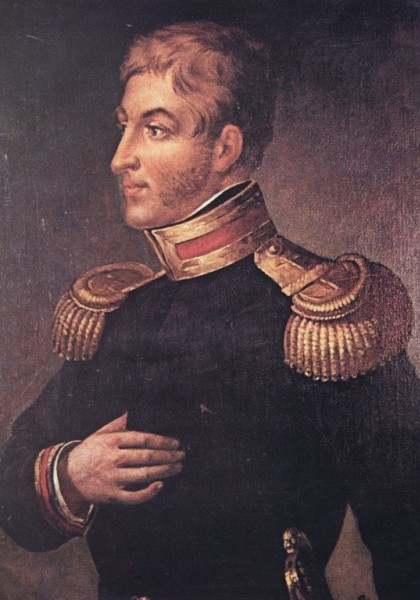
- Posthumous Portrait by Spyridon Prosalentis
- Born: 14 February 1794; Leicestershire, United Kingdom
- Died: 1 June 1828 (aged 34); Zakynthos, United States of the Ionian Islands
- Burial place: Poros, Greece
- Military career
- Allegiance: United Kingdom (Greece) First Hellenic Republic
- Branch: Royal Navy; Hellenic Navy
- Rank: Captain
- Units: Neptune
- Commands: Karteria
- Conflicts: War of the Third Coalition; Battle of Trafalgar; War of 1812; Battle of New Orleans; Greek War of Independence; Battle of Itea

Frank Abney Hastings (Greek: Φραγκίσκος Άστιγξ) (14 February 1794 – 1 June 1828) was a British naval officer and Philhellene. Born to a noble British family, he served in the Royal Navy, seeing action at the Battle of Trafalgar and the Battle of New Orleans. In 1819 he was discharged from the Royal Navy, and a few years later would travel to Greece to aid the Greeks in their struggle for independence, where he would take part in multiple battles, most notably the Battle of Itea, during which his ship the Karteria, would become the first steam-powered warship to see combat.

== Early life and career ==
He was the son of Sir Charles Hastings of Willesley Hall, a natural son of Francis Hastings, 10th Earl of Huntingdon. He entered the British Navy in 1805, and was in the Neptune (100) at the Battle of Trafalgar. He also took part in the Battle of New Orleans; but in 1819 a quarrel with his flag captain led to his leaving the service. The revolutionary troubles of the time offered chances of foreign employment. Hastings spent a year on the continent to learn French, and sailed for Greece on 12 March 1822 from Marseille. On 3 April he reached Hydra. For two years he took part in the naval operations of the Greeks in the Gulf of Smyrna and elsewhere.

== Writings ==
He saw that the light squadrons of the Greeks must in the end be overpowered by the heavier Turkish navy, clumsy as it was; and in 1823 he drew up and presented to Lord Byron a very able memorandum which he laid before the Greek government in 1824. This paper is of particular interest apart from its importance in the Greek insurrection, for it contains the germs of the great revolution which has since been effected in naval gunnery and tactics. In substance the memorandum advocated the use of steamers in preference to sailing ships, and of direct fire with shells and hot shot, as a more trustworthy means of destroying the Turkish fleet than fire-ships. It will be found in George Finlay's History of the Greek Revolution, vol. ii. appendix i. Lack of resources prevented the full application of Hastings's plans; but by the use of his own money, of which he is said to have spent £7,000, he was able to some extent to carry them out.

== Later adventures ==
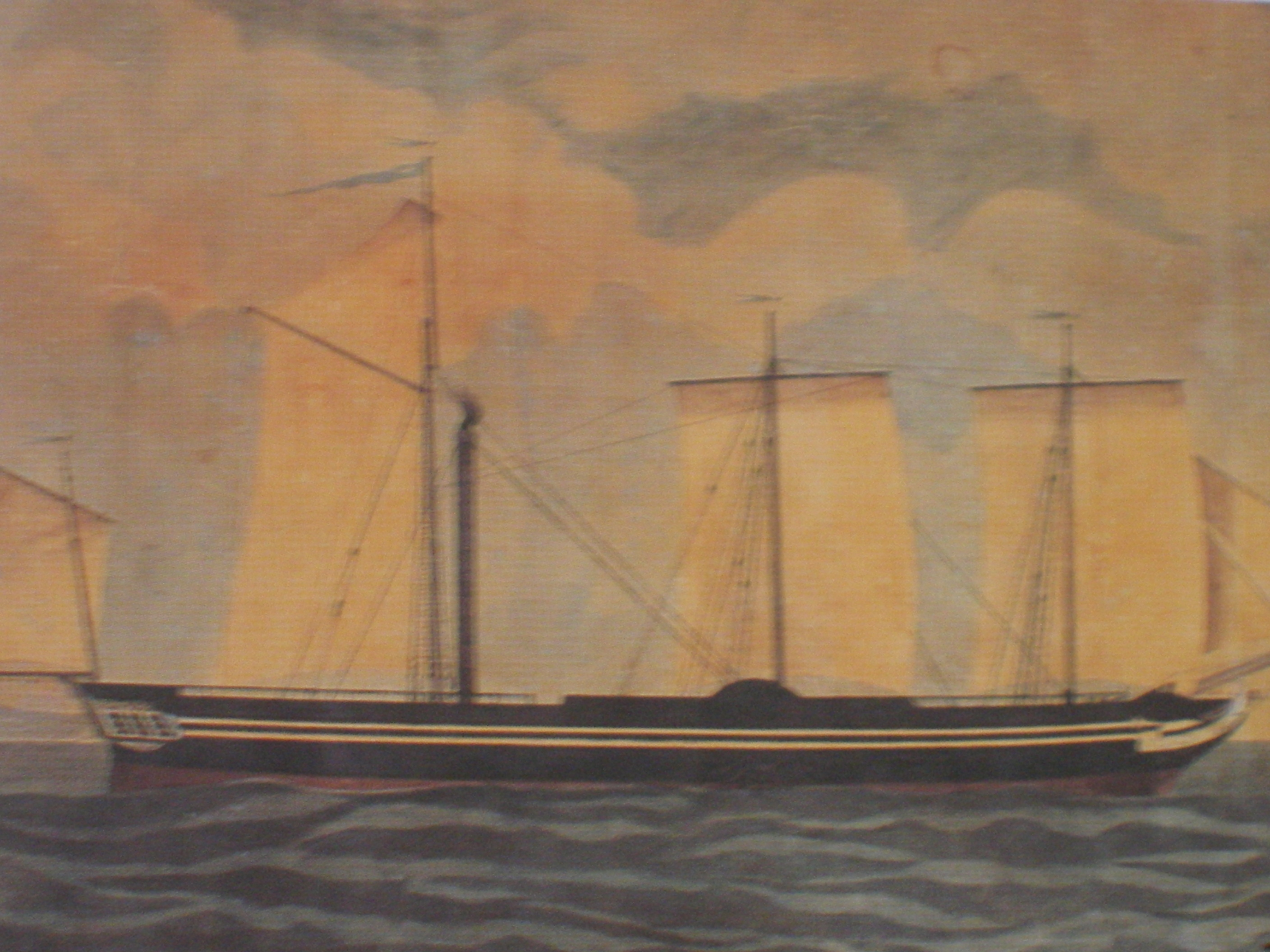
Watercolor of the flagship Karteria

In 1824, he came to England to obtain a steamer, and in 1825 he had fitted out a small steamer named the Karteria ("Perseverance"), manned by Englishmen, Swedes and Greeks, and provided with apparatus for the discharge of shell and hot shot. He did enough to show that if his advice had been vigorously followed the Turks would have been driven off the sea long before the date of the battle of Navarino. The great effect produced by his shells in an attack on the sea-line of communication of the Turkish army, then besieging Athens at Oropos and Volos in March and April 1827, was a clear proof that much more could have been done.

Military mismanagement caused the defeat of the Greeks round Athens. But Hastings, in co-operation with General Richard Church, shifted the scene of the attack to western Greece. Here his destruction of a small Turkish squadron at Salona Bay in the Gulf of Corinth (29 September 1827) provoked Ibrahim Pasha into the aggressive movements which led to the destruction of his fleet by the allies at Navarino on 20 October 1827.

== Death ==
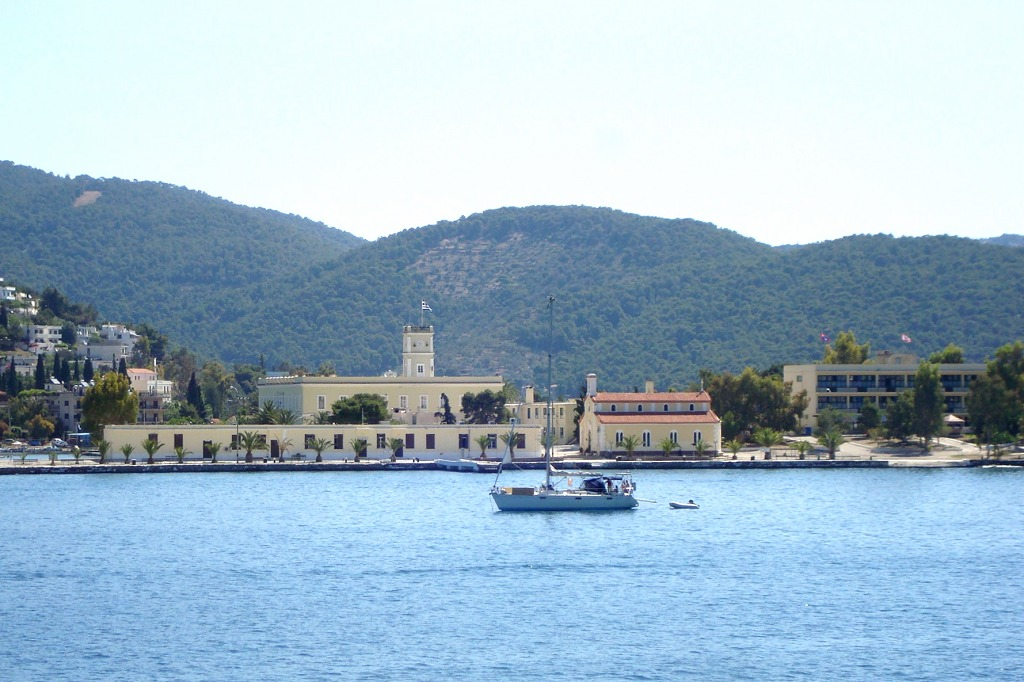
The old arsenal, now a Naval Academy where Hastings is buried

On 25 May 1828 he was wounded in an attempt to reclaim Missolonghi, and he died a few days later from his injuries in Zakynthos on 1 June. Greece held a national funeral in honor of him. He was laid to rest beneath the arsenal of Poros, today a Hellenic Naval Academy, and his heart is preserved in the Anglican Church in Athens. Multiple monuments in Greece were built in his honour, and several streets were named after him. General Gordon, who served in the war and wrote its history, says of him: "If ever there was a disinterested and really useful Philhellene it was Hastings. He received no pay, and had expended most of his slender fortune in keeping the Karteria afloat for the last six months. His ship, too, was the only one in the Greek navy where regular discipline was maintained.
