= List of rolling stock preserved on the West Somerset Railway =

West Somerset Railway
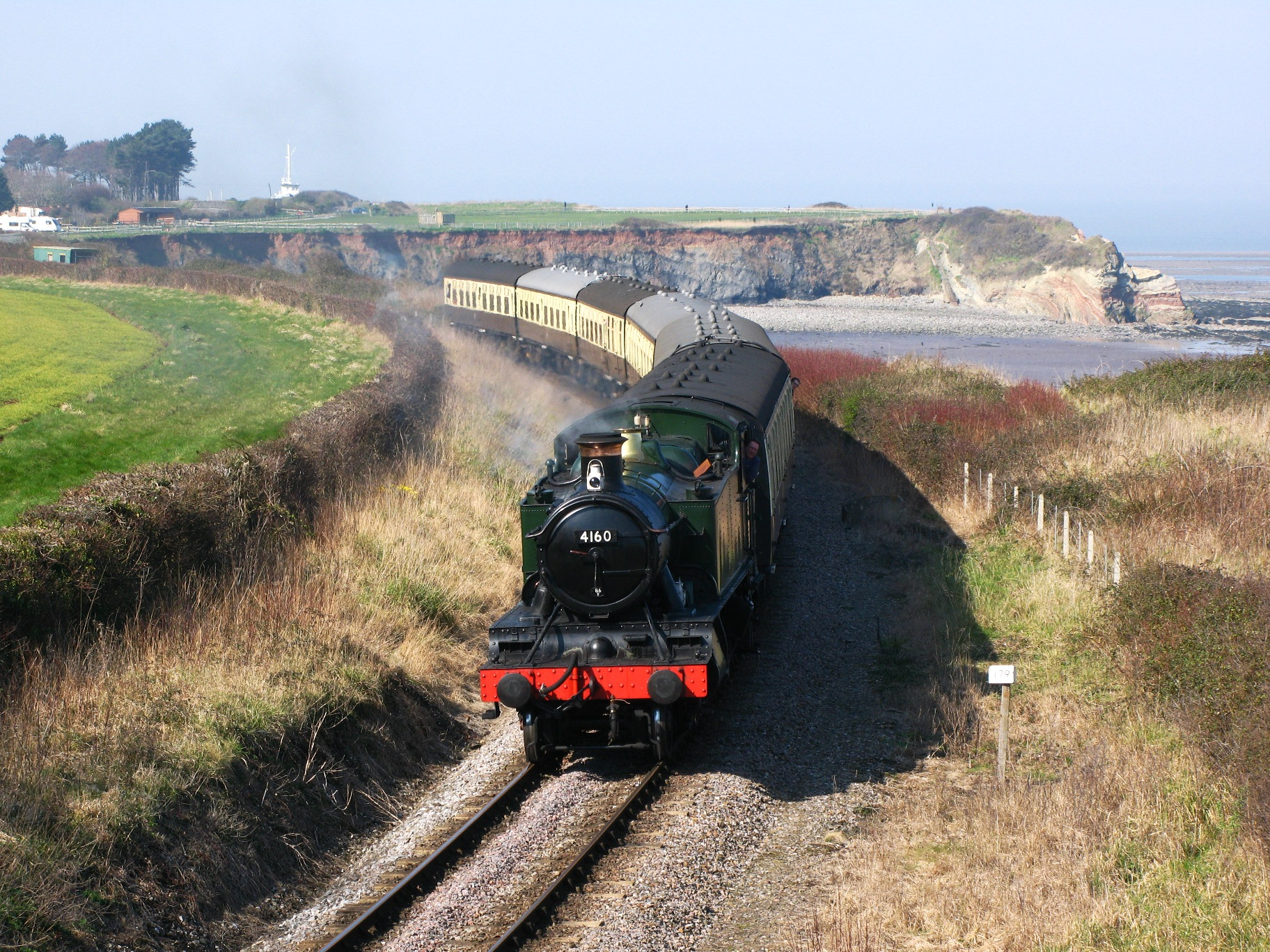
- Locale: Minehead, Somerset, England
- Terminus: Minehead; Bishops Lydeard

Commercial operations
- Built by: West Somerset Railway; Minehead Railway
- Original gauge: 7 ft (2,134 mm) to 1882; 4 ft 8 1/2 in (1,435 mm) since

Preserved operations
- Operated by: West Somerset Railway
- Stations: 11
- Length: 22.75 miles (36.61 km)
- Preserved gauge: 4 ft 8 1/2 in (1,435 mm)
- 1862: Opened to Watchet
- 1874: Line completed
- 1882: Converted to standard gauge
- 1971: Closed

Preservation history
- 1975: Light Railway Order granted
- 1976: Line (between Minehead and Williton) re-opened
- 1978: Stogumber re-opens
- 1979: Bishop's Lydeard & Crowcombe Heathfield both re-open
- 1981: Line marked 10th anniversary of closure
- 1987: Doniford Beach Halt opens
- 2009: Norton Fitzwarren re-opens
- Headquarters: Minehead

The rolling stock preserved on the West Somerset Railway is used to operate trains on the West Somerset Railway (WSR), a heritage railway in Somerset, England. There is a variety of preserved steam and diesel locomotives and diesel multiple units, passenger coaches and goods wagons. Most of these are typical of Great Western Railway (GWR) branch lines in Somerset, or of the Somerset and Dorset Joint Railway (SDJR). Some are owned by the railway itself but most are owned by various individuals or voluntary groups such as the West Somerset Railway Association (WSRA), Diesel and Electric Preservation Group (DEPG), and Somerset and Dorset Railway Trust (SDRT).

The line is also regularly visited by locomotives based elsewhere. Some come for a day on a railtour, others for a few days or weeks to take part in a special gala, but a few stay for many months and form part of the stock working scheduled trains. Over the years these have included well known locomotives such as City of Truro, Taw Valley, Duke of Gloucester, Evening Star, Royal Scot, Tornado, Bittern, Britannia, Sir Lamiel and King Edward I.

== Maintenance facilities ==
The old goods shed at Minehead has been converted to an engine shed for inspections and running repairs to the operational locomotives. A secure compound at Bishops Lydeard is the base for locomotives working from that end of the line. Most diesel locomotives work from the DEPG depot at Williton. The permanent way department is based at Dunster and maintain their wagons in the old goods shed there.

Restoration and heavy repairs are undertaken at several locations, including workshops attached to the engine sheds at Minehead and Williton. There is also another shed at Williton used for steam locomotive restoration and vintage coaches, the operating coaches are maintained in a modern shed at Minehead, and the SDRT have workshops at their museum at Washford.

== Steam locomotives ==
The following locomotives are currently based on the West Somerset Railway but may sometimes be away from the line.

Image	Class	Wheels	Number & name	Built	To WSR	Notes
	GWR 4500	2-6-2T	4561	1924		The 'small prairie' locomotives were designed for lighter duties on often lengthy branch lines. The 4500 Class were introduced in 1906. 4561 was built in 1924, working initially in the Birmingham area for three years before moving southwards, settling in Truro from 1938. Twenty years later it moved to Newton Abbot from where it regularly worked the Kingsbridge branch line. In 1962 it was sold for scrap to the Woodham Brothers. It was purchased by the WSRA in 1975 and was placed in service in 1989. It was taken out of service in 1998 when its boiler certificate expired and is now undergoing a full overhaul.
	GWR 4575	2-6-2T	5542	1928	1975	The 4575 class, similar to the 4500 Class represented by here 4561, but with a larger water tank and other improvements. 5542 was turned out from Swindon in 1928 and sent to Gloucester but it then moved southwards and even spent a time based at Taunton. Withdrawn in 1961, the following year it too was sold to the Woodham Brothers and spent 13 years at Barry before being brought by the WSRA. Restoration took until 2002 and it is now in service in GWR unlined green livery. As it is a little underpowered for the heavy trains that now run on the railway it often spends long periods working on other railways.
	BR Standard Class 4 2-6-4T	2-6-4T	80064	1953	2023	Allocated to both the London Midland and Southern Regions during its lifetime, the locomotive was withdrawn from BR service at Bristol Barrow Road in September 1965. After being purchased from Barry scrapyard in 1973 by the 80064 Locomotive Fund, it was initially restored at the South Devon Railway in 1981, before being moved to the Bluebell Railway in 1984. The owning group donated the locomotive to the WSRA in 2023 and the locomotive was subsequently moved to the railway. The locomotive's boiler is being overhauled by Riley & Son in Lancashire, whilst the chassis was moved to Cranmore on the East Somerset Railway for overhaul in April 2026, where the locomotive is hoped to return to steam in the summer of 2028 after a period of running in.
	GWR 5101	2-6-2T	5199	1934	2021	5199 spent most of its service career on GWR's Birmingham suburban lines, working local passenger trains. It was retired in 1963 when steam services were taken over by railcars, and remained in storage at Barry Scrapyard for 22 years. Its first home in preservation was the Gloucestershire Warwickshire Railway, where restoration was originally started, but it moved to Long Marston MoD and later Llangollen for the completion of its overhaul, finally returning to steam in 2003. It initially came to the West Somerset Railway for the 2021 season.
	GWR 6400	0-6-0PT	6435	1937	2024	Another 'pannier tank' engine, this class was fitted with equipment for working Auto trains. 6435 was withdrawn on 12 October 1964 and entered preservation with the Dart Valley Railway on 17 October 1965. It was transferred to the Torbay Steam Railway but was then moved to the Bodmin and Wenford Railway before being sold to the West Somerset Railway in 2024.
	GWR 7800	4-6-0	7821 Ditcheat Manor	1950		The 'Manor' Class was designed by Charles Collett as a large lightweight locomotive for long but lightly constructed routes, mainly in west Wales and south west England. Construction of the first 20 started at Swindon in 1938, followed by another 10 in 1950 for British Railways. 7821 Ditcheat Manor is now the property of the WSRA. It was moved in 2010 to Swindon's Steam Museum where it was displayed for eight years. In August 2018 it moved to the nearby Swindon Designer Outlet for display.
	GWR 7800	4-6-0	7822 Foxcote Manor	1950	2018	Designed with a lighter axle loading than the red-rating of the other GWR mixed traffic Hall and Grange 4-6-0 classes, the Manor class were ideally suited to the lightweight cross country and coastal routes of the former Cambrian Railways. 7822 was always based on the former Cambrian Railways. Its first allocation was to Oswestry depot. Withdrawn in 1965 from Shrewsbury, it was towed to Woodham Brothers scrapyard in Barry, South Wales. It was saved from there in 1974, when it was moved to Oswestry, the then headquarters of the Cambrian Railways Society. In 1978 it was moved to the Llangollen Railway where it returned to service in 1988.
	GWR 7800	4-6-0	7828 Odney Manor	1950	2004	Initially based at Shrewsbury shed, it moved to Croes Newydd in 1961, Aberystwyth in 1963 for a short while, then returned to Shrewsbury, from where it was withdrawn in 1965, moving to Barry scrapyard in 1966. It was rescued privately in 1981 and moved to the Gloucestershire Warwickshire Railway where restoration was completed by 1987. It worked on the Gwilli Railway, Llangollen Railway, and East Lancashire Railway, before coming to the WSR in 1995. Its owners sold it to the WSR in 2004. On 17 June 2011 it was temporarily renamed Norton Manor (the name intended for cancelled locomotive 7830) after 40 Commando's base alongside the railway at Norton Fitzwarren. It has been repainted in the BR lined green livery that it carried in 1957.
	GWR 9351	2-6-0	9351			Great Western locomotives were assembled in different configurations from a range of standardised components. The basic parts of the 'large prairie' 2-6-2Ts were considered at different times as being the possible basis of a small 2-6-0 'Mogul', but this was never followed through. 5193 was purchased for preservation in 1979 and moved from Barry Island to Steamport Southport where restoration to running order was planned, but prevented by lack of funding. 5193 was purchased by the West Somerset Railway in 1998 and moved to Minehead where restoration to running order was to be undertaken. Because of the degree of work needed to restore it as a tank locomotive, and because a small tender locomotive was thought to be more useful on the lengthy railway, it was decided in 2000 to convert it to the mooted 2-6-0 design. Work was completed in 2004 when it appeared in plain GWR green livery.
	GWR 9400	0-6-0	9466	1952	2019	Formerly based at the Buckinghamshire Railway Centre the locomotive was subsequently sold to JJP Holdings South West Ltd and was based at the West Somerset Railway after a short return visit to the Mid-Norfolk Railway. It was resident at the Ecclesbourne Valley Railway but moved back to the West Somerset Railway in early 2022 where it will operate until its boiler certificate expires in 2025.

== Diesel locomotives ==
Image	Class	Number	Built	To WSR	Notes
	Class 52	D1010	1962	1991	The 'Western' class were the last and most powerful of the Western Region's diesel-hydraulics. D1010 Western Campaigner was built at Swindon in 1962 and was initially based at Old Oak Common TMD in London. After just 14 months it moved to Laira which was to be its most familiar depot, but it did spend a short time working out of Landore TMD in Wales during 1968. 1010 was bought by Foster Yeoman after being withdrawn by British Rail in 1977 and was moved to their depot at Merehead. The locomotive moved to Didcot Railway Centre in 1985 where it was restored to working order. A further move saw it brought to the WSR in 1991 and it was then sold to the DEPG who had been responsible for its restoration and operation. During its time with Foster Yeoman it assumed the identity of 1035 Western Yeoman but it returned to its original number and name in 1992. It is painted in British Railways maroon livery.
	Class 47	D1661 (47077)	1965	2009	The Class 47, or 'Brush Type 4', was the British Railways standard large diesel-electric locomotive of the mid-1960s and was designed to operate similar trains to the 'Westerns'. Only a few were initially allocated to the Western Region and most of these were given names that had originally been carried by Great Western Railway locomotives, in D1661's case this dated back to the broad gauge Star Class but the North Star name had also been carried by four other GWR locomotives, the most recent being Castle Class 4000. D1661 received its name in a ceremony performed by Ray Gunter, the Minister of Labour, at London Paddington station on 20 March 1965. It was allocated to Landore TMD until 1973 when it was transferred to Old Oak Common, after which it moved around various sheds. Its number was changed to 47077 under the TOPS scheme in 1974 and then became 47613 when fitted with electric train heating equipment ten years later. In 1989 it was rebuilt with additional fuel tanks which caused it to be renumbered again as 47840. It was part of the Virgin CrossCountry fleet until 2002 and then was hired to various operators by its owner, Porterbrook. It was finally withdrawn in 2008, repainted into two-tone British Railways Green livery, renumbered back to D1661, and sent to the WSR. It has been part of the DEPG fleet based at Williton since 2009 although in January 2022 it was sent on loan to the North Yorkshire Moors Railway for a two-year period.
	Class 33	D6566	1961	1997	D6566 (later number 33046) entered service on the Southern Region of British Railways in 1961 and was withdrawn in 1995. It arrived on the West Somerset railway in 1997 and was the first Class 33/0 to operate in preservation. It was withdrawn for an overhaul in 2013 which was completed in 2018 when it was painted in BR green livery.
	Class 33	D6575	1961	1997	6575 became 33057 in 1973 and spent most of its working life at Hither Green TMD from where it was withdrawn in 1995 but was retained for staff training until sold to a private buyer for preservation in 1997 when it moved to the WSR. It carries British Rail green livery with full yellow ends. 6575 was also based at Hither Green until 1985 after when it spent time at both Stewarts Lane TMD and Eastleigh TMD; from 1991 it carried the name Seagull. It was withdrawn in 1997 and eventually sold to freight operator Direct Rail Services, however it was never put into traffic and instead was sold to a private buyer and moved to the WSR in 2005. It was intended to be a source of spares for 6566, however its restoration was started in February 2010. It also carries green livery but with the original half-height yellow ends.
	Class 35	D7017	1962	1976	The 'Hymek' class of diesel-hydraulics were built by Beyer Peacock for working both passenger and freight services on the Western Region of British Railways. D7017 was delivered to Bristol Bath Road TMD in January 1962. It was transferred to Old Oak Common in 1971 and was withdrawn in 1975. It was sold to the Diesel and Electric Group and brought to Taunton, arriving on the West Somerset Railway on 25 March 1976. It is painted in British Rail green livery.
	Class 35	D7018	1962	1990	7018 like 7017 was withdrawn in 1975 and initially preserved at Didcot Railway Centre. It was later moved to the West Somerset Railway but suffered a major failure in 1995. It returned to service in 2019, painted in British Rail green livery.
	Class 14	D9518	1964	2011	The Class 14 were small diesel-hydraulic locomotives built at Swindon for working Western Region branch lines but they were soon surplus to requirements as these were closed following the Reshaping of British Railways report. 9518 entered service in October 1964 at Cardiff Canton and worked from there until placed in store April 1969. It was sold to the National Coal Board for use at Ashington Colliery in Northumberland. After it was no longer needed by the NCB, it went to the Nene Valley Railway to provide spare parts for other Class 14s that were based there. Late in 2011 it was moved to Williton and there are long-term plans to restore it to service.
	Class 14	D9526	1965	1980	9526 was delivered to Bristol Bath Road in January 1965, joined 9518 at Cardiff Canton in May 1967 but was withdrawn before the end of 1968. It was then purchased by Blue Circle Industries to shunt the sidings at their cement factory at Westbury alongside the Taunton to London line. It was sold to the DEPG in 1979 and arrived on the WSR on 3 April 1980. Restoration was completed in 1984; it carries British Railways green livery and is used on freight or light passenger trains. Another Class 14, D9551, also worked on the West Somerset Railway for many years but has now moved elsewhere.
	Class 03	D2133	1960	1994	Built at Swindon railway works in 1960, 2133 spent many years based at Taunton and working in various goods yards in the area. After just nine years working with BR it was sold to British Cellophane for shunting their factory sidings at Bridgwater. It was no longer needed in 1994 and so was donated to the WSR by Courtaulds, the then owner of the site. It carries BR green livery and can usually be found working as the station pilot at Minehead. A second Class 03, number 03119, was based on the railway from 1996 until 2011.
	Class 08	D3516 (08401)	1958	2025	Arrived on the West Somerset Railway in 2025 in blue livery and carrying its later TOPS number of 08401. It is only fitted with air brakes but will be restored with both vacuum and air brakes.
	Class 09	D4107	1961	2013	A larger diesel shunter, this one was built by British Railways at Horwich Works in 1961. At first numbered D4107 and sent to Carlisle, in October 1968 it was transferred to the Southern Region, initially at Hither Green TMD where it would have worked alongside its predecessor here (Class 08 D3462). It was renumbered to 09019 in 1973. When British Rail was split up in readiness for privatisation it was allocated to the Mainline Freight business and repainted in their blue colours, which it still carried when it arrived at Bishops Lydeard in 2013 but it now wears British Rail green livery.
	0-4-0DH	578	1972	?	This pair of Andrew Barclay shunters with hydraulic transmissions were built in 1972 for the Royal Ordnance Factory at Puriton in Somerset. Surplus to requirements since 1991, they are on long-term loan to the WSR and are based at Dunster for shunting the permanent way depot. They are both painted green but neither currently carries visible numbers. They can be distinguished as number 578's Barclay works plates have blue backgrounds, while number 579's are red.
	0-4-0DH	579	1972	?	This pair of Andrew Barclay shunters with hydraulic transmissions were built in 1972 for the Royal Ordnance Factory at Puriton in Somerset. Surplus to requirements since 1991, they are on long-term loan to the WSR and are based at Dunster for shunting the permanent way depot. They are both painted green but neither currently carries visible numbers. They can be distinguished as number 578's Barclay works plates have blue backgrounds, while number 579's are red.
	48DS	200793	1940	?	A Ruston and Hornsby 48DS four-wheel shunter built in 1940 for William Evan's Old Mill Colliery at Radstock, Somerset. Named Gower Princess.

== Diesel multiple units ==
Image	Class	Type	Number	Built	Comments
	117	DMBS	51354	1959	Arrived on the WSR in 2019, painted in British Railways green livery.
	115	DMBS	51859	1960	In service in British Railways green livery.
	115	DMBS	51880	1960	In service in British Railways green livery.
	115	DMBS	51887	1960	Undergoing extensive restoration at Minehead.
	108	DTC	56495	1960	Arrived from the Kirklees Light Railway in 2024.
	115	TC	59678	1960	In service in British Railways green livery, it has been modified with a small buffet counter.

== Coaching stock ==
Most trains are formed from British Rail Mark 1 coaches. Most used to be painted in a chocolate and cream livery based on the most familiar one used by the GWR but with WSR crests before 2016. However, from 2016, carmine and cream (or 'blood and custard') colours has been introduced for air braked stock, and newly painted chocolate and cream coaches appeared with British Railways emblems. Some coaches have been repainted in British Railways maroon since 2019.

The 'Quantock Belle' dining train was re-painted in early 2020 from a Pullman-based livery to BR Maroon. Each coach was formerly named in Pullman car style prior to 2020:, however upon the repaint all names were dropped.

Work is underway to restore a set of Great Western Railway coaches for use on the railway. Among those that are restored, or likely to be in the next few years are:

Image	Number	Company	Type	Built	Comments
	169	GWR	Autocoach	1929	Undergoing restoration at Williton.
	1464	SR	PMV	1951	Four-wheel van for passenger trains.
	1804	BR	RMB	1957	
	1909	BR	RUB	1957	
	2573	GWR	TK	1914	A GWR 'Toplight' coach used as a camp coach for railway volunteers at Blue Anchor but intended for restoration to service.
	2578	GWR	TK	1914	Awaiting restoration.
	2823	GWR	Fruit C	1937	Four-wheel van for passenger trains.
	2910	GWR	Fruit D	1941	Four-wheel van for passenger trains.
	2980	GWR	Siphon G	1945	Bogie milk van for passenger trains.
	3066	BR	FO	1955	
	3108	BR	FO	1962	Part of the 'Quantock Belle' dining train.
	3631	GWR	TK	1915	A GWR 'Toplight' coach intended for restoration to service.
	3639	GWR	TK	1921	A GWR 'Toplight' coach intended for restoration to service.
	3665	GWR	TK	1921	A GWR 'Toplight' coach intended for restoration to service.
	3885	GWR	TK	1920	A GWR 'Toplight' coach used as a camp coach for railway volunteers at Blue Anchor.
	3980	GWR	TK	1919	A GWR 'Toplight' coach used as a camp coach for railway volunteers at Blue Anchor.
	4260	BR	TSO	1956	
	4346	BR	TSO	1956	
	4419	BR	TSO	1956	
	4435	BR	TSO	1956	
	4449	BR	TSO	1956	
	4546	GWR	TK	1925	Awaiting restoration.
	4599	BR	TSO	1956	
	4660	BR	TSO	1957	
	4814	BR	RMB	1959	Built as a Second Open (SO) but converted to a Miniature Buffet (RMB).
	4875	BR	TSO	1959	
	4876	BR	TSO	1959	
	4884	BR	TSO	1959	
	4909	BR	TSO	1960	
	4911	BR	TSO	1960	
	4956	BR	TSO	1961	
	4987	BR	RBR	1962	A Tourist Second Open that was modified by the West Somerset railway to a buffet car in 2000.
	5002	BR	TSO	1961	
	5024	BR	TSO	1962	
	5025	BR	TSO	1962	
	5030	BR	TSO	1962	
	5131	GWR	BTK	1928	Awaiting restoration.
	5856	GWR	TK	1928	Awaiting restoration.
	6705	GWR	BCK	1938	Designed by Charles Collett. Undergoing restoration at Williton.
	7538	GWR	BCK	1907	A 'toplight' coach awaiting restoration.
	7740	GWR	CK	1911	Awaiting restoration.
	9038	GWR	SLF	1896	A clerestory sleeping coach which is usually on display in the museum at Bishops Lydeard.
	9227	BR	BSO	1956	
	9278	BR	BSO	1956	
	9380	BR	BSO	1963	A Brake Second Open that British Rail modified in 1980 to carry a 'micro buffet' trolley.
	10542	BR	SLEP	1982	A former Caledonian Sleeper coach that came to the West Somerset Railway in 2021.
	21268	BR	BCK	1964	
	21174	BR	BSK	1958	Brake Corridor Composite converted to Brake Corridor Second for the 'Quantock Belle' dining train.
	24985	BR	SK	1956	
	25308	BR	SK	1957	
	25323	BR	SK	1957	
	35257	BR	BSK	1958	
	35408	BR	BSK	1963	A corridor second modified as a generator car for the 'Quantock Belle' dining train.
	80736	BR	BG	1955	Modified to carry wheelchairs.
	80932	BR	BG	1957	Modified by British Rail with roller shutter doors.
	81380	BR	BG	1958	Modified by British Rail with roller shutter doors.
	94502	BR	CCT	1960	Four-wheel van for passenger trains.
	94917	BR	CCT	1961	Four-wheel van for passenger trains.

== Goods wagons ==
Heritage goods wagons on the West Somerset Railway include many examples from the Great Western Railway (GWR) and British Rail (BR) along with some from other companies. 'Operational' wagons are used in engineering trains, other 'heritage' wagons are suitable for use in a demonstration heritage freight train that is used on special occasions but 'museum' wagons are only allowed to run short distances.

Passenger-rated vans such as 'Fruit D' are listed in the Coaching stock section.

Image	Number	Company	Type	Built	Notes
	PW1	PBA	Crane	1953	Diesel-electric crane. Has also carried number 15404, previously operated by the Port of Bristol Authority.
	46	GWR	Open	1931	Great Western Railway diagram O29 wagon number 118904. It is carrying the livery of Foster Yeoman.
	102	GWR	6-wheel tank	1946	Water tank wagon.
	264	GWR	Crane	1908	Manual crane
	RW477	LT	Bogie flat	Unknown	
	RW483	LT	Flat	1950	
	1326	PO	Tank	1918	Built for the Caledonian Railway but rebuilt in 1942, it was later sold to Esso, becoming their number 1326.
	1822	PO	Tank	1939	Built by the LMSR as their 165363 but later sold to Esso, becoming their number 1822.
	3146	MoD	Bogie Well	1942	Built as a 'Warwell' for the War Department, later fitted with a hydraulic crane 96500 for bridge inspections.
	8080	MoD	Bogie flat	1940	War Department tank carrier.
	16307	GWR	Van	1910	'Mink A' van.
	32742	GWR	Bogie bolster	1938	'Macaw B'.
	32782	GWR	Single bolster	1900	
	32822	GWR	Bogie bolster	1938	'Macaw B'.
	41945	GWR	Bogie well	1909	'Cocodile K'
	46242	MoD	Open	1955	Original number unknown.
	46253	MoD	Open	1955	Original number unknown.
	47983	MoD	Van	Unknown	Built to a Southern Railway design
	49017	MoD	Brake van	1942	Built to a Southern Railway design.
	59378	SECR	Open	c.1926	59378 is the number given by the Port of Bristol Authority.
	63015	Unknown	Open	Unknown	Six-plank wagon of unknown origin. Carries Port of Bristol number.
	63058	Unknown	Open	Unknown	Five-plank wagon of unknown origin. Carries Port of Bristol number.
	68765	GWR	Brake van	1938	Great Western Railway diagram AA20 'Toad'.
	80669	GWR	Ballast	1942	Diagram P15 open ballast wagon.
	84003	MoD	Flat	1918	'Rectank'
	84006	MoD	Flat	1918	'Rectank'
	84685	GWR	Bogie bolster	1917	'Macaw B'.
	97286	GWR	Open	1912	Five-plank wagon. Carries Port of Bristol number 60286.
	100678	GWR	Well	1939	Chaired sleeper wagon to GWR diagram T12.
	105493	GWR	Gunpowder	1924	
	114751	GWR	Brake van	1934	Great Western Railway diagram AA20 'Toad'.
	126779	GWR	Van	1934	'Mink A' van, original number unknown.
	135744	GWR	Open	1937	GWR diagram O32 five-plank wagon.
	137696	GWR	Open	1938	Five-plank wagon.
	139760	GWR	Van	1939	'Mink A' van to GWR diagram V23.
	404103	LMS	Open	1936	LMSR diagram D1892 five-plank wagon.
	602206	BR	Bogie Flat	1967	Freightliner container flat wagon, BR diagram 1/086. Support wagon for locomotive 6024 King Edward I.
	732525	LMS	Brake	1949	LMSR diagram D2068.
	752355	BR	Van	1949	Built to a Southern Railway design, the first vehicle to arrive on the line after closure in 1971.
	784676	BR	Van	1964	Ventilated van to BR diagram 1/217.
	787158	BR	Van	1963	Ferry Van built to BR diagram 1/227.
	900118	BR	Flat	1959	'Flatrol EAC' to BR diagram 2/530. Was UIC registered for use in Europe, number 21-70-9904-012-3.
	904146	BR	Flat	1960	'Lowmac AB' to BR diagram 2/240.
	952527	BR	Brake	1954	BR diagram 1/506, TOPS code CAP.
	978032	BR	Bogie Open	1982	'Turbot' ballast and sleeper wagon rebuilt from Bogie Bolster originally built in 1961, BR diagram 1/479, TOPS code YCV.
	978037	BR	Bogie Open	1982	'Turbot' ballast and sleeper wagon rebuilt from Bogie Bolster originally built in 1961, BR diagram 1/479, TOPS code YCV.
	978105	BR	Bogie Open	1982	'Turbot' ballast and sleeper wagon rebuilt from Bogie Bolster origiannly built in 1961, BR diagram 1/479, TOPS code YCV.
	978348	BR	Bogie Open	1983	'Turbot' ballast and sleeper wagon rebuilt from Bogie Bolster originally built in 1961, BR diagram 1/479, TOPS code YCV.
	978622	BR	Bogie Open	1983	'Turbot' ballast and sleeper wagon rebuilt from Bogie Bolster originally built in 1961, BR diagram 1/479, TOPS code YCV.
	983290	BR	Hopper	1957	'Catfish' ballast hopper, BR diagram 1/586.
	983652	BR	Hopper	1960	'Dogfish' ballast hopper, BR diagram 1/587.
	983909	BR	Hopper	1961	'Dogfish' ballast hopper, BR diagram 1/587.
	993529	BR	Hopper	1956	'Catfish' ballast hopper, BR diagram 1/587.
	993592	BR	Hopper	1960	'Dogfish' ballast hopper, BR diagram 1/587.
	Unknown	Unknown	Open	1912	A two-plank wagon built by Hurst Nelson.
	Unknown	LMS	Van	Unknown	Built for the LMS, number unknown but in the 5xxxx series. Later used at Devonport Dockyard where its height was reduced
	Unknown	LNER	Van	1938	Original number unknown but would have started 21....

== Past members of the WSR fleet ==
=== Steam ===
The first main line steam locomotive to operate on the line when it reopened in 1976 was 6400 Class 6412 which was purchased from the Dart Valley Railway and sold back to the South Devon Railway Trust in 2008. During its time on the West Somerset Railway it carried Flockton Flyer nameplates for a while after appearing in the television series of that name. Other steam locomotives that have been on the railway but now gone elsewhere include GWR 2251 Class 3205 which is now on the South Devon Railway, BR Standard Class 4 2-6-4T 80136, and LB&SCR 'Terrier' 32678 Knowle. This had been displayed at the Butlins holiday camp at Minehead from 1964 until 1975; restoration was started at Minehead but was completed by the Kent and East Sussex Railway.

Many of the trains operated in the early years of the West Somerset Railway were hauled by one of two identical Bagnall 0-6-0ST locomotives that had been designed for the Steel Company of Wales’ Margam Steelworks in 1951. They were Vulcan (works number 2994) and Victor (2996). Both have since left the railway. Other industrial locomotives that have also moved elsewhere were Hudswell Clarke 0-6-0T Jennifer (1731, built 1942), Hawthorn Leslie 0-6-0ST Isabel (3437 of 1919), fireless Bagnall 0-4-0F No. 1 (2473 of 1932), Peckett 0-4-0 Whitehead (1163 of 1908?), and former Port of Bristol Portbury (Avonside 1764 of 1917) and Henbury (Peckett 1940 of 1937) which are now on the Bristol Harbour Railway.

Image	Class	Wheels	Number & name	Built	On WSR	Notes
	GWR 5101	2-6-2T	4110	1936	2015-2019	4110 was based at Taunton shed twice in the 1960s and was withdrawn from service in 1965. It was purchased by the Great Western Railway Preservation Group at the Southall Railway Centre in 1979. The West Somerset Railway purchased 4110 in 2015 but it left on 12 February 2019 in unrestored condition after being sold to the Dartmouth Steam Railway.
	GWR 5101	2-6-2T	4160	1948	1990-2016	4160 was delivered to the engine shed at Barry and worked from various sheds around south Wales until it was withdrawn in 1965. It then returned to Barry, but this time to Woodham Brothers’ scrap yard. It returned to service in 1993. The boiler certificate expired in January 2016 and it went to the Llangollen Railway for an overhaul. Although it was due to return to the WSR, it was instead moved to the South Devon Railway where the overhaul was completed and has been based there since.
	GWR 5600	0-6-2T	6695		2015-2019	6695 arrived as a visitor for a steam gala but was damaged during the movement by road to the WSR. It remained on the WSR for an overhaul. It had been intended that it would remain on loan for 25 years after the overhaul but this did not happen. 6695 departed from the WSR for the Swindon and Cricklade Railway in Dec 2019.
	GWR 6959	4-6-0	6960 Raveningham Hall		2011-2019	6960 was saved from Barry in 1972 and moved to Steamtown Carnforth. Restored in 1975, it was based at the Severn Valley Railway until 1996. After completion of an overhaul in 2009 it moved to the WSR. Owing to a weight restriction imposed on the WSR, it was decided to loan it to the Severn Valley Railway in 2019 in exchange for the lighter 7802 Bradley Manor. It was moved to the One:One Collection in Margate for static display ffter its boiler certificate expired in July 2021.
	GWR 4073	4-6-0	7027 Thornbury Castle		2018-2020	It was intended to restore 7027 at the WSR for use on both the heritage railway and trains on the main line. After a period in store at Williton it was sold in January 2020 and is now intended to work on the Great Central Railway when restoration is complete.
	GWR 6000	4-6-0	6024 King Edward I	1930	2012-2023	The 'Kings' were introduced in 1927 and were the Great Western Railway's largest express passenger locomotives. King Edward I, which was built in 1930, is one of the heritage steam locomotives that is equipped to Network Rail's standards for working trains on the main line and is regular seen at the head of excursions and trains such as the Torbay Express. 6024 has spent several periods based on the railway between working main line services. It returned to the railway on 17 March 2012 and worked a number of trains in the following weeks and was then moved into Minehead workshops for its ten-yearly overhaul. The overhaul was completed and it returned to the mainline in 2026.
	LMS 4F	0-6-0	44422	1927	2016-2019	4422 was built at Derby Works in 1927 and was allocated to Bristol in 1940 and Bath Green Park in 1948, when it was renumbered 44422. It spent the rest of its working life in the South West of England, often running over the former Somerset and Dorset Joint Railway. It was withdrawn from Gloucester shed in 1965 and sold to the Woodham Brothers for scrap. It was purchased in 1977 and taken to the Churnet Valley Railway where it was restored to working order in 1990. It arrived on the WSR on a 25-year loan agreement in February 2016 but this was terminated by the WSR in January 2019 and the locomotive returned to the Churnet Valley Railway in December 2019.
	S&DJR 7F	2-8-0	53808 (S&DJR 88)	1925	1977-2020	The S&DJR had a number of these large locomotives based at Bath Green Park for working heavy freight trains over the Mendip Hills, but they also took their turn on summer Saturday passenger trains. 88 was built by Robert Stephenson and Hawthorns in 1925, became London Midland and Scottish Railway 9678 (later changed to 13808) and then British Railways number 53808. It then received a second hand boiler from Midland Railway 4P 4-4-0 41092. It was sold to Woodham Brothers’ Barry scrap yard in 1964 but was rescued in 1970, restoration being completed on the WSR in 1987 It left in 2020 for the Mid Hants Railway.

=== Diesel ===
Shunting locomotives that have been based on the railway but now moved elsewhere are Ruston and Hornsby 0-4-0 183062 which used to shunt the milk depot at Chard Junction, and former Stanton and Staveley Iron Works 57, a Rolls-Royce Sentinel 0-6-0.

Image	Class	Number & name	Built	On WSR	Notes
	Class 50	50149 Defiance (D449)	1968	1994 - 1999	Built as D449, this locomotive was renumbered 50049 in 1974 but between August 1987 and February 1989 it was number 50149 while it had regeared bogies for freight traffic. It was named Defiance in May 1978. It arrived on the West Somerset Railway on 5 May 1994 but is now based on the Severn Valley Railway.
	Class 42	D832 Onslaught	1961	2008 - 2016	'Warship' class D832 was built by British Railways at Swindon and named to commemorate the warship HMS Onslaught. It was delivered to Laira TMD in 1961 where it was based for its entire career except for periods at Newton Abbot in 1961-67, and again in 1971-72. Withdrawn from service at the end of 1972, it moved to Derby the following year and was used by the Railway Technical Centre for several years. It is preserved on the East Lancashire Railway but was on extended loan to the Diesel and Electric Preservation Group from 2008 until 2016.
	Class 04	D2205	1953	1994 - 2012	After withdrawal by British Rail in 1969, this shunting locomotive was sold for inductrial use but was preserved, initially preserved on the Kent and East Sussex Railway in 1983. It arrived at the West Somerset Railway on 2 November 1994. It went to the Somerset & Dorset Museum at Radstock in 1994 but returned to the WSR in 1996. It moved to Peak Rail on 12 November 2012.
	Class 04	D2271	1958	1982 - 2018	This shunting locomotive was initially preserved at the Midland Railway - Butterley in 1972. It arrived at Minehead on 15 May 1982 but moved to the South Devon Railway on 1 November 2018.
	Class 08	D3462	1957	1996 - 2013	This shunting locomotive was preserved on the Dean Forest Railway in 1986 but was based at Bishops Lydeard from 23 April 1996 until 26 March 2013 when it moved to the Mid-Hants railway.
	Class 08	08850 (D4018)	1961	1993 - 1998	After initially being preserved on the West Somerset Railway from 13 September 1993, this shunting locomotive went to the North Yorkshire Moors Railway on 11 March 1998.
	Class 25	D7523	1965	1996 - 2011	D7523 was based on the West Somerset Railway from 30 April 1996 until it moved to the Epping Ongar Railway in September 2011.
	Class 14	D9551	1968	1981 - 2003	One of three Class 14s that have been based on the West Somerset Railway at various times, D9551 arrived in June 1981 after having been in industrial service at Corby Steelworks. It moved to the Royal Deeside Railway but moved to the Severn Valley Railway in 2013.
	Rolls-Royce Sentinel	DH16	1964	2001 - 2015	A Manchester Ship Canal locomotive, Sentinel works number 10175. Moved to the East Somerset Railway.

=== DMUs ===
In the early years a number of two-car sets were operated. Each was formed of a motor brake second (DMBS) and driving trailer composite (DTC), although sometimes they were formed into four-car trains. The first two sets were British Rail Class 103 built by Park Royal Vehicles (DMBSs 50413 and 50414, DTCs 56168 and 56169). 50413 and W56169 are now at the Helston Railway

These were later joined by two pairs of Gloucester-built Class 100s (50341 and 51118, 56097 and 56099) and a Cravens Class 105 pair (51482, 56121).

Two Class 115 DMBSs have also been on the railway in addition to the ones currently in service. The body of 51663 was stripped off and the chassis stored at Dunster for future use. 51852 was purchased by the WSRA as a spare driving car in 1994 but sold to the Dean Forest Railway for spares in 2011.
