= Dunster railway station =

Heritage railway station in Somerset, England

Dunster
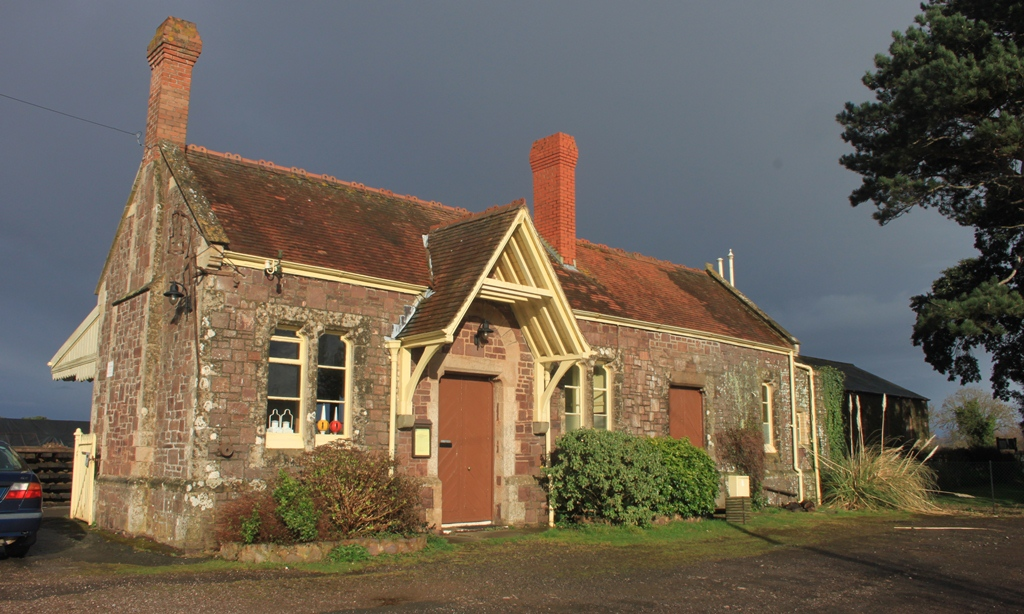

General information
- Location: Dunster, Somerset; England
- Coordinates: 51.1929°N 3.4381°W
- Grid reference: SS996447
- System: Station on heritage railway
- Operator: West Somerset Railway
- Platforms: 1

History
- Original company: Minehead Railway
- Pre-grouping: Great Western Railway
- Post-grouping: Great Western Railway

Key dates
- 1874: Opened
- 1971: Closed
- 1976: Opened in preservation
Location

Dunster railway station is near Dunster, Somerset, England and is on the West Somerset Railway, a heritage railway.

== History ==
The station was opened on 16 July 1874 by the Minehead Railway. The line was operated by the Bristol and Exeter Railway which was also amalgamated into the Great Western Railway (GWR) in 1876. The Minehead Railway was itself absorbed into the GWR in 1897. A small signal box stood at the Watchet end of the platform, but was demolished in 1926 when this was extended. In 1934 a new signal box at the opposite end of the station, brought second-hand from Maerdy, was put into use when the line from Dunster to Minehead was doubled in 1934.

The GWR was nationalised into British Railways in 1948 and from 1964, when goods traffic was withdrawn on 6 July, the line was run down until it was eventually closed on 4 January 1971. The line was reopened as a heritage railway operated by the West Somerset Railway on 28 March 1976. The signal box was moved to Minehead in 1977 but the goods yard is now home to the railway's civil engineering team.

== Description ==
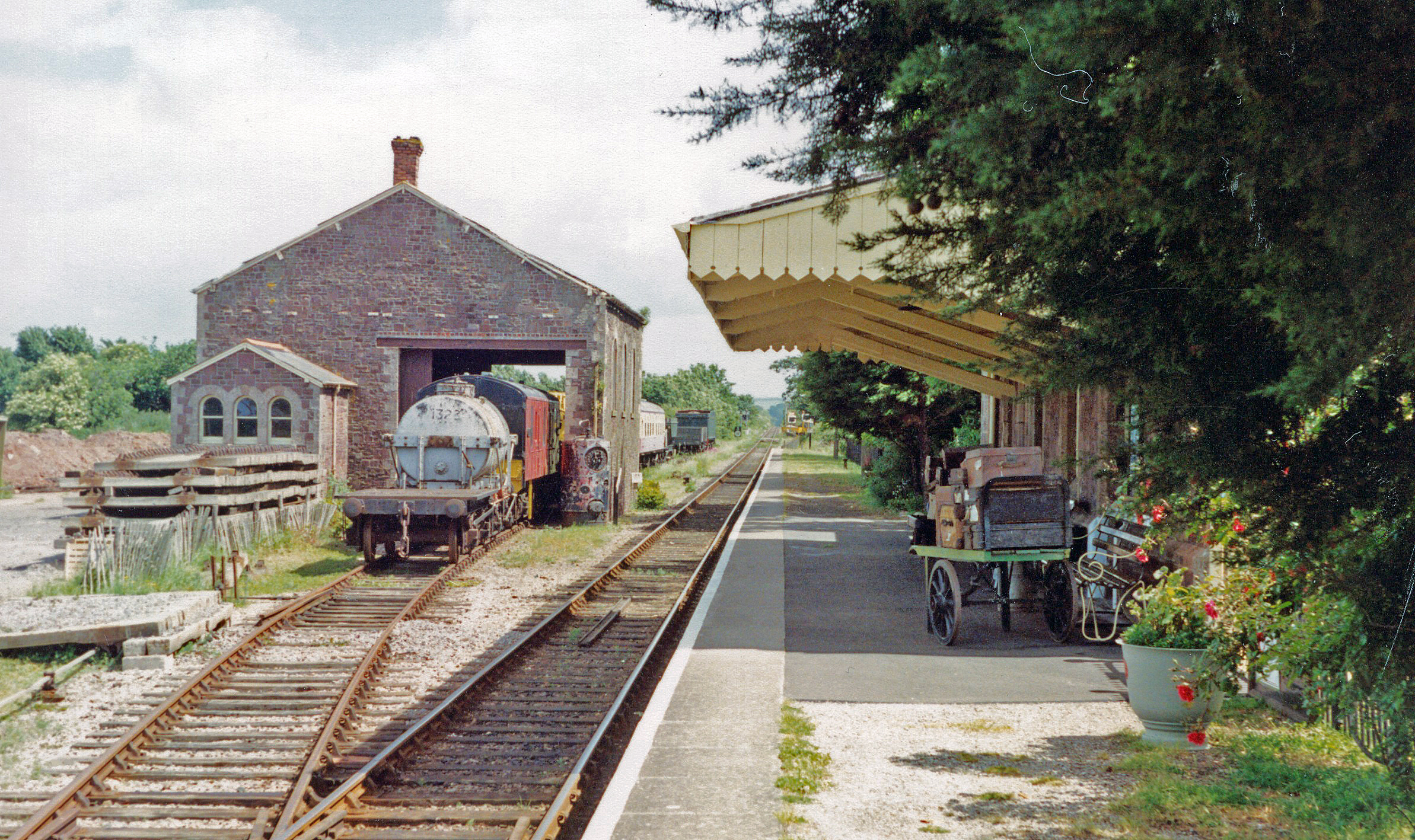
Looking towards Blue Anchor in 1991

The station is located one mile from the village of Dunster, which contains many historic buildings. The stone station building and platform is on the south side-west of the line, its imposing design reflects its former status as the station for distinguished visitors to Dunster Castle. It is a Grade II listed building. A goods shed was provided on the opposite side of the line, and this building and surrounding yard are now used as a workshop and base for the WSR's Permanent Way (civil engineering) department.

The Railway Printing Company is based in the old parcels office within the main building. From here they supply tickets printed on their old Edmondson railway ticket press to the WSR and many other heritage lines.

== Services ==
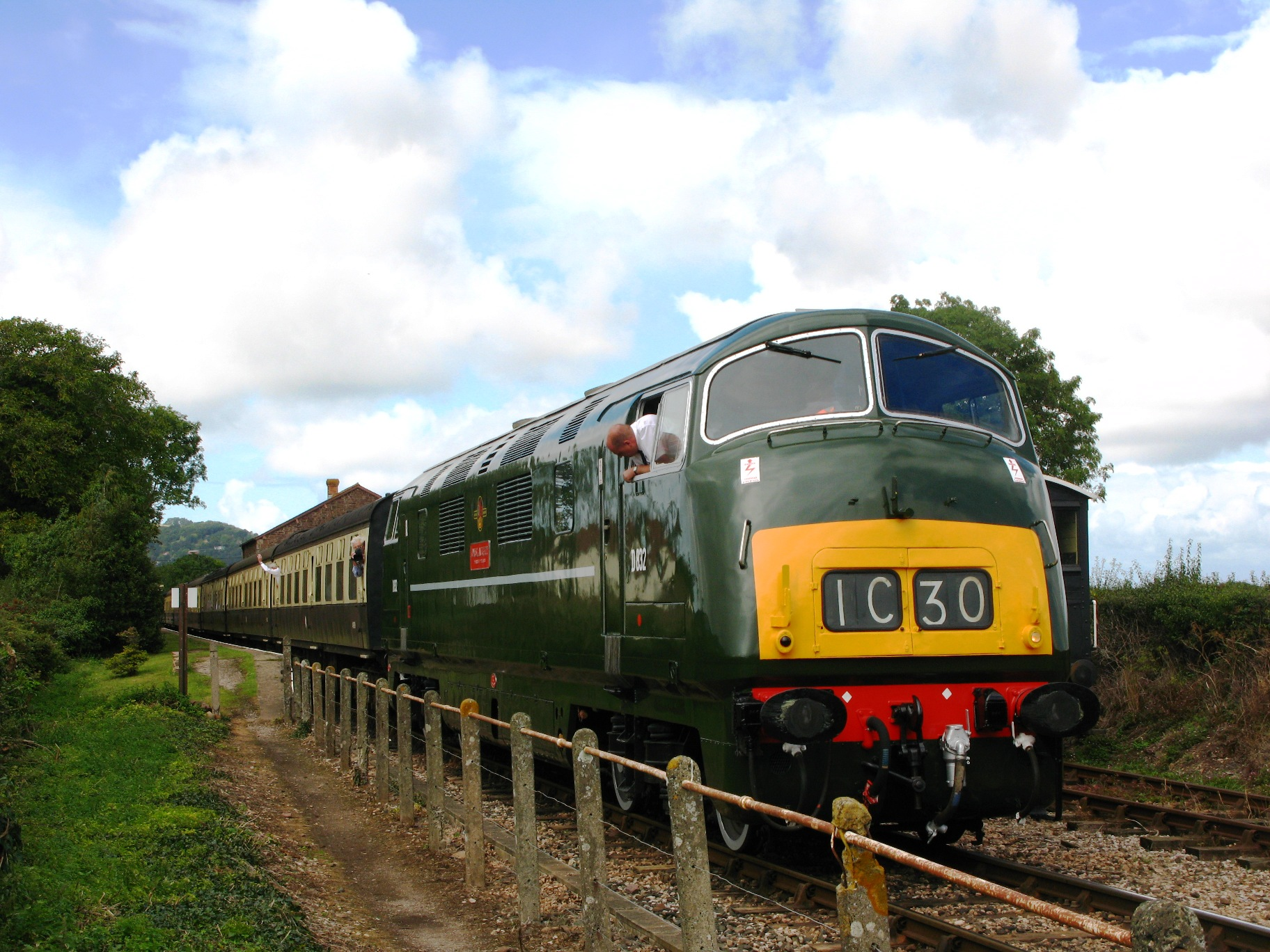
A diesel-hauled service to Bishops Lydeard at Dunster

Trains run between Minehead and Bishops Lydeard at weekends and on some other days from March to October, daily during the late spring and summer, and on certain days during the winter.

Preceding station	Heritage railways	Following station
Minehead Terminus	West Somerset Railway	Blue Anchor towards Bishops Lydeard
