= Blue Anchor railway station =

Heritage railway station in Somerset, England

Blue Anchor
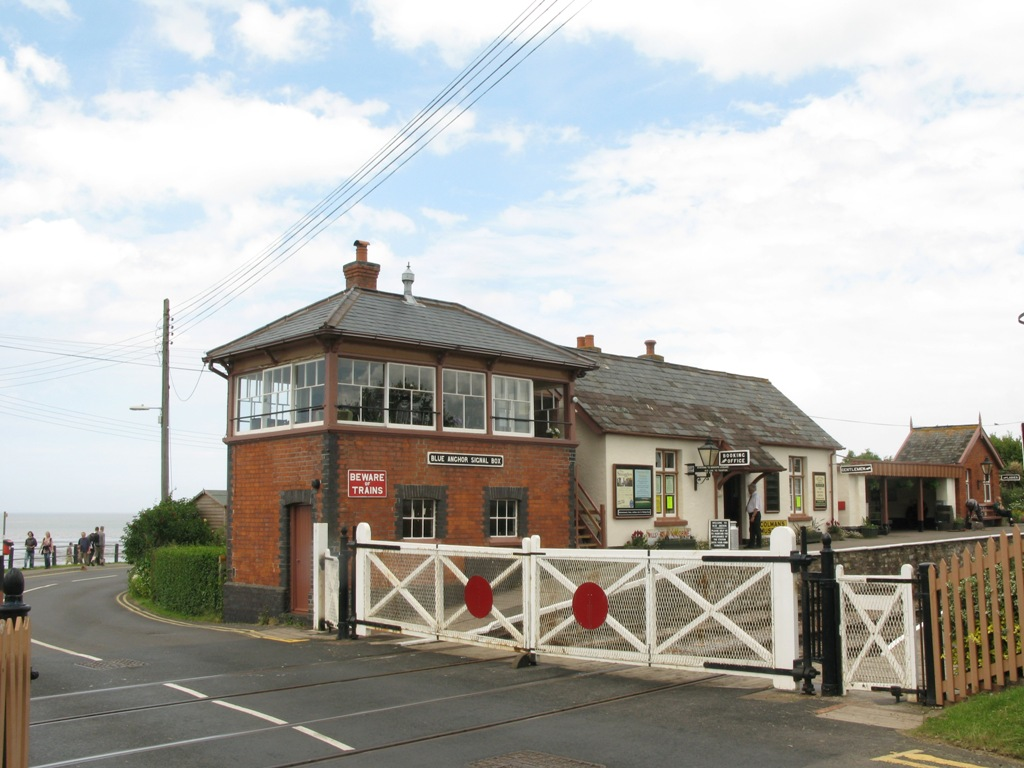

General information
- Location: Blue Anchor, Somerset; England
- Coordinates: 51.18152°N 3.40239°W
- Grid reference: ST021434
- System: Station on heritage railway
- Operator: West Somerset Railway
- Platforms: 2

History
- Original company: Bristol and Exeter Railway

Key dates
- 16 July 1874: Opened
- 4 January 1971: Closed
- 28 March 1976: Opened in preservation
Location

Blue Anchor railway station is situated in the seaside village of Blue Anchor, Somerset, England, close to the larger village of Carhampton. It is on the West Somerset Railway, a heritage railway, and it houses one of the two museums of the West Somerset Railway Heritage Trust.

== History ==
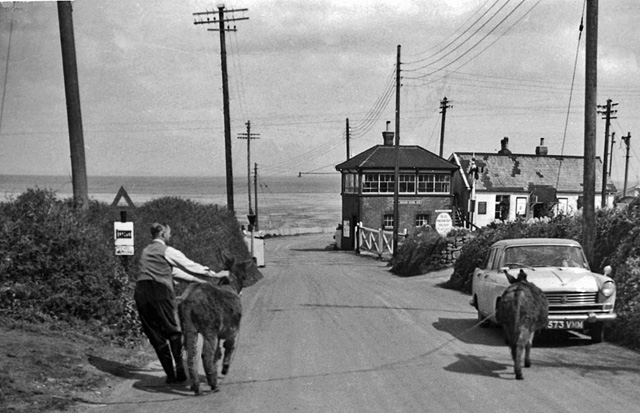
The station approach in 1963

The station was first opened on 16 July 1874 by the Minehead Railway as Blue Anchor. Suggestions that it was called 'Blue Anchor Excursion Platform' or 'Bradley Gate' have been shown to be incorrect. In 1874 it had only one platform, which faced the beach, but in 1904 the second track and platform were built by the Great Western Railway, which had taken over the railway in 1897. At the same time the signal box was opened to control new gates on the level crossing which carries the Carhampton road across the line at the west end of the station. A goods yard was opened west of the level crossing in 1913.

In 1934, as part of general upgrading of the Minehead branch, the platforms and passing loop were extended. A GWR camp coach was stabled here from 1934 to 1939. A camping coach was also positioned here by the Western Region from 1952 to 1956, two coaches from 1957 to 1961 and three coaches from 1962 to 1964.

Goods traffic was withdrawn in 1963 and passenger services ceased from 4 January 1971. The line from Minehead was reopened by the West Somerset Railway on 28 March 1976, and on to Williton on 28 August in the same year. Camp coaches once again grace the goods yard, where they provide overnight accommodation for volunteers working on the railway.

== Museum ==
The station buildings have been restored and the waiting room on the westbound platform was converted to a railway museum, opening in 1986 under the auspices of the West Somerset Railway Steam Trust. Staffing is provided by the Friends of Blue Anchor Railway Museum, who also undertake fundraising activities. The museum now contains around 550 items, mainly related to the Great Western Railway or other West Country lines.

== Description ==
The station is situated on a passing loop on the single track line and has two platforms. The one on the north side of the line and nearest the beach dates from 1874; this is where the signal box and ticket office can be found. The second platform has the museum situated in its waiting room.

== Services ==
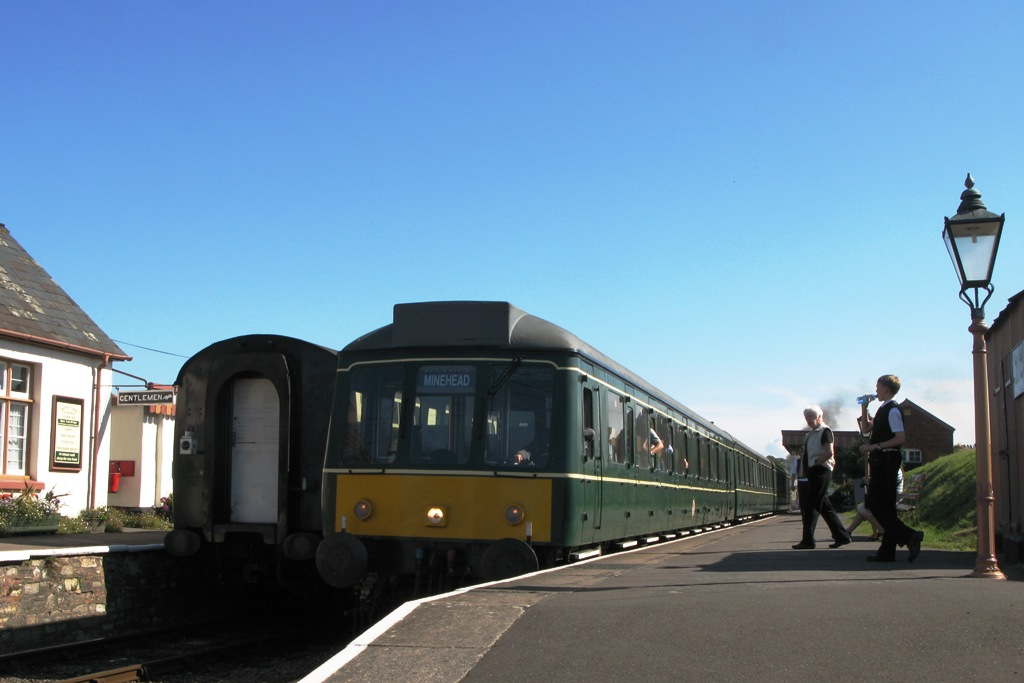
A DMU service to Minehead

Trains run between Minehead and Bishops Lydeard at weekends and on some other days from March to October, daily during the late spring and summer, and on certain days during the winter.

Preceding station	Heritage railways	Following station
Dunster towards Minehead	West Somerset Railway	Washford towards Bishops Lydeard
