= GWR 7800 Class 7822 Foxcote Manor =

Preserved British 4-6-0 locomotive

7822 Foxcote Manor
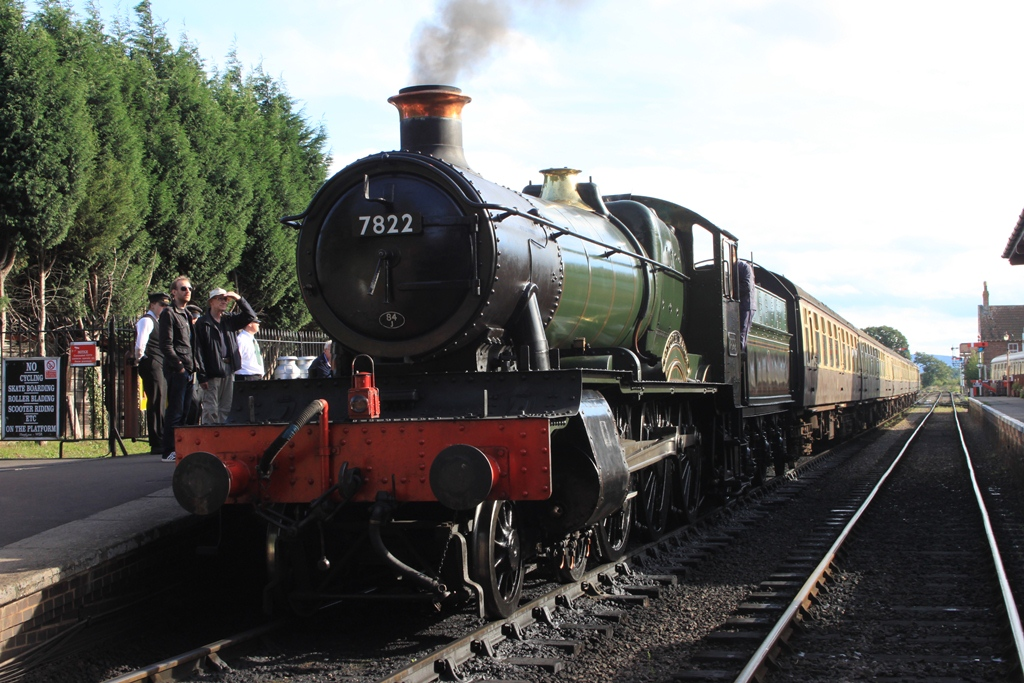
- GWR Manor Class no. 7822 Foxcote Manor at Bishops Lydeard railway station
Type and origin
- Power type: Steam
- Build date: December 1950
Specifications
- Configuration
  - Whyte: 4-6-0
  - UIC: 2'Ch2
- Gauge: 4 ft 8 1/2 in (1,435 mm) standard gauge
- Leading dia.: 3 ft 0 in (914 mm)
- Driver dia.: 5 ft 8 in (1,727 mm)
- Minimum curve: 6 chains (396 ft; 121 m) normal, 5 chains (330 ft; 101 m) slow
- Wheelbase: Loco: 27 ft 1 in (8.26 m); Loco & tender: 52 ft 1 3/4 in (15.89 m)
- Length: 61 ft 9 1/4 in (18.83 m)
- Width: 8 ft 11 in (2.718 m)
- Height: 13 ft 0 in (3.962 m)
- Axle load: 17 long tons 5 cwt (38,600 lb or 17.5 t) (19.3 short tons)
- Loco weight: 68 long tons 18 cwt (154,300 lb or 70 t) (77.2 short tons) full
- Tender weight: 40 long tons 0 cwt (89,600 lb or 40.6 t) (44.8 short tons) full
- Fuel type: Coal
- Fuel capacity: 7 long tons 0 cwt (15,700 lb or 7.1 t) (7.8 short tons)
- Water cap.: 3,500 imp gal (16,000 L; 4,200 US gal)
- Firebox
  - Grate area: 22.1 sq ft (2.05 m^{2})
- Boiler: GWR Standard No. 14
- Boiler pressure: 225 psi (1.55 MPa)
- Heating surface
  - Firebox: 140.0 sq ft (13.01 m^{2})
  - Tubes and flues: 1,285.5 sq ft (119.43 m^{2})
- Superheater
  - Heating area: 160.0 sq ft (14.86 m^{2})
- Cylinders: Two, outside
- Cylinder size: 18 in × 30 in (457 mm × 762 mm)
Performance figures
- Tractive effort: 27,340 lbf (121.61 kN)
Career
- Class: 7800 'Manor' Class
- Numbers: 7822
- Retired: December 1965
- Current owner: Foxcote Manor Society
- Disposition: Preserved

The Great Western Railway steam locomotive no. 7822 Foxcote Manor is a 4-6-0 Manor Class locomotive, built in 1950 at Swindon Works. It is part of a post-war batch of 10 locomotives, which follows on from 20 earlier locomotives built in 1938.

== Working life ==
Designed with a lighter axle loading than the red-rating of the other GWR mixed-traffic Hall and Grange 4-6-0 classes, the Manor class were ideally suited to the lightweight cross country and coastal routes of the former Cambrian Railways.

Based over its entire working life on the former Cambrian Railways, its first shed allocation was to Oswestry depot and its last to Shrewsbury, with working allocations also to Chester and Machynlleth. It was used to haul both passenger and freight services over former CR lines including the Cambrian Line and the now-closed Ruabon Barmouth Line. It regularly hauled the "Cambrian Coast Express" from Shrewsbury to Aberystwyth, and in 1965 the British Royal Train.

== Preservation ==
Withdrawn in 1965 from Shrewsbury, it was towed to Woodham Brothers scrapyard in Barry, South Wales. It languished there until 1975, when it was initially moved to Oswestry, the headquarters of the Cambrian Railways Society where much of the fundraising and restoration took place. In 1985 it was moved to the Llangollen Railway, a restored part of the Ruabon Barmouth Line, where it returned to steam in December 1987. It then worked until its second withdrawal in 1997, when after a heavy overhaul it returned to service in 1999.

Since its return to work in preservation, the locomotive has since been on loan to: Gloucestershire Warwickshire Railway, Great Central Railway (Nottingham), Keighley and Worth Valley Railway, North Yorkshire Moors Railway, South Devon Railway and the West Somerset Railway. Following a third 10-year overhaul in preservation, 7822 returned to service in early 2016, and throughout 2017 was on hire, firstly to the Kent & East Sussex Railway, and then to the WSR in 2018.

== Allocations ==
First shed December 1950	March 1959	May 1965	Last Shed
Oswestry	Oswestry	Shrewsbury	Shrewsbury
