= Washford railway station =

Heritage railway station in Somerset, England

Washford
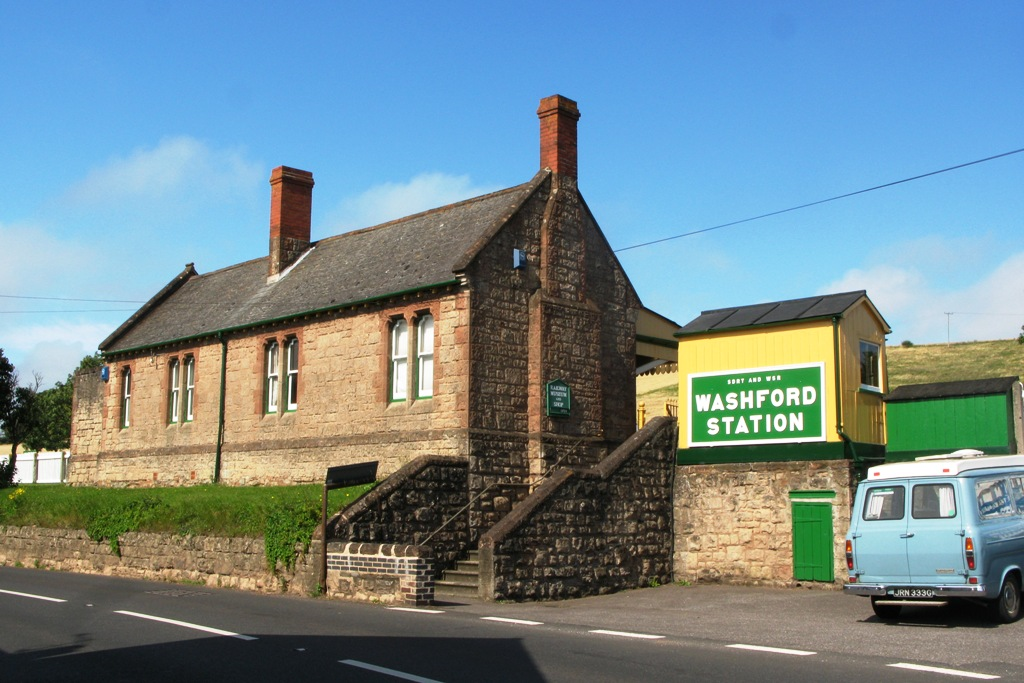

General information
- Location: Old Cleeve, Somerset; England
- Coordinates: 51.1618°N 3.3690°W
- Grid reference: ST043411
- System: Station on heritage railway
- Operator: West Somerset Railway
- Platforms: 1

History
- Original company: Minehead Railway
- Pre-grouping: Great Western Railway
- Post-grouping: Great Western Railway

Key dates
- 1874: Opened
- 1971: Closed
- 1976: Opened in preservation
Location

Washford railway station is a station on the West Somerset Railway, a heritage railway in England. The station is situated in the village of Washford, which is itself within the civil parish of Old Cleeve in the county of Somerset.

== History ==
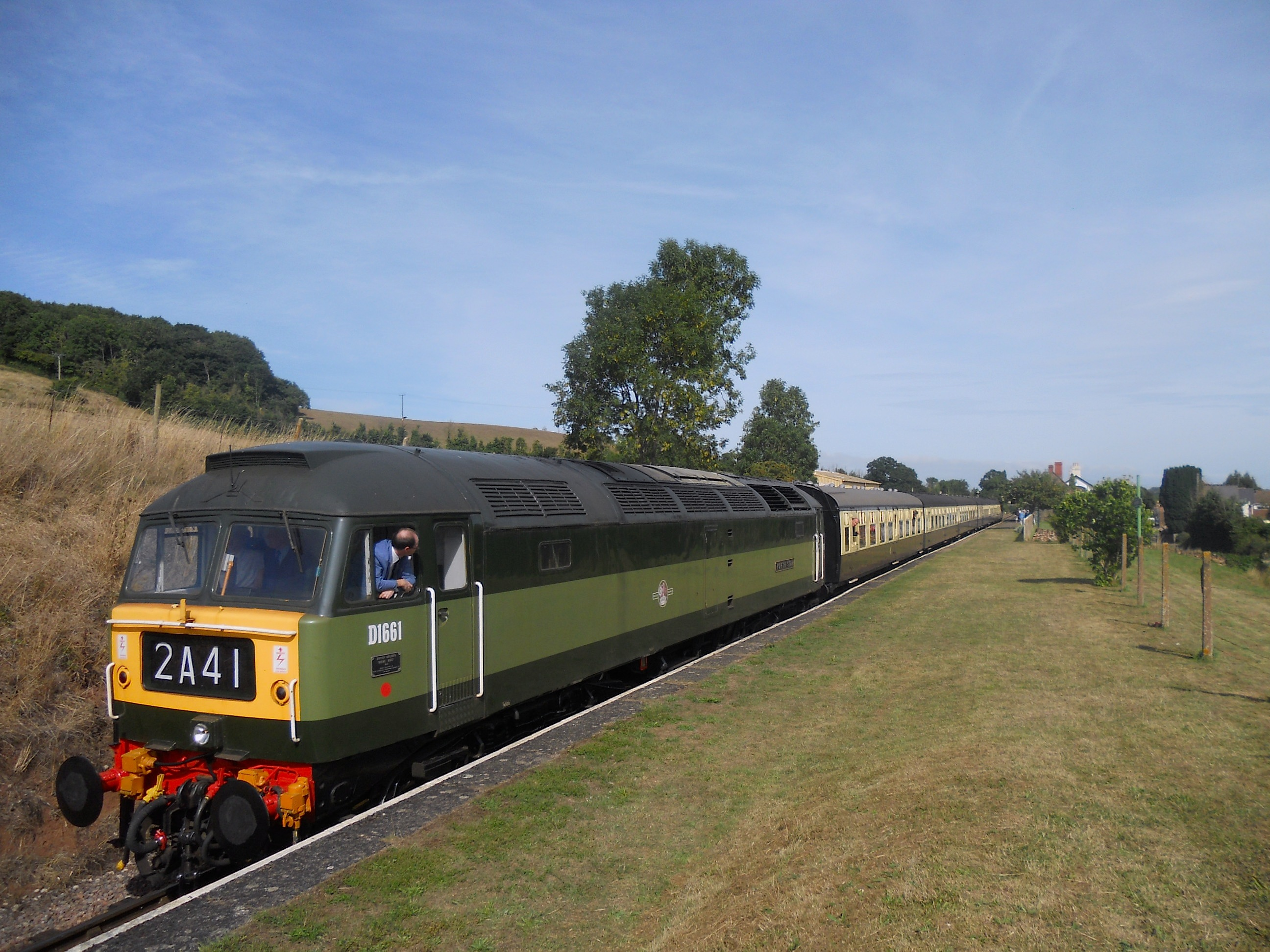
British Rail Class 47 D1661 'North Star' at Washford, 2013

The station was opened on 16 July 1874 by the Minehead Railway. The railway was operated by the Bristol and Exeter Railway which was amalgamated into the Great Western Railway in 1876. The Minehead Railway was itself absorbed into the GWR in 1897 which, in turn, was nationalised into British Railways in 1948.

The signal box was closed in 1952, goods traffic ceased in 1964, and the station became unstaffed in 1966. The line was eventually closed on 4 January 1971 but was reopened by the West Somerset Railway on 28 August 1976.

== Description ==
Washford is the second highest station on the line and is situated in a gap between the coastal cliffs and the Brendon Hills. It is accessed by two very steep inclines for steam trains – climbing up from Blue Anchor trains face a 1 mile (1.6 km) section at 1 in 65 (1.5%), the steepest on the line. The station has a single platform on the south side of the line, although there is an extensive yard on the opposite side of the line from the platform, where the Somerset and Dorset Railway Trust was based (see below) and is now a carriage works operated by the West Somerset Railway Heritage Trust.

== Somerset and Dorset Railway Trust Museum ==
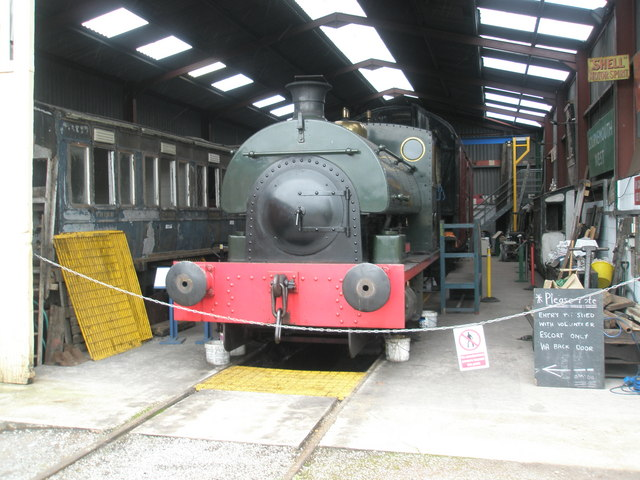
Kilmersdon in the S&DRT's workshop at Washford

The Somerset and Dorset Railway Trust had been based at Washford from 1976 to 2023. The Trust's collection at Washford contained relics of the Somerset and Dorset Joint Railway (S&DJR), including station nameboards, lamps, tools, signalling equipment, tickets, photographs, handbills, rolling stock and steam locomotives. The Trust's Peckett and Sons 0-4-0ST No. 1788 "Kilmersdon" was based there for many years when not on hire, before removed to the Mid-Hants Railway (Watercress Line).

Next to the original stone station building of 1874 is a much smaller wooden building, which originally was the Great Western Railway's signal box. This structure housed a recreation of the interior of the S&DJR signal box at Midford. A second signal box was used as part of a signalling display in the yard and was formerly used on the S&DJR at Burnham-on-Sea.

The stock and artefacts have now been moved to new locations – the main new location is Alresford, on the Mid-Hants Railway (Watercress Line), where a new secondary main lines museum has been established.

Following on from the vacating of the site by the Somerset and Dorset Railway Trust, in early 2024, the West Somerset Railway Heritage Trust have taken on a 10-year lease of the site, which will be used for restoration of heritage carriages.

== Services ==
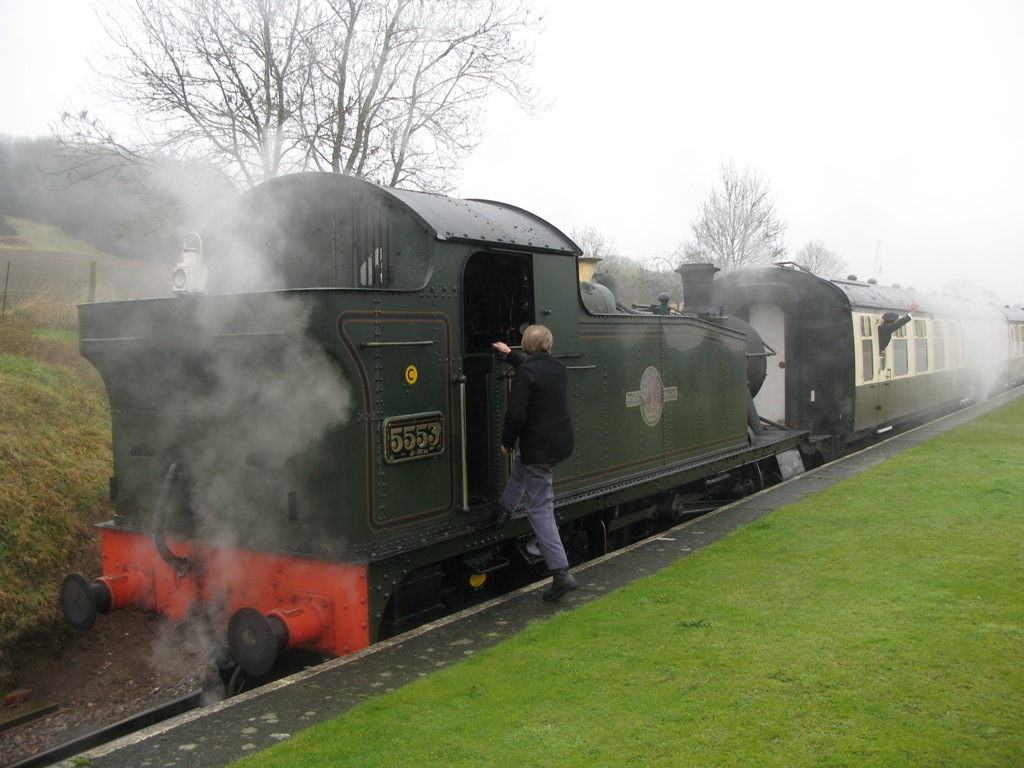
5553 about to restart its train to Minehead

Trains run between Minehead and Bishops Lydeard at weekends and on some other days from March to October, daily during the late spring and summer, and on certain days during the winter.

Preceding station	Heritage railways	Following station
Blue Anchor towards Minehead	West Somerset Railway	Watchet towards Bishops Lydeard
